= United States Post Office and Courthouse (Camden, New Jersey) =

- Federal Building and Courthouse
- U.S. National Register of Historic Places
- New Jersey Register of Historic Places
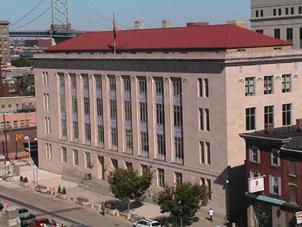

- Location within Camden County, New Jersey Location within New Jersey Location within the United States
- Location: 401 Market Street; Camden, New Jersey
- Coordinates: 39.946944°N 75.121389°W
- Built: 1932
- Architect: Office of the Supervising Architect under James A. Wetmore
- NRHP reference No.: 11000992
- NJRHP No.: 931

Significant dates
- Added to NRHP: January 4, 2012
- Designated NJRHP: November 9, 2011

The United States Post Office and Courthouse (1932) and the Mitchell H. Cohen United States Courthouse (1994) house the United States District Court for the District of New Jersey in Camden, New Jersey. The back-to-back buildings are joined by a second story enclosed skyway.

== United States Post Office and Courthouse ==
Located at 401 Market Street between Camden Central Business District and Cooper Grant, the United States Post Office and Courthouse opened in 1932. The neoclassical Art deco building was designed by the Office of the Supervising Architect under James A. Wetmore with an exterior primarily in limestone, granite, brick. Prominent interior features include decorative and colorful terracotta detailing; Spanish Colonial ornamentation and a ceremonial courtroom with oak wainscot paneling.

The building houses the United States Bankruptcy Court District of New Jersey. The building is listed in the state and federal registers of historic places.

== Mitchell H. Cohen United States Courthouse (annex) ==
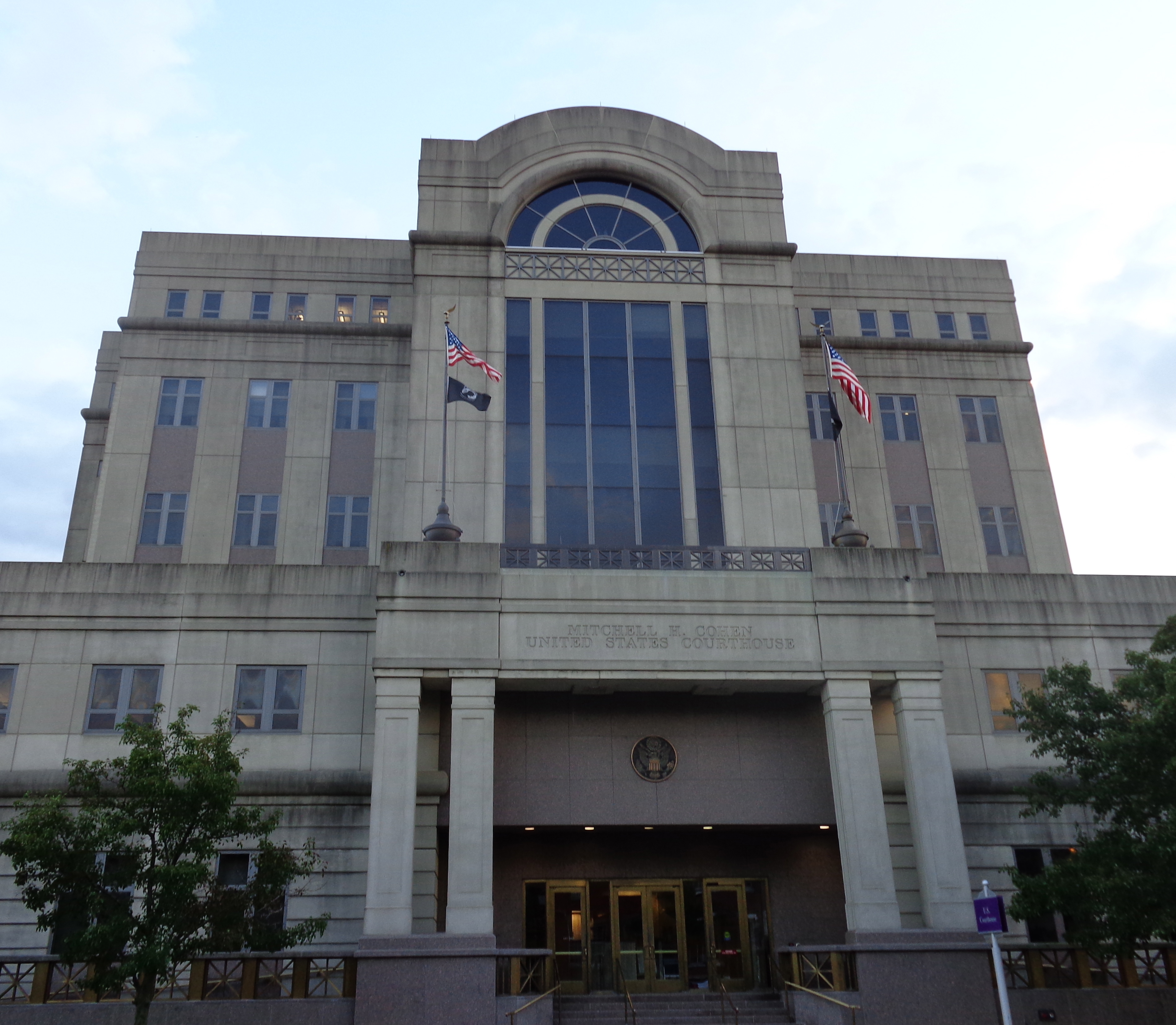
Mitchell H. Cohen United States Courthouse (1994)

The Mitchell H. Cohen United States Courthouse was designated in 1992 honor of federal Judge Mitchell H. Cohen. Completed in 1994 the courthouse's entrance is located on Cooper Street. The seven-story, 180,000-square-foot building includes 12 courtrooms and attendant facilities, Appellate Judge's suites, Grand Jury room, District Clerk's office, US Marshall's Service Administrative office, prisoner holding facility, law library, and secure indoor parking.

== Gallery ==
The sinopia drawings of Ben Shahn's Jersey Homesteads mural were removed from their original site in Roosevelt and in 1999 they were permanently installed in a custom-designed gallery in the skyway connecting the two buildings.

In 1999, an addition connecting two wings of the building was created on the second floor of the building. The arriccio, sinopia drawings of the fresco for Ben Shahn's Jersey Homesteads mural (1938) were removed from their original community center location in what has now become Roosevelt and is permanently installed in the custom-designed gallery within it.

== See also ==
- Camden County Hall of Justice
- List of United States federal courthouses in New Jersey
- National Register of Historic Places listings in Camden County, New Jersey
- List of tallest buildings in Camden
