= Mitchell H. Cohen United States Courthouse =

United States federal court house

Coordinates: 39.946944°N 75.121389°W

The Mitchell H. Cohen United States Courthouse (1994) and the United States Post Office and Courthouse (1932) house the United States District Court for the District of New Jersey in Camden, New Jersey. The back-to-back buildings are joined by a second-story enclosed skyway.

== Mitchell H. Cohen United States Courthouse ==
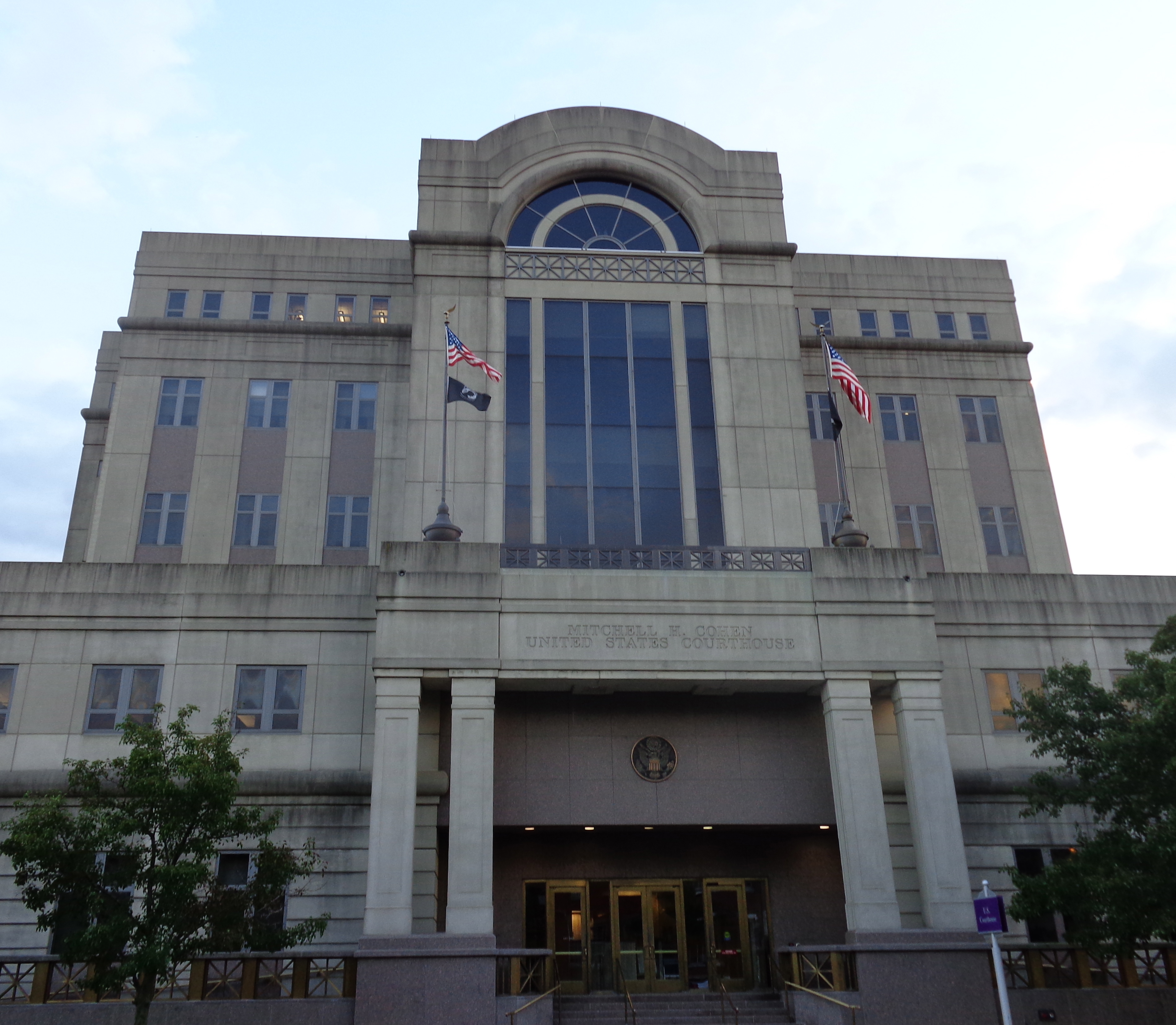
Mitchell H. Cohen United States Courthouse (1994)

The Mitchell H. Cohen United States Courthouse was designated in 1992 honor of federal Judge Mitchell Harry Cohen Completed in 1994 the courthouse's entrance is located on Cooper Street. The seven-story, 180,000-square-foot building includes 12 courtrooms and attendant facilities, Appellate Judge's suites, Grand Jury room, District Clerk's office, US Marshall's Service Administrative office, prisoner holding facility, law library, and secure indoor parking.

== United States Post Office and Courthouse ==
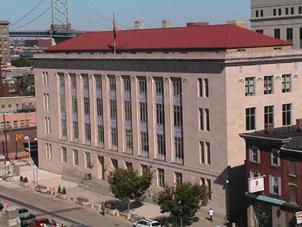
United States Post Office and Courthouse (1932)

Located at 401 Market Street between Camden Central Business District and Cooper Grant the United States Post Office and Courthouse opened in 1932. The neoclassical Art deco building was designed by the Office of the Supervising Architect under James A. Wetmore with an exterior primarily in limestone, granite, brick. Prominent interior features include decorative and colorful terracotta detailing; Spanish Colonial ornamentation and a ceremonial courtroom with oak wainscot paneling. In addition to the US post office the building houses the United States Bankruptcy Court District of New Jersey.

== Gallery ==
In 1999, an addition connecting the two wings of the complex was created. The arriccio, sinopia drawings of the fresco for Ben Shahn's Jersey Homesteads Mural was removed from its original community center location in what has now become Roosevelt and is permanently installed in the custom-designed gallery within it.

== See also ==
- Camden County Hall of Justice
- List of United States federal courthouses in New Jersey
- List of tallest buildings in Camden
