= Ben Shahn =

American artist (1898–1969)

- Born: Benjamin Shahn; September 12, 1898; Kovno, Russian Empire
- Died: March 14, 1969 (aged 70); New York City, US
- Education: City College of New York; National Academy of Design
- Known for: Painting, illustration, graphic art, photography, writing
- Notable work: Nicola Sacco & Bartolomeo series and Jersey Homesteads Mural
- Movement: Social realism
- Spouse(s): Tillie Goldstein (m. 1924; divorced); Bernarda Bryson (m. 1935)
- Children: 5

Ben Shahn (September 12, 1898 – March 14, 1969) was an American artist. He is best known for his works of social realism, his left-wing political views, and his series of lectures published as The Shape of Content.

Born Benjamin Shahn in what was then the Russian Empire, in 1898, he immigrated with his Jewish family to the United States in 1906 following his father's exile to Siberia for suspected revolutionary activity. Settling in Brooklyn, Shahn initially trained as a lithographer. After briefly studying biology at New York University, he turned fully to art, attending the National Academy of Design and traveling through Europe with his first wife. Though influenced by European modernists, Shahn ultimately rejected their stylistic approaches in favor of a realist mode aligned with his social concerns, a direction crystallized by his 1932 series The Passion of Sacco and Vanzetti, which responded critically to contemporary politics.

During the Great Depression, Shahn's work with the Public Works of Art Project, the Resettlement Administration, and the Farm Security Administration further solidified his role as a social-documentary artist. Collaborating with figures such as Diego Rivera and Walker Evans, he produced photographic and mural work addressing labor conditions and American life under the New Deal. His murals for the Jersey Homesteads school, the Bronx Post Office, and the Social Security Administration exemplify themes such as immigrant hardship, labor struggles, and collective reform, often grounding his compositions in visual references to Jewish tradition and American political history.

Later in his career, he contributed to wartime propaganda through the Office of War Information, although his anti-war stance emerged in later paintings like Death on the Beach and Liberation. He produced commercial illustrations for major magazines, created stained glass, and represented the United States at the 1954 Venice Biennale. Consistently rejecting abstraction in favor of legible, symbol-laden realism, Shahn's compositions often featured expressive distortions, asymmetry, and dynamic spatial arrangements. He received honorary doctorates from Princeton University and Harvard University, and joined Harvard as a Charles Eliot Norton professor in 1956.

== Early life and education ==
Shahn was born in Kovno in the Russian Empire (now Kaunas, Lithuania) to Jewish parents Joshua Hessel and Gittel (Lieberman) Shan. His father was exiled to Siberia for possible revolutionary activities in 1902, at which point Shahn, his mother, and two younger siblings moved to Vilkomir (today Ukmergė).

In 1906, the family immigrated to the United States where they rejoined Hessel, a carpenter, who had fled Siberia and immigrated to the US by way of South Africa. They settled in the Williamsburg section of Brooklyn, New York, where two more siblings were born. His younger brother drowned at age 17.

Although Shahn attended New York University as a biology student in 1919, he went on to pursue art at City College in 1921 and then at the National Academy of Design.

== Early career and travels ==
Shahn began his art career in New York, where he was first trained as a lithographer. Shahn's early experiences with lithography and graphic design are apparent in his later prints and paintings which often include the combination of text and image. Shahn's primary medium was egg tempera, popular among social realists.

After his marriage to Tillie Goldstein in 1924, the two traveled through North Africa and then to Europe, where he made "the traditional artist pilgrimage." There he studied great European artists such as Henri Matisse, Raoul Dufy, Georges Rouault, Pablo Picasso and Paul Klee. Contemporaries who would make a profound impact on Shahn's work and career include artists Walker Evans, Diego Rivera and Jean Charlot.

Shahn was dissatisfied with the work inspired by his travels, claiming that the pieces were unoriginal. He eventually outgrew his pursuit of European modern art, and redirected his efforts toward a realist style which he used to contribute to social dialogue.

== Work during the Great Depression ==
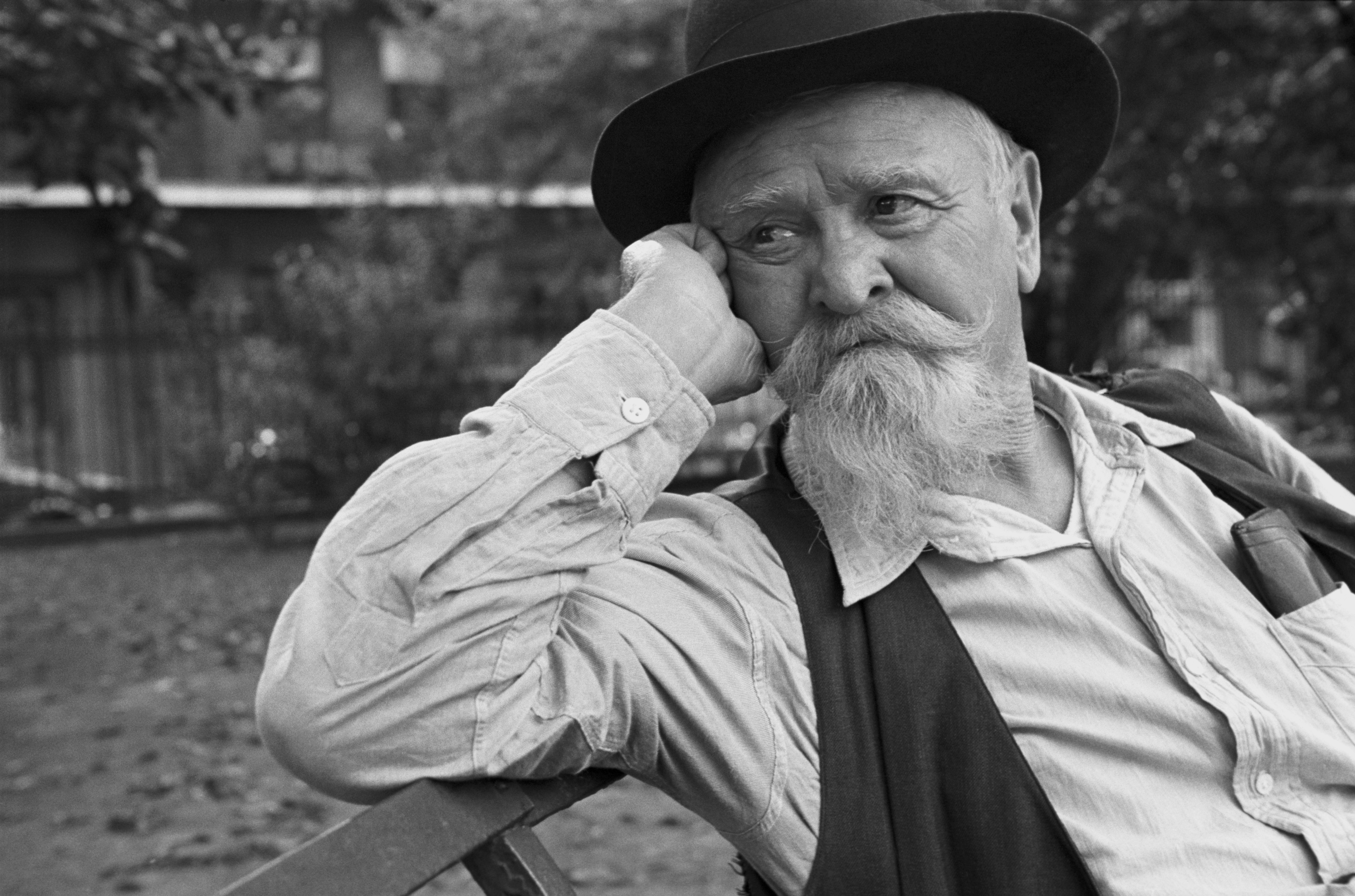
Photograph of a sailor taken by Shahn in Jackson Square, New Orleans, 1935

Shahn's series of 23 gouache paintings depicting the trials of Sacco and Vanzetti communicated the political concerns of his time, rejecting academic prescriptions for subject matter. The Passion of Sacco and Vanzetti was exhibited in 1932, and received acclaim from both the public and critics. This series gave Shahn the confidence to cultivate his personal style, regardless of society’s art standards.

Shahn's subsequent series depicting California labor leader Tom Mooney won him the recognition of Diego Rivera. In May and June 1933, he served as an assistant to Rivera while Rivera executed his notorious Rockefeller Center mural. Shahn had a role in fanning the controversy, by circulating a petition among the workers. Also during this period, Shahn met photojournalist Bernarda Bryson, who would later become his second wife. Although this marriage was successful, the mural, his 1934 project for the Public Works of Art Project, and his proposal for the Municipal Art Commission were all failures.

Fortunately, in 1935, Shahn was recommended by Walker Evans, a friend and former roommate, to Roy Stryker to join the photographic group at the Resettlement Administration (RA). As a member of the group, Shahn roamed and documented the American south together with his colleagues Walker Evans and Dorothea Lange. Like his earlier photography of New York City, Shahn's photography for the RA and its successor, the Farm Security Administration, can be viewed as social-documentary.

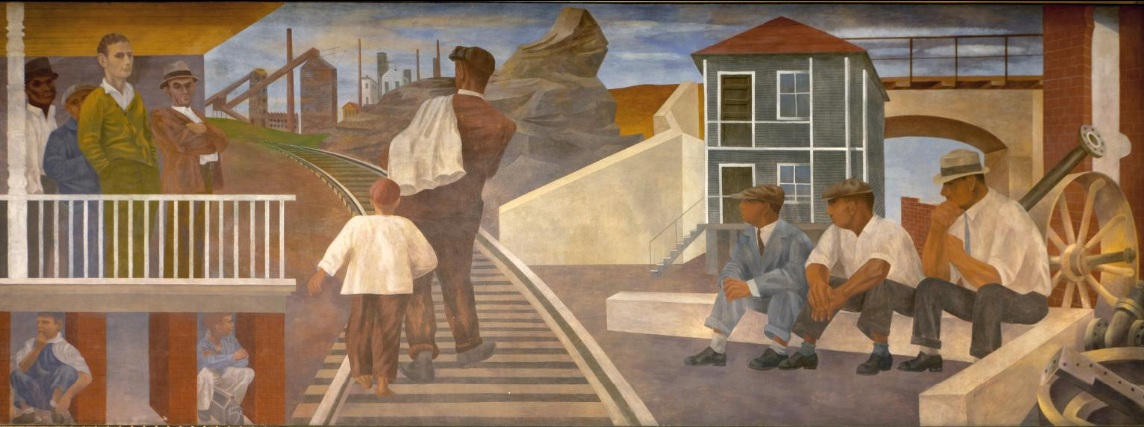
Panel from Ben Shahn, "The Meaning of Social Security" murals (1942)

Similarly, Shahn’s New Deal art for the RA and FSA exposed American living and working conditions. He also worked for these agencies as a graphic artist and painter. Shahn's fresco mural for the school of Jersey Homesteads is among his most famous works, but the government also hired Shahn to execute the Bronx Central Annex Post Office (1939) and Social Security (1942) murals. For the 10 panels of "The Meaning of Social Security" mural at the Social Security Administration Building, Shahn was assisted by John Ormai; it is presently cared for by the GSA Fine Art Collection. As of December, 2025, the former Social Security Administration Building and all the murals in it were under threat of demolition.

In 1939, Shahn and his wife produced a set of 13 murals inspired by Walt Whitman's poem I See America Working and installed at the Bronx Central Annex Post Office. Curator Susan Edwards recognizes the influence of this art on the public consciousness, writing, "The Roosevelt administration believed [such] images were useful for persuading not only voters but members of Congress to support federal relief and recovery programs … The art he made for the federal government affirms both his own legacy and that of the New Deal."

== World War II and beyond ==
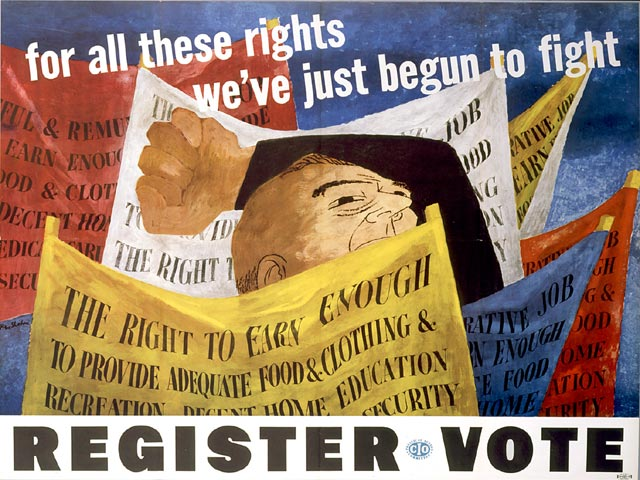
Congress of Industrial Organizations (CIO) poster (1946)

During the war years of 1942–43, Shahn worked for the Office of War Information (OWI), but his pieces lacked the preferred patriotism of the day and only two of his posters were published. His art's anti-war sentiment found other forms of expression in a series of paintings from 1944 to 1945, such as Death on the Beach, which depicts the desolation and loneliness of war. In 1945 he painted Liberation about the Liberation of Paris which depicts children playing in the rubble. He also did a series, called Lucky Dragon, about the Daigo Fukuryū Maru (literally, Lucky Dragon No. 5), the Japanese fishing boat caught in the Bikini Atoll hydrogen bomb blast. As of 2012, an important part of this series is in the collections of Fukushima Prefectural Museum of Art.

In 1947 he directed a summer session of the School of the Museum of Fine Arts at the Berkshire Museum in Pittsfield, Massachusetts. In the summer of 1951, Shahn served on the faculty of Black Mountain College.

Edward Steichen selected Shahn's work, including his October 1935 photograph The family of a Resettlement Administration client in the doorway of their home, Boone County, Arkansas, for MoMA's world-touring The Family of Man which was seen by 9 million visitors. Only the huddled figure of the woman on the right hand half of Shahn's 35mm frame was blown up for the display.

From 1961 to 1967, Shahn worked on the stained glass at Temple Beth Zion, a Buffalo, NY synagogue designed by Harrison & Abramovitz.

Shahn also began to act as a commercial artist for CBS, Time, Fortune and Harper's. His portrait of Martin Luther King Jr. appeared on the 19 March 1965 cover of Time. Despite Shahn's growing popularity, he only accepted commissions which he felt were of personal or social value. By the mid-1950s, Shahn's accomplishments had reached such a height that he was sent, along with Willem de Kooning, to represent the United States at the 1954 Venice Biennale. He was also elected to the American Academy of Arts and Sciences, the National Institute of Arts and Letters and the Academia dell' Arte e del Disegno in Florence. The Art Directors Club Hall of Fame recognizes him as "one of the greatest masters of the twentieth century. Honors, books, and gallery retrospectives continue to rekindle interest in his work...years after his death."

The artist was especially active as an academic in the last two decades of his life. He received honorary doctorates from Princeton University and Harvard University, and joined Harvard as a Charles Eliot Norton professor in 1956. His published writings, including The Biography of Painting (1956) and The Shape of Content (1957), became influential works in the art world.

After his death, William Schuman composed "In Praise of Shahn", a modern canticle for orchestra, first performed January 29, 1970, by the New York Philharmonic, Leonard Bernstein conducting.

== Themes ==
Ben Shahn’s social-realist vision informed his approach to art. Shahn’s examination of the status quo inspired his creative process. Although he often explored polemic themes of modern urban life, organized labor, immigration and injustice, he did so while maintaining a compassionate tone. Shahn identified himself as a communicative artist. He challenged the esoteric pretensions of art, which he believed disconnect artists and their work from the public. As an alternative, he proposed an intimate and mutually beneficial relationship between artist and audience.

Shahn defended his choice to employ pictorial realities, rather than abstract forms. According to Shahn, known forms allow the artist "to discover new truths about man and to reaffirm that his life is significant." References to allegory, the Torah, humanistic content, childhood, science, music and the commonplace are other motifs Shahn draws upon to make the universal personal for his viewers. Wit, candor and sentimentality give his images poignancy. By evoking dynamism, Shahn intended to inspire social change. Shahn stressed that in art, as in life, the combination of opposing orders is vital for progress. His hope for a unity among the diverse peoples of the United States relates to his interest in fusing different visual vocabularies.

== Style ==
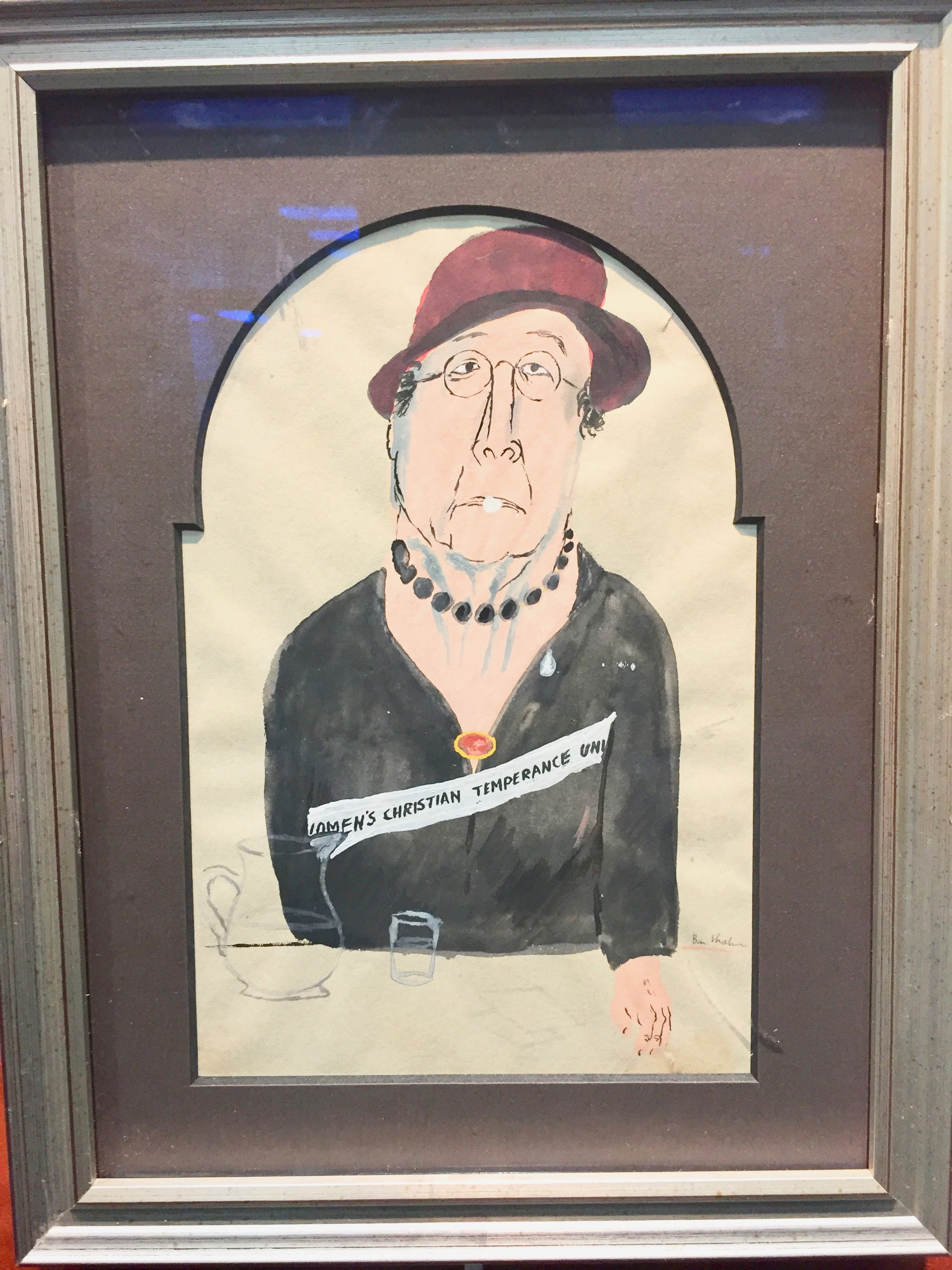
Women's Christian Temperance Union by Ben Shahn.

Shahn mixed different genres of art. His body of art is distinctive for its lack of traditional landscapes, still lifes, and portraits. Shahn used both expressive and precise visual languages, which he united through the consistency of his authoritative line. His background in lithography contributed to his devotion to detail. Shahn is also noted for his use of unique symbolism, which is often compared to the imagery in Paul Klee's drawings. While Shahn's "love for exactitude" is apparent in his graphics, so too is his creativity. In fact, many of his paintings are inventive adaptations of his photography.

Shahn's art is striking but also introspective. He often captured figures engrossed in their own worlds. Many of his photographs were taken spontaneously, without the subject's notice. To achieve these candid shots Shahn often used a right-angle viewfinder on his 35mm Leica; he can be seen using it in a window reflection in an untitled picture from his 1938 series made in Circleville, Ohio. Although he used many mediums, his pieces are consistently thoughtful and playful.

=== Handball ===
Evocative juxtapositions characterize Shahn's aesthetic. He intentionally paired contrasting scales, colors, and images together in order to create visual tension. One signature example is seen in his play between industrial coolness and warm human portrayals. Handball demonstrates his "use of architectural settings as both psychological foil to human figures and as expressive abstract pattern," and is also an example of his use of photographs as source material. His c.1933 untitled Gelatin silver print held in the Fogg Art Museum (Harvard University, Cambridge, Massachusetts, Gift of Mrs. Bernarda B. Shahn) of handball players was made around 1933 just after he took up photography and before his period as a FSA photographer. It has striking symmetry rarely achieved amongst the random events of the street.

To make the painting of the scene six years later, Shahn transcribed the positions of the handball players, including the photographic accident of a tensed arm and leg that appear to sprout from the bomber jacket of the man at left. But he spreads the men away from each other and expands the frame, breaking the symmetry, to include a brownstone building over the top of the wall, and to also encompass a billboard at left. Gestures and poses are exaggerated, and a hand is added to the figure at right, which was cropped in the photograph. The line markings on the wall are made to converge to further stretch the space. In a 1957 interview, Shahn described the painting as being about “social relationships”.

== Jersey Homesteads mural ==
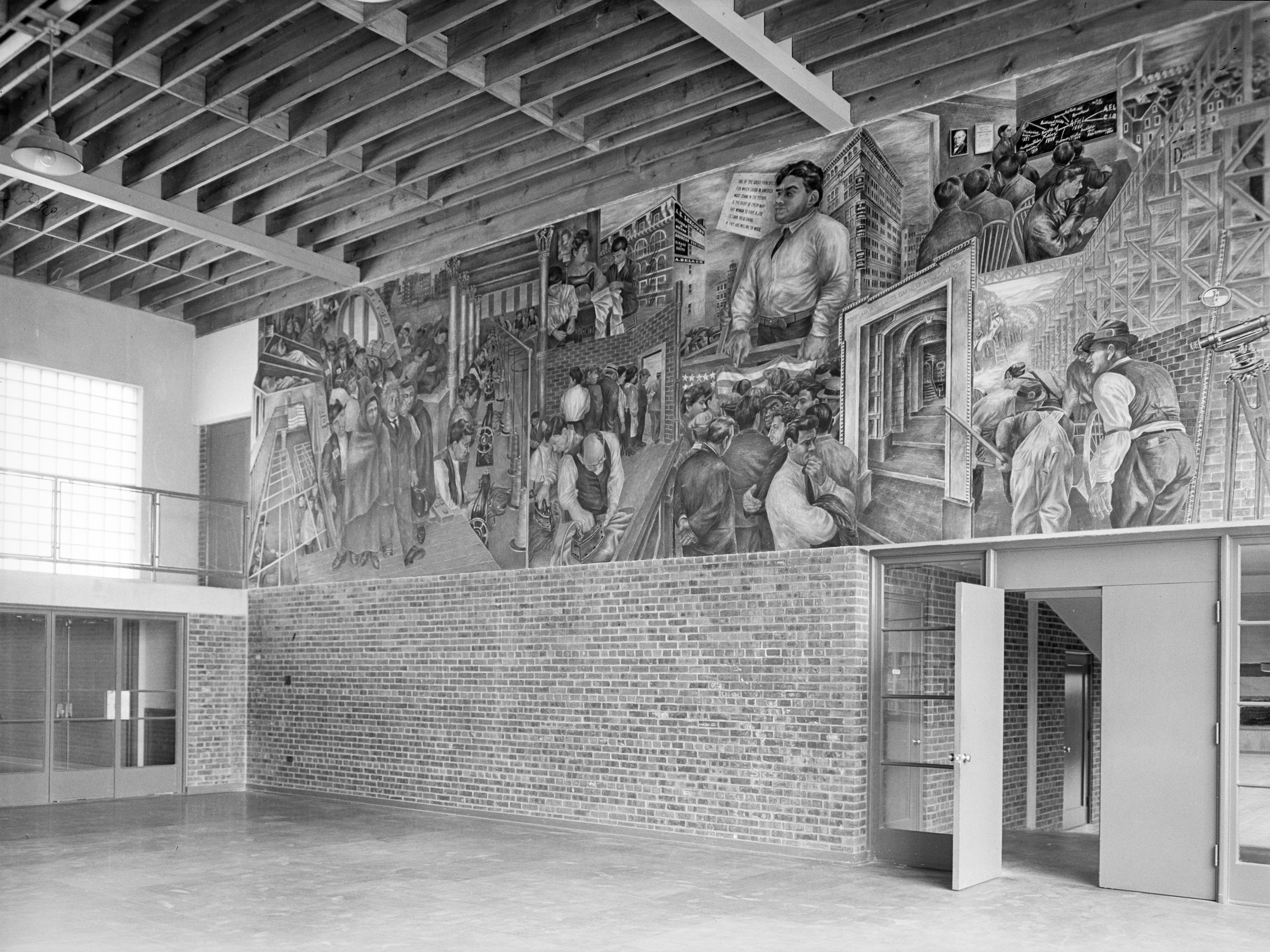
Shahn's untitled fresco for the Jersey Homesteads in May 1938, shortly after it was completed

Shahn with his sinopia drawings for the Jersey Homesteads mural (1938)

In 1999 the original sinopia drawings were permanently installed in a custom-designed gallery within the United States Post Office and Courthouse in Camden, New Jersey, in a skyway connecting the building with the Mitchell H. Cohen United States Courthouse.

The Resettlement Administration employed Shahn to paint a mural for the school of Jersey Homesteads (later renamed Roosevelt), a New Jersey town initially planned to be a community for Jewish garment workers. Shahn's move to the settlement demonstrates his dedication to the project as does his mural's compelling depiction of the town's founding.

Three panels compose the mural. According to art historian Diana L. Linden, it is his “most explicit Jewish work in terms of subject matter”. The panels' sequence relates to that of the Haggadah, the Jewish Passover Seder text which follows a narrative of slavery, deliverance and redemption. More specifically, Shahn’s mural depicts immigrants' struggle and advancement in the United States.

The first panel shows the antisemitic and xenophobic obstacles American immigrants faced. During the global Depression, citizens of the United States struggled for their livelihoods. Because foreigners represented competition for employment, they were especially unwelcome. National immigration quotas also reflected the strained foreign relations of the United States at a time when fascism, Nazism, and communism were on the rise. To illustrate the political and social adversary, Shahn incorporated loaded iconography: Nazi soldiers, anti-Jewish signs and the executed Italian anarchists, Sacco and Vanzetti. Below, Shahn's mother and Albert Einstein lead immigrants on a gangplank situated by the Ellis Island registry center and the Statue of Liberty. This section demonstrates the immigrants' heroic emergence in the United States.

The middle panel describes the poor living conditions awaiting immigrants after their arrival. On the right, Shahn depicts the inhuman labor situation in the form of "lightless sweatshops ... tedious and backbreaking work with outmoded tools." The crowd in the center of the composition represents labor unions and workers' reform efforts. Here, a figure resembling labor leader John L. Lewis protests in front of the Triangle Shirtwaist Company, where a devastating fire occurred and the movement for the International Ladies' Garment Workers Union (ILGWU) began. The lower right passageway marked ILGWU symbolizes a new and hopeful path, in the United States, paved by unionized labor.

In the last panel, the unions and the New Deal unite to create the blueprint for the town of the Jersey Homesteads. Various figures of social progress such as Sidney Hillman and Heywood Broun gather around the drafting table. Above them are images of the purposed cooperative farm and factory along with a campaign poster of Roosevelt, after whom the town was eventually named.

Shahn’s biographer Soby notes "the composition of the mural at Roosevelt follows the undulant principle Shahn had learned from Diego Rivera: deep recession of space alternating with human and architectural details projected forward." Moreover, the montage effectively intimates the amalgamation of peoples and cultures populating the urban landscape in the early 20th century. Multiple layers and perspectives fuse together to portray a complex industrialized system. Still, the mural maintains a sense of humanity; Shahn gives his figures a monumental quality through volume and scale. The urban architecture does not dwarf the people; instead, they work with the surroundings to build their own structure. Shahn captured the urgency for activism and reform, by showing gestures and mid-steps and freezing all the subjects in motion. This pictorial incorporation of "athletic pose and evocative asymmetry of architectural detail" is a Shahn trademark. While exemplifying his visual and social concerns, the mural characterizes the general issues of Shahn's milieu.

The arriccio, sinopia drawings of the fresco for Ben Shahn's Jersey Homesteads mural were removed from its original community center location in Roosevelt and is now permanently installed in a custom-designed gallery on the second floor of the United States Post Office and Courthouse at in Camden. The gallery adjoins the adjacent annex, the Mitchell H. Cohen Building and U.S. Courthouse.

== Selected artworks ==
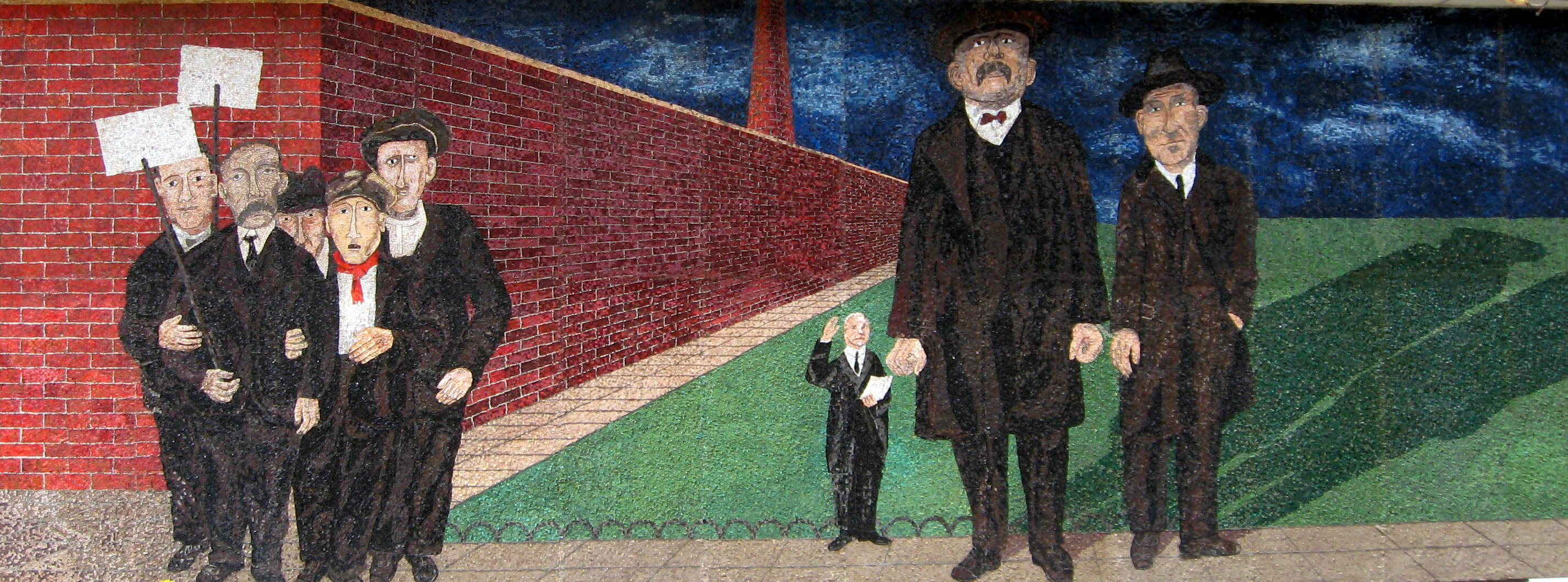
Detail from "The Passion of Sacco and Vanzetti" (1967, mosaic), Syracuse University, Syracuse, NY

- Bartolomeo Vanzetti and Nicola Sacco Their Guards, 1932, Collection of Miss Patricia Healey Yale University
- The Passion of Sacco and Vanzetti, 1931–33, Whitney Museum
- Three Witnesses, 1931–2, Montclair Art Museum
- Untitled (Houston Street Playground, New York City), 1932, Fogg Art Museum
- W.C.T.U Parade, 1933–34, Museum of the City of New York
- Jersey Homesteads Mural, 1937–38, Community Center of the Federal Housing Development, Roosevelt, New Jersey
- Still Music, 1938, Philips Collection, Washington DC and in Black/White
- Handball, 1939, The Museum of Modern Art, New York (Mrs. John D. Rockefeller, Jr., Fund)
- The Meaning of Social Security mural, 1940–42, Federal Security Building, Washington, DC
- For Full Employment after the War, Register-Vote, 1944, The Museum of Modern Art, New York
- Allegory, 1948, Bill Bomar Collection at The Modern
- Age of Anxiety, 1953, The Joseph H. Hirschhorn Foundation, Inc.
- Pleiades, 1960, (National Gallery of Art)

== Exhibitions ==
- "Ben Shahn: Paintings and Drawings," 1930, Edith Halpert's Downtown Gallery in New York, New York
- "57th Annual American Exhibition: Water Colors and Drawings," 1946, Tate Gallery in London, England
- "Ben Shahn: A Retrospective," 1947, Museum of Modern Art in New York, New York
- "Esposizione Biennale internationale D’Arte XXVII," 1954 in Venice, Italy
- "Ben Shahn," 1962, Palais des Beaux-Arts in Brussels, Belgium; Galleria Nazionale D'arte Moderna in Rome, Italy; and Albertina in Vienna, Austria.
- "The Collected Prints of Ben Shahn," 1969, Philadelphia Museum of Art in Pennsylvania.
- "Ben Shahn: A Retrospective Exhibition," 1969, New Jersey State Museum, Trenton, New Jersey.
- "Ben Shahn's New York: The Photography of Modern Times," 2000–01, Fogg Art Museum, Cambridge, Massachusetts.
- “Ben Shahn On Nonconformity” Museo Nacional Centro de Arte Reina Sofía, Madrid, October 4, 2023–February 26. 2024; "Ben Shahn, On Nonconformity" Jewish Museum, New York City, May 23–October 12, 2025.

== See also ==
- Kahler-Kreis
- List of AIGA medalists
