= Camden Waterfront =

Populated place in Camden County, New Jersey, US

Coordinates: 39.935593°N 75.126809°W

- Neighborhood
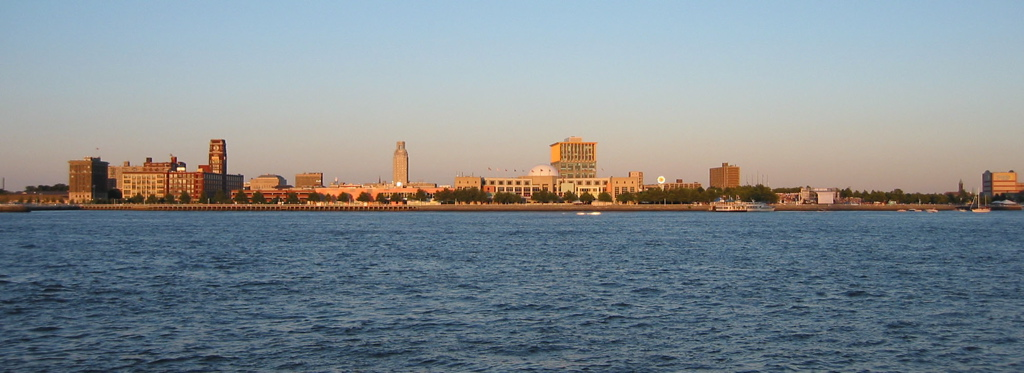
- Camden Waterfront in the background with the Delaware River in the foreground, 2005
- Interactive map of Camden Waterfront
- Country: United States
- State: New Jersey
- County: Camden
- City: Camden
- Area code: 856

The Camden Waterfront, also known as the Central Waterfront, is a commercial and entertainment district on the waterfront of Camden, New Jersey, on the Delaware River south of the Ben Franklin Bridge and north of Port of Camden.

The Waterfront South was founded in 1851 by the Kaighns Point Land Company. During World War II, Waterfront South housed many of the industrial workers for the New York Shipbuilding Company. Currently, the Waterfront is home to many historical buildings and cultural icons. The Waterfront South neighborhood is a federal and state historic district due to its history and culturally significant buildings, such as the Sacred Heart Church and the South Camden Trust Company. The Central Waterfront is located adjacent to the Benjamin Franklin Bridge and is home to the Nipper Building (also known as The Victor), the Adventure Aquarium, and Battleship New Jersey.

The district is characterized by its visitor attractions and its location offering views of the river and the Center City skyline. It is served by RiverLink Ferry which crosses the river to Philadelphia and the Cooper St-Rutgers, Aquarium, and Entertainment Center stations of the River Line light rail system. According to the 2000 U.S. census, the neighborhood has a population of 962.

== Attractions ==
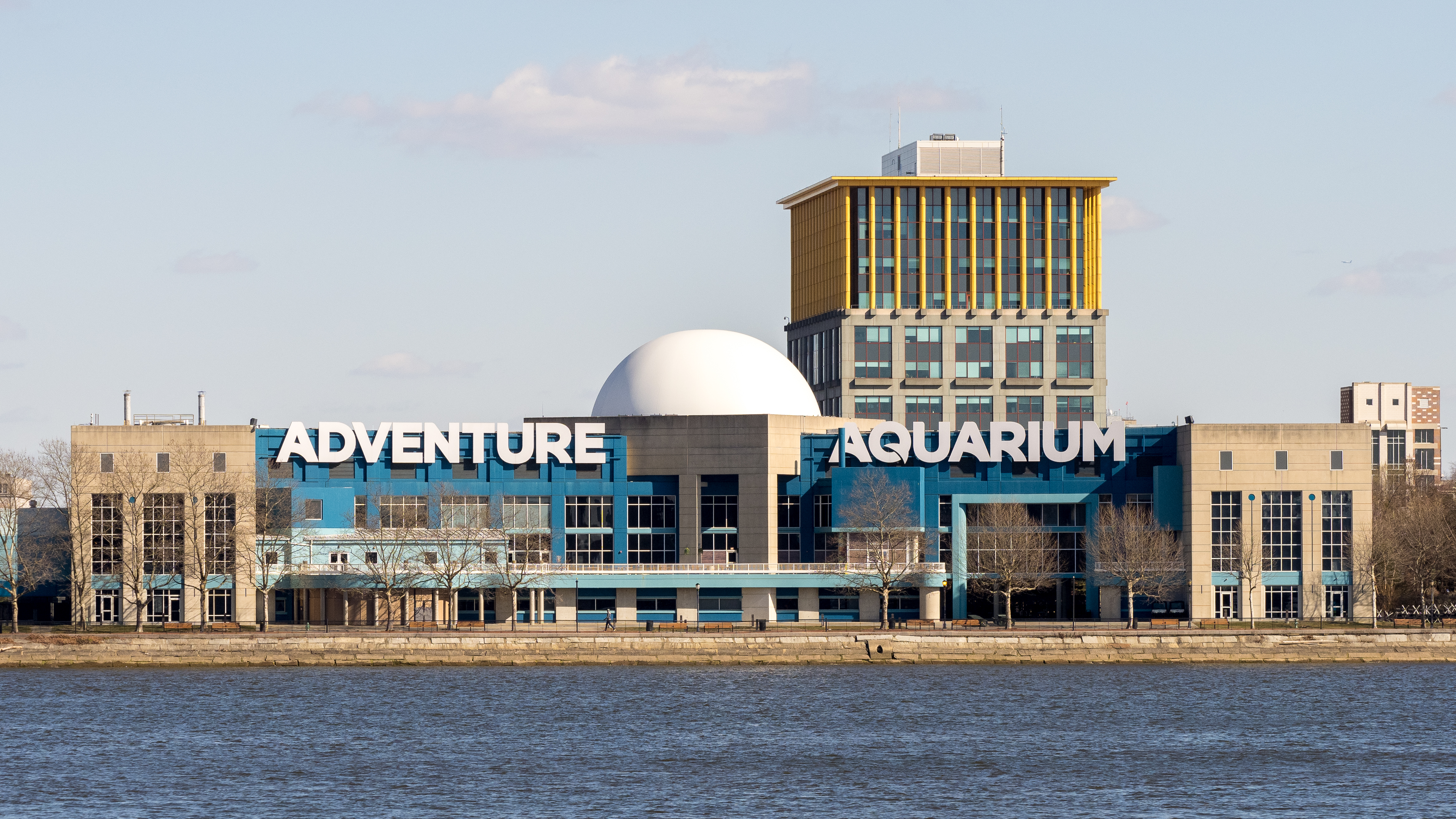
The Adventure Aquarium

The Adventure Aquarium originally opened in 1992 as the New Jersey State Aquarium at Camden. In 2005, after extensive renovation, the aquarium was reopened under the name Adventure Aquarium. The aquarium was one of the original centerpieces in Camden's plans for revitalizing their city.

The Freedom Mortgage Pavilion, formerly known as the BB&T Pavilion, Susquehanna Bank Center, and Tweeter Center, is a 25,000-seat open-air concert amphitheater that was opened in 1995 and renamed after a 2008 deal in which the bank would pay $10 million over 15 years for naming rights.

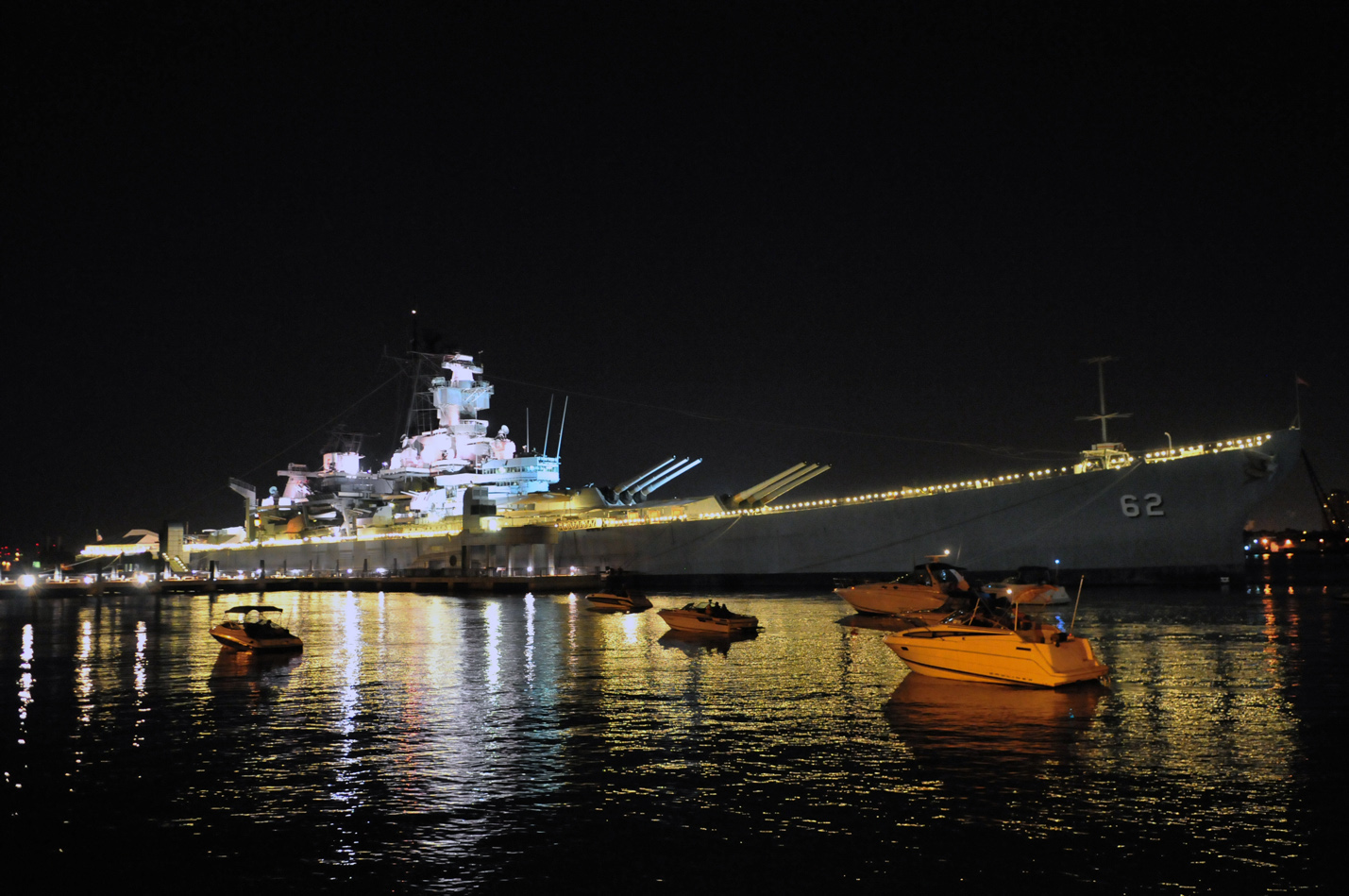
The USS New Jersey (BB-62)

The USS New Jersey (BB-62) was a U.S. Navy battleship that was intermittently active between the years 1943 and 1991. After its retirement, the ship was turned into the Battleship New Jersey Museum and Memorial, that opened in 2001 along the waterfront. The New Jersey saw action during World War II, the Korean War, the Vietnam War, and provided support off Lebanon in early 1983.

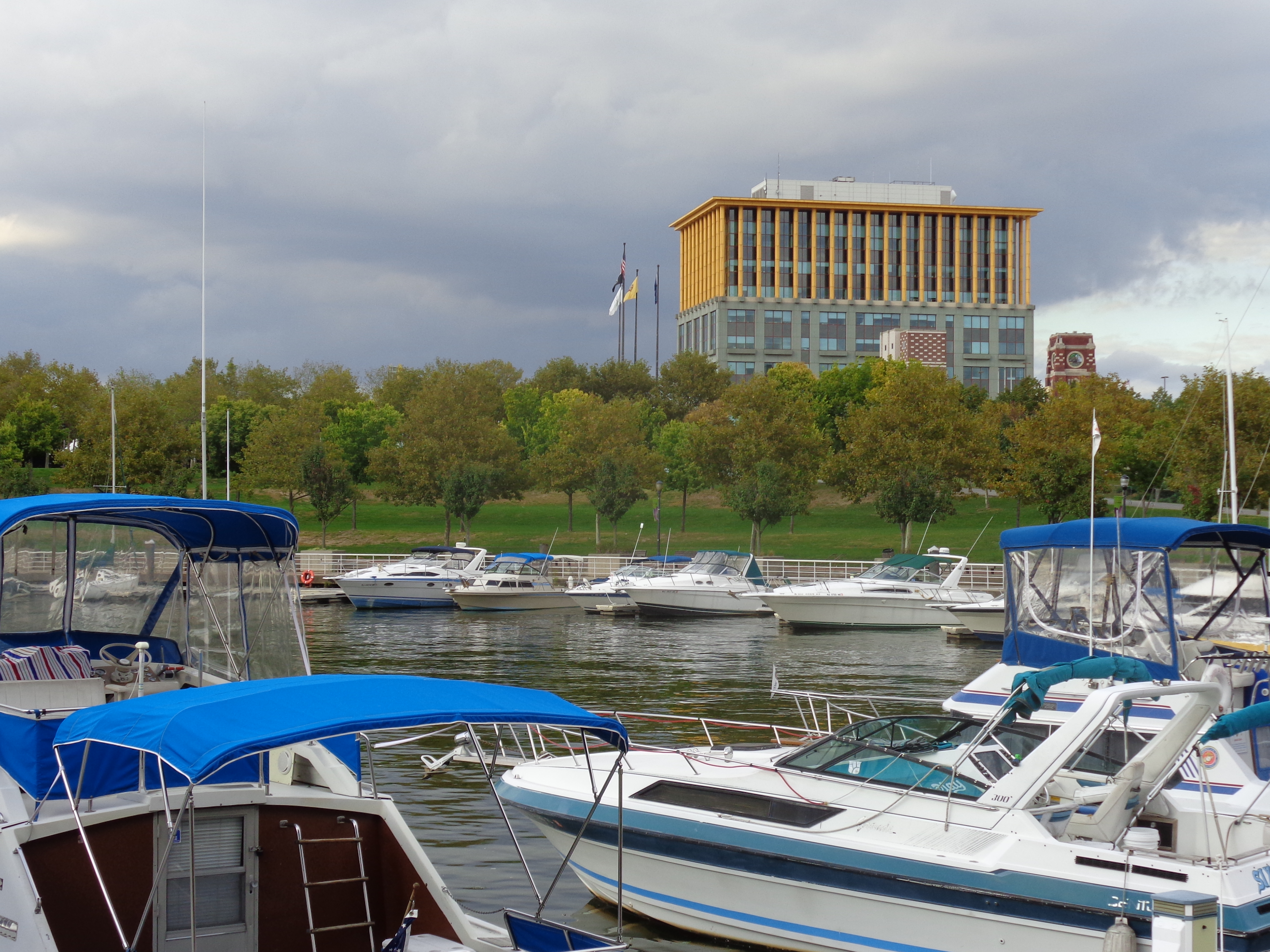
Wiggins Park Marina and One Port Center

Other attractions at the Waterfront are the Ulysses Wiggins Park Riverstage and Marina, One Port Center, Nipper Building (aka Victor Lofts), the Walt Whitman House, the Walt Whitman Cultural Arts Center, the Rutgers–Camden Center For The Arts and the Camden Children's Garden.

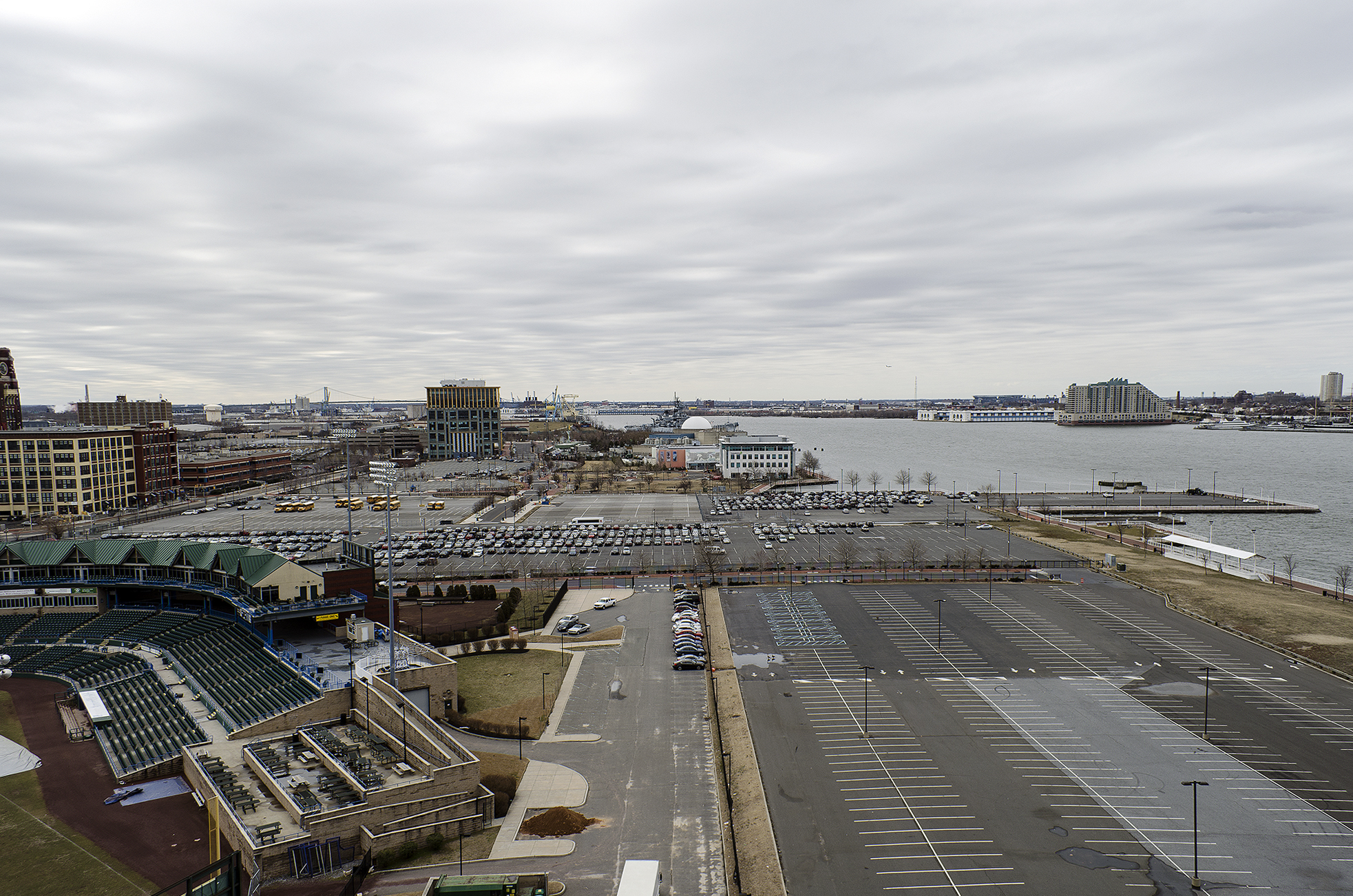
Looking south to the waterfront with Campbell's Field and Nipper Building on left and site of Liberty Property Trust project, Camden Towers, including headquarters of American Water Works

In May 2013, the New Jersey Economic Development Authority announced that it would seek developers for the site of the demolished Riverfront State Prison just north of the Central Waterfront and the Ben Franklin Bridge in Cooper Point. In September 2013 Waterfront Renaissance Associates announced that it proposed to a develop a 2.3-million-square-foot commercial complex on 16 acres (6.5 ha) called the Riverfront World Trade Center. The project would be built in four phases, the first of which would be a promenade along the Delaware River. The plan calls for two 22-story and two 18-story buildings. However, this proposal never came to pass.

In September 2016 the Philadelphia 76ers opened the Philadelphia 76ers Training Complex on the Waterfront. The new headquarters and the state-of-the-art, 120,000-square-foot practice center was made possible in part by $82 million in tax credits approved by the New Jersey Economic Development Authority.

== Development incentives ==
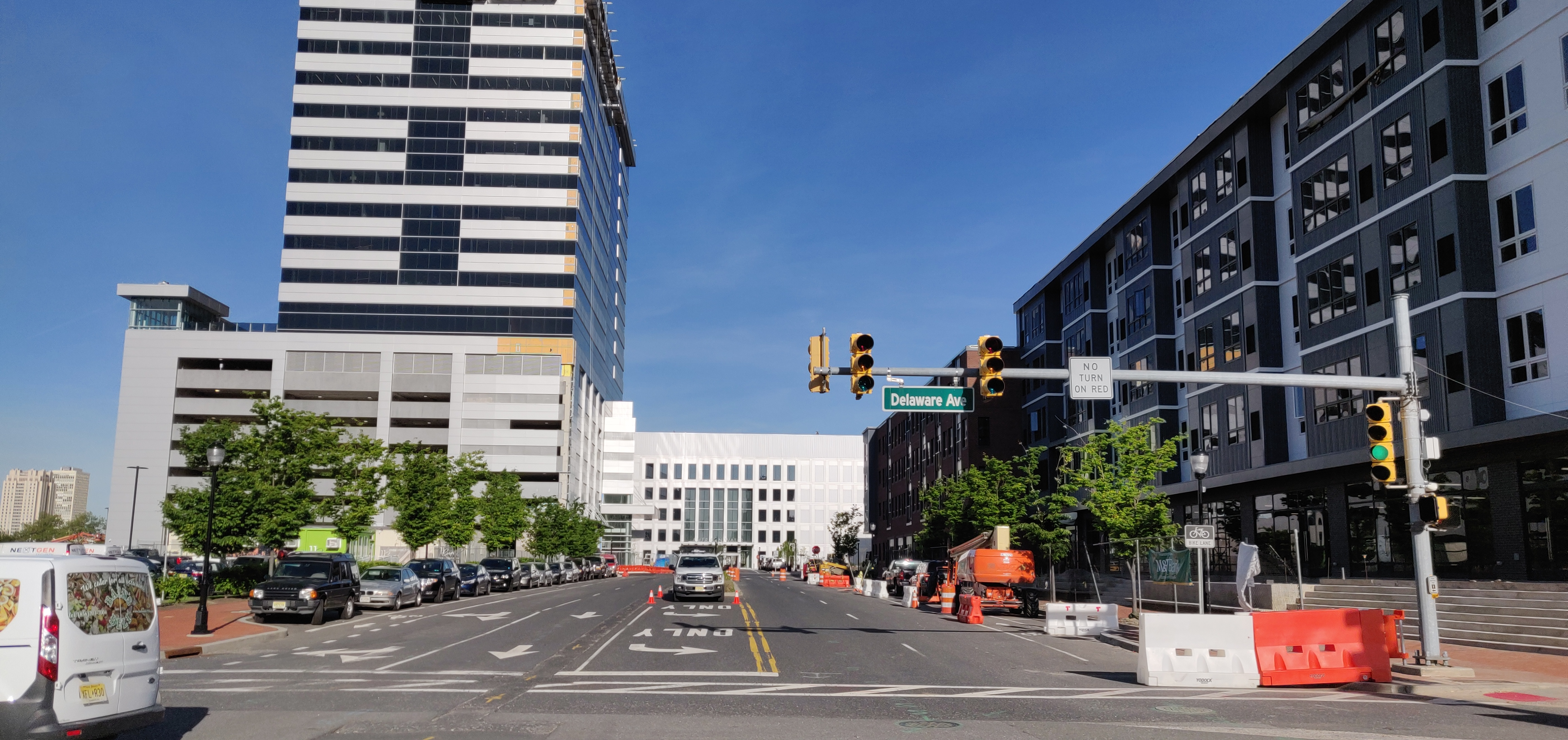
At the foot of Cooper Street

In October 2013, Herschend Family Entertainment announced they would add an attraction adjacent to the Adventure Aquarium, a 300 ft (91 m), 25-story observation tower ride with a moored balloon and gondola that would carry passengers above the site offering views of city, the Delaware River and the Philadelphia skyline. It was planned to open in Spring 2015.

The state of New Jersey has offered numerous tax incentives to corporations to locate in Camden, many along the Waterfront and Port of Camden districts. In November 2014, the state offered tax incentives to Lockheed Martin to relocate 250 jobs to labs at the L-3 Building and Waterfront Technology Center. Proposals to build two towers 590 ft (180 m) and 450 ft (140 m) were unveiled in September 2015. Other elements of the project began construction in December 2016. American Water Works opened its new headquarters. A new Hilton Garden Hotel broke ground in May 2019.

== See also ==
- Barnegat (lightship)
- Cooper Grant Historic District
- List of tallest buildings in Camden
