= List of tallest buildings in Camden =

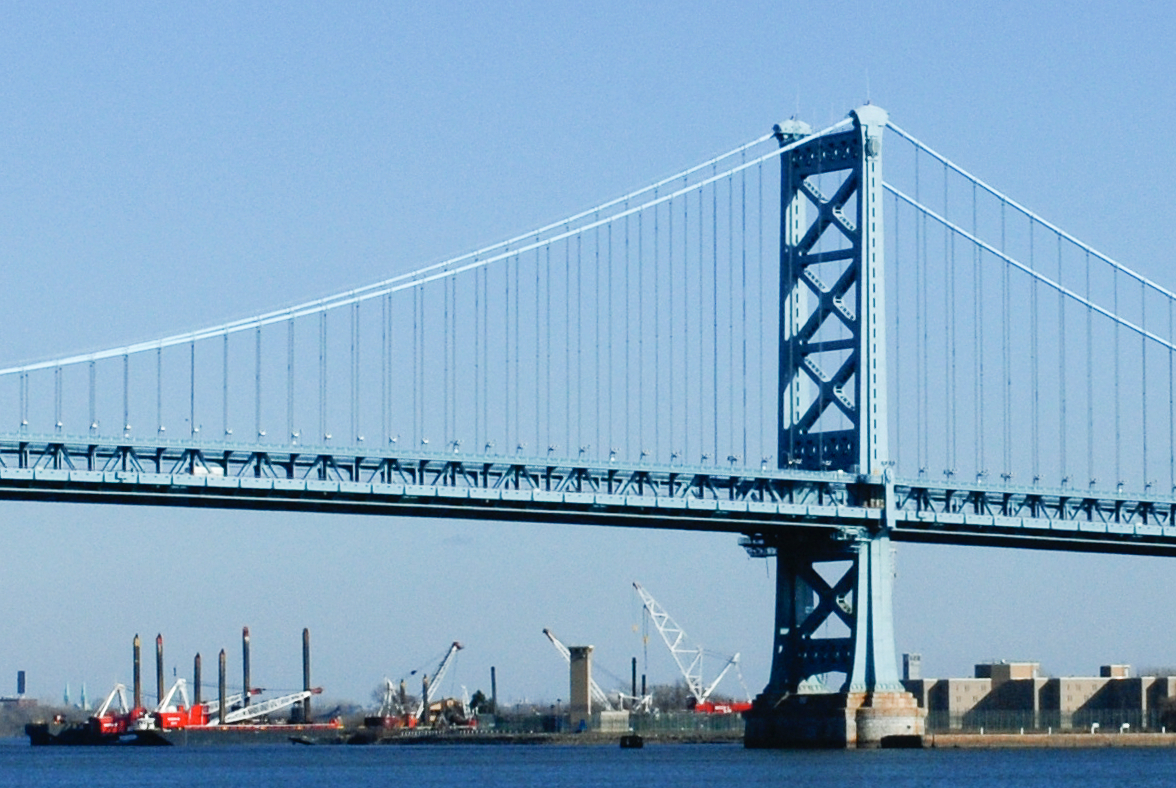
The Benjamin Franklin Bridge eastern tower at 380 ft (120 m) is tallest structure in Camden

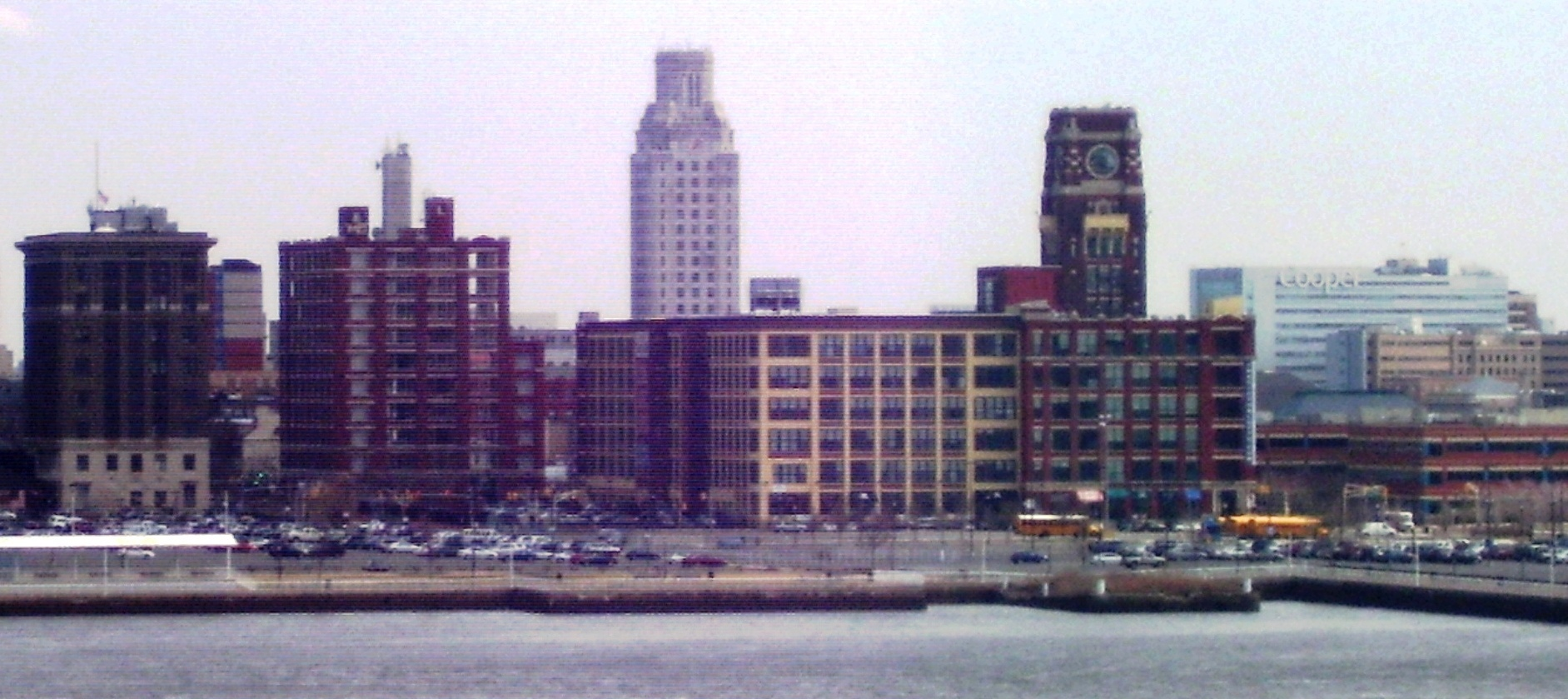
RCA Victor buildings and City Hall

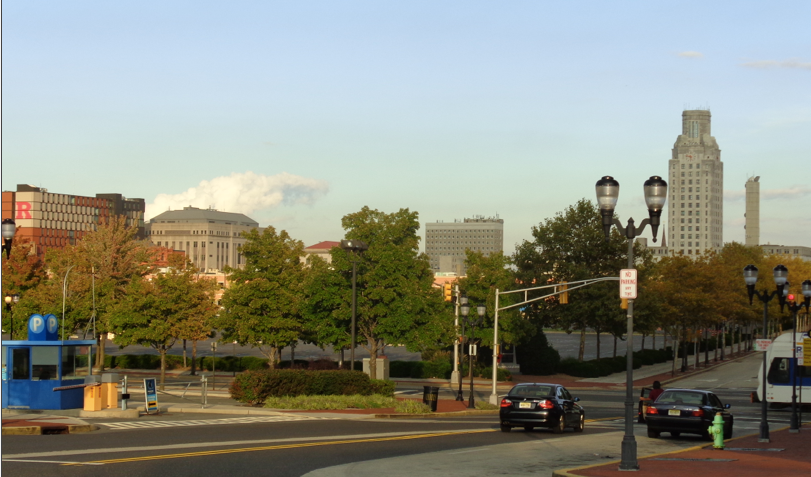
View to 330 Cooper, Mitchell Courthouse, Wilson Building, and City Hall

Camden, New Jersey, United States, is located on the Delaware River in the Philadelphia metropolitan area. At 380 ft (120 m), a tower of the Benjamin Franklin Bridge is the tallest structure in the city. Camden City Hall, at 370 ft (110 m), has been the tallest building in the city since 1931. Several buildings of the Victor Talking Machine Company (which became part of RCA Victor in 1929) dot the city's skyline, which also includes late–20th century residential high-rises.

== Tallest buildings ==
Rank	Name	Image	Neighborhood	Height ft / m	Floors	Year	Notes
1	Camden City Hall		Downtown	371 ft (113 m)	18	1931	Tallest building in Camden since 1931. and tallest in the Philadelphia metropolitan area outside of Philadelphia.
2	Northgate II		North Camden	226 ft (69 m)	23	1979	Residential highrise
3	Triad1828 Centre		Waterfront	220 ft (67 m)	18	2018	
4	Northgate I		North Camden	200 ft (61 m)	21	1962	Residential highrise
5	330 Cooper		Cooper-Grant	148 ft (45 m)	12	2012	Rutgers-Camden student housing
6	Our Lady of Lourdes Medical Center		Parkside; Gateway	141 ft (43 m)	10	1950	
7	Nipper Building		Waterfront; Cooper-Grant	121 ft (37 m) plus tower	10	1916	Residences known as The Victor inspired by Nipper logo for the RCA Victor when it was known as Building 17.
8	One Port Center		Central Waterfront	135 ft (41 m)	11	1996	Delaware River Port Authority
9	Riverview Towers		Waterfront	130 ft (40 m)	15	1977	Residential high-rise
10	Keleman Pavilion		Lanning Square	130 ft (40 m)	10	1978	Cooper University Hospital
11	Wilson Building		Downtown	125 ft (38 m)	12	1926	Commercial
12	Victor Executive Building		Cooper-Grant	125 ft (38 m)	8	1916	RCA Building No. 2. also once home to Camden City Public Schools
12	RCA Factory Building No. 8		Cooper-Grant; Waterfront	125 ft (38 m)	10	1924	Radio Lofts (proposed)
13	Roberts Pavilion		Lanning Square	121 ft (37 m)	10	2008	Cooper University Hospital
14	Camden Tower		Cooper-Grant	121 ft (37 m)	10	1989	Rutgers-Camden housing
15	JFK Towers		Marlton	121 ft (37 m)	10	1964	Residential highrise
16	Mitchell H. Cohen US Courthouse		Cooper Grant		6	1994	United States District Court for the District of New Jersey

== Proposed ==
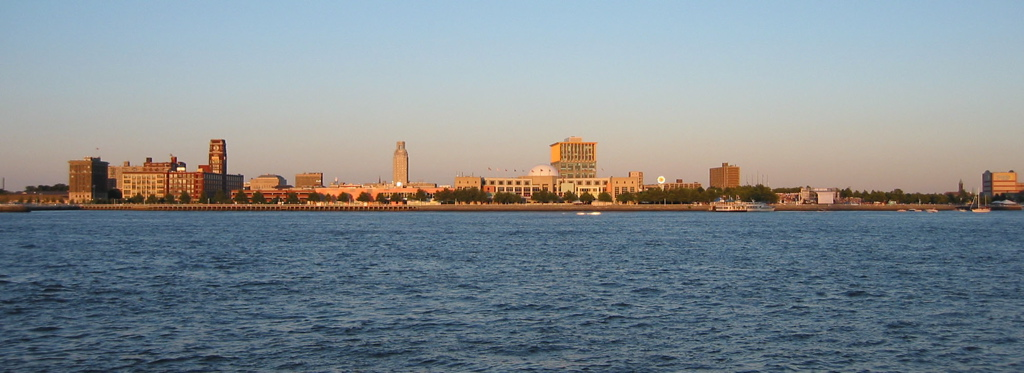
Camden skyline from Philadelphia

In May 2013 the New Jersey Economic Development Authority announced that it would seek developers for the site of the demolished Riverfront State Prison just north of the Central Waterfront and the Benjamin Franklin Bridge in Cooper Point. In September 2013 Waterfront Renaissance Associates announced that it proposed to a develop a 2.3-million-square-foot commercial complex on 16 acres (6.5 ha) called the Riverfront World Trade Center. The project would be built in four phases, the first of which would be a promenade along the Delaware River.The plan calls for two 22-story and two 18-story buildings.

In October 2013, Herschend Family Entertainment announced they would add an attraction adjacent to the Adventure Aquarium, a 300 ft (91 m), 25-story observation tower ride with a moored balloon and gondola that would carry passengers above the site offering views of city, the Delaware River and the Philadelphia skyline to be built by Skyview Tower Systems. The 300 ft (91 m) Skyview Tower, a combination gyro tower and moored balloon, in the city's entertainment district on the Camden Waterfront was expected to open in 2015. The structure is three rod towers joined at intervals by circular hoops Propelled by a winch, lightweight carriage disguised within the balloon envelope ascends the tower. The gondola beneath the balloon acts as floating circular walkway for a maximum of 40 passengers.

In September 2015, Liberty Property Trust unveiled a proposal to build two towers, one 590 ft (180 m) tall and another 450 ft (140 m) as part a master plan on the waterfront designed by Robert A. M. Stern. Called Camden Towers it all include an 18-story building the waterfront. Construction began in 2017.

In 2024, Cooper University Hospital announced a $3 billion expansion which would include several mid-rise towers, construction of which begin in 2025.

The Beacon Building is a proposed 25-story tower adjacent to the Walter Rand Transportation Center.

== See also ==
- National Register of Historic Places listings in Camden County, New Jersey
- List of tallest buildings in New Jersey
- List of tallest buildings in Philadelphia
- List of tallest buildings in Wilmington
