= Sinople =

Sinople may refer to:

- Sinopia, or sinople, a dark reddish earth pigment
- Sinople (heraldry), a term for "red", and later "green" in heraldry
- Plovdiv, Bulgaria, a city called “Sinople” by the Crusaders
