= Camden City Hall =

City hall of Camden, New Jersey, U.S.

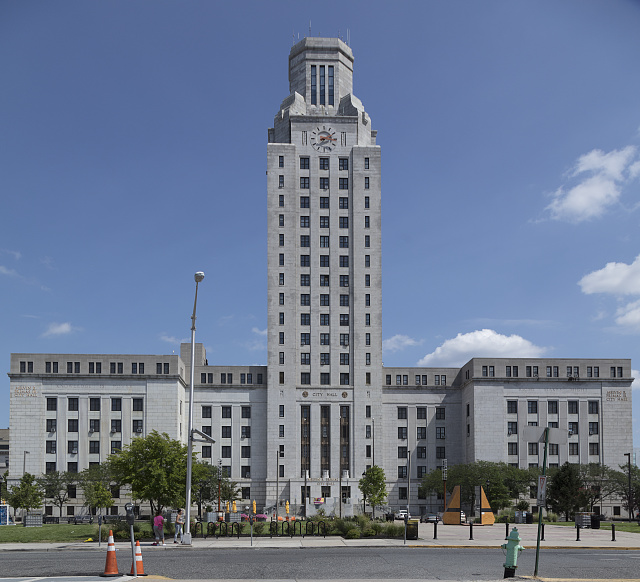
- A frontal view of City Hall from Roosevelt Plaza Park facing eastward
- Interactive map of the Camden City Hall area

General information
- Status: Completed
- Architectural style: Neoclassicism
- Location: 520 Market Street; Camden, NJ 08102
- Coordinates: 39°56′41″N 75°7′12″W
- Construction started: 1929
- Completed: 1931

Height
- Height: 371 ft (113 m)

Technical details
- Floor count: 18

Design and construction
- Architects: Edwards and Green

Camden City Hall is the house of government for the City of Camden and Camden County in the U.S. state of New Jersey. At 371 feet (113 m) it is the tallest building in Camden, the tallest municipal building in New Jersey, and the tallest building within the Philadelphia metropolitan area outside of Philadelphia itself. In November 2012, Camden County renamed the building Melvin R. Primas Jr. City Hall after Randy Primas, the city's first Black mayor who served from 1981 through 1990.

== Building ==
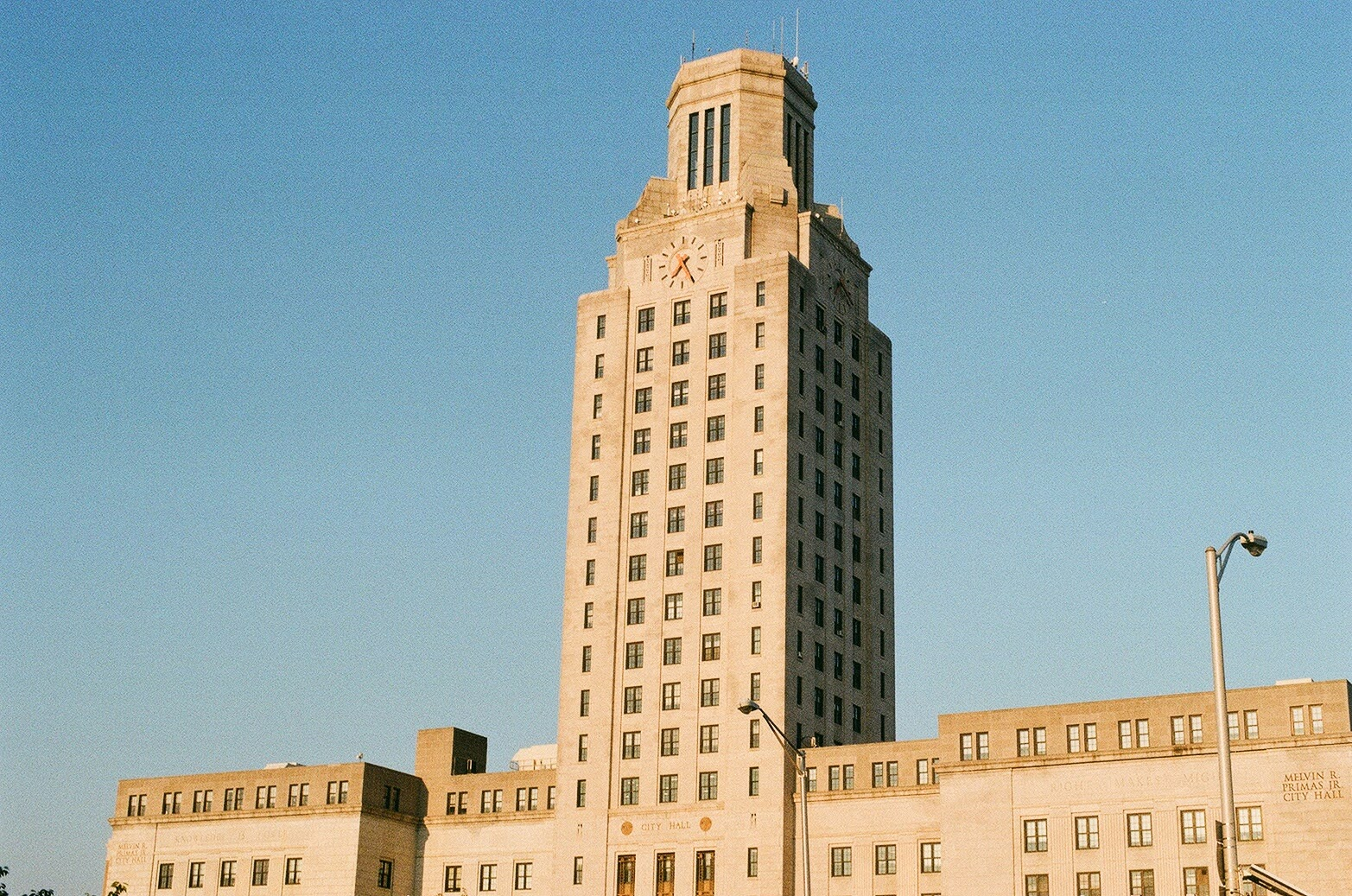
A view of the top of City Hall in Camden, NJ

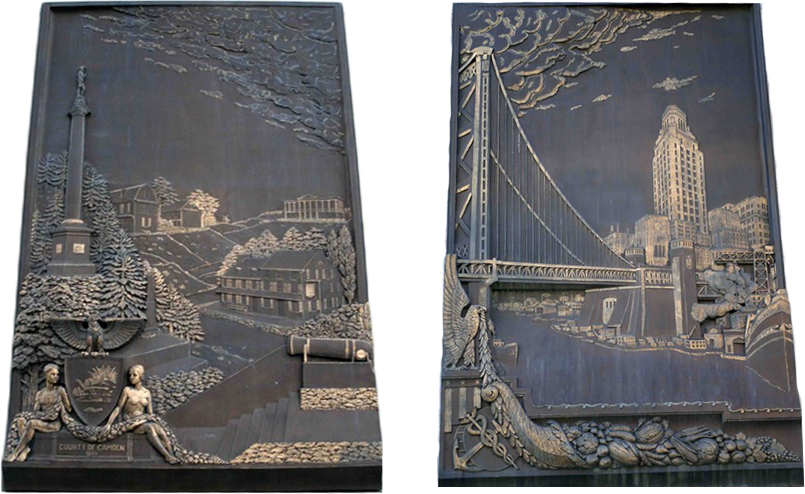
The two bronze reliefs featured on the back of Camden's city hall

The city hall was designed by Byron Edwards and Alfred Green, architectural partners who studied at the Beaux-Arts Institute of Design in Philadelphia, then moved from Philadelphia to Camden in 1928; its materials were supplied by the Otis Elevator Company and it was constructed between 1929 and 1931. It features a slender 18-story tower rising from a massive six-story base, and its facade is composed of light gray granite. The building's architecture is described by the New Jersey Historic Trust as "restrained Art-Deco style" while The Philadelphia Inquirer called it neoclassical.

At the top of the tower is a large clock, consistent with a Camden tradition of city hall featuring a clock that began in 1876.

The front of City Hall's base is inscribed with the aphorisms "Knowledge is power" and "Right makes might" while the back facade bears the lines "Reason is the life of law" (attributed to Edward Coke) and "No Legacy is so Rich as Honesty" from All's Well that Ends Well. Likewise, the north side wall reads "Where There is no Vision the People Perish," a quote from Proverbs 29:18 of the King James Bible, while the south side wall is engraved with "In a dream I saw a city invincible," which is an excerpt from the poem "I Dream'd in a Dream" by Walt Whitman as well as the current motto of Camden.

At each side of the base's back there is a 20' x 15' bronze relief, both created in 1930 by E. Vonhebel. The north side relief depicts an early, pre-industrial Camden County with nude figures interpreted as Adam and Eve, whereas the south side relief portrays an industrialized Camden with dense buildings, the Benjamin Franklin Bridge, and City Hall itself visible.

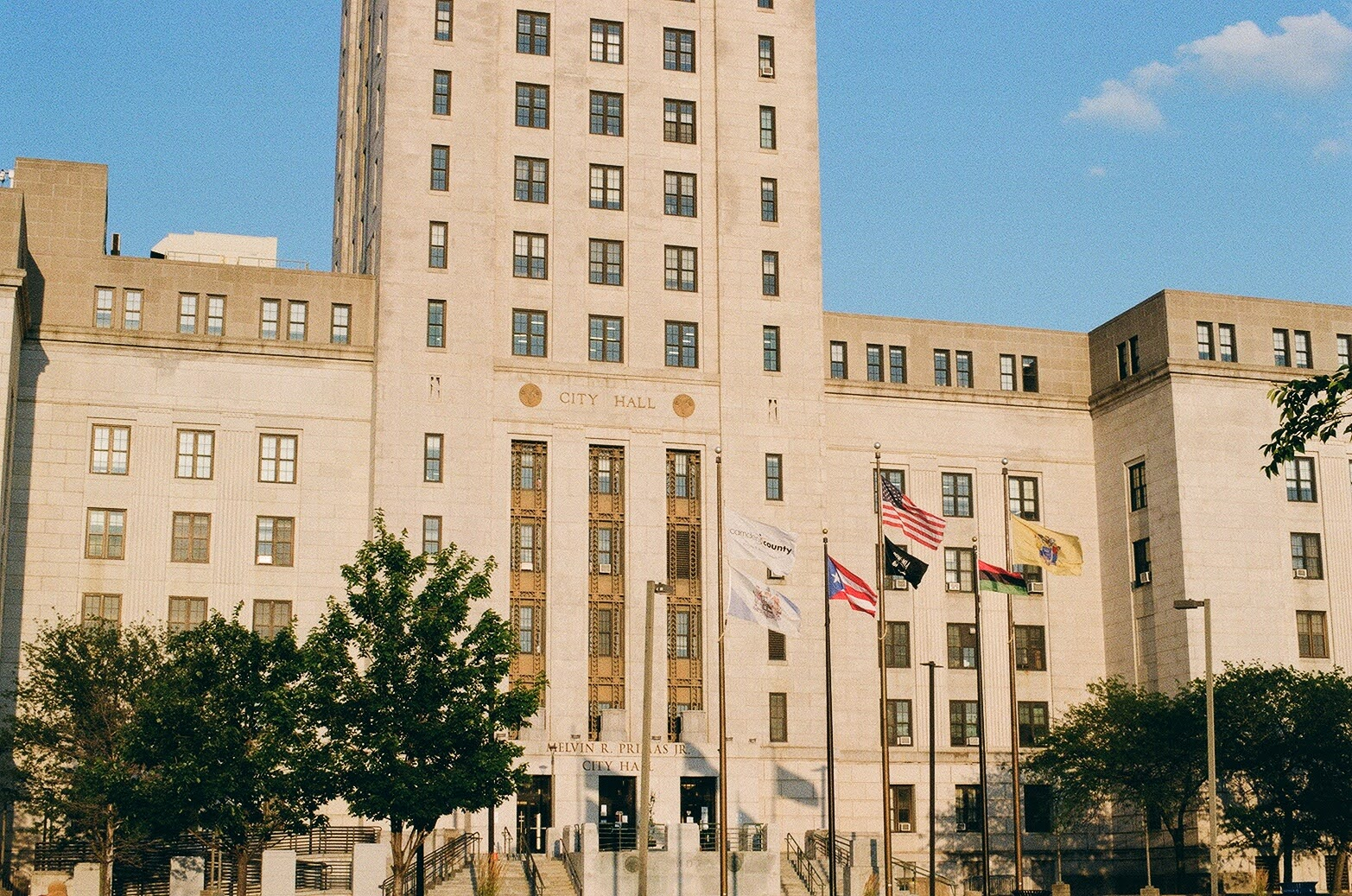
A view of the flags in front of City Hall in Camden, NJ

Roosevelt Park is situated in front of City Hall, to its west. In December 2025 Camden received a $5.7 million grant from the New Jersey EDA, allocating $1.1 million to Roosevelt Park for landscaping, additional outdoor seating, and a food stand occupied by rotating vendors. The back of City Hall was bounded by the county's Aletha R. Wright Administration Building until 2023 when it was demolished; the site was replaced by a second park in May 2024.

The design of Camden City Hall has been linked to the University of Texas at Austin's Main Building tower: there are stylistic similarities; that building's architect, Paul Cret, had been a lecturer at the school where Green and Edwards, City Hall's architects, studied; and Cret lived in nearby Philadelphia while designing the UT tower in the early 1930s.

== Old City Hall ==
Camden's first city hall was built in 1876 at the corner of Benson Street and Haddon Avenue, where present day Cooper University Hospital (Kelemen Pavilion at 1 Cooper Plaza) is located. The building featured a clock tower and was demolished in 1930.

== See also ==
- List of tallest buildings in Camden
