= Wilson Building (Camden, New Jersey) =

- U.S. National Register of Historic Places
- New Jersey Register of Historic Places
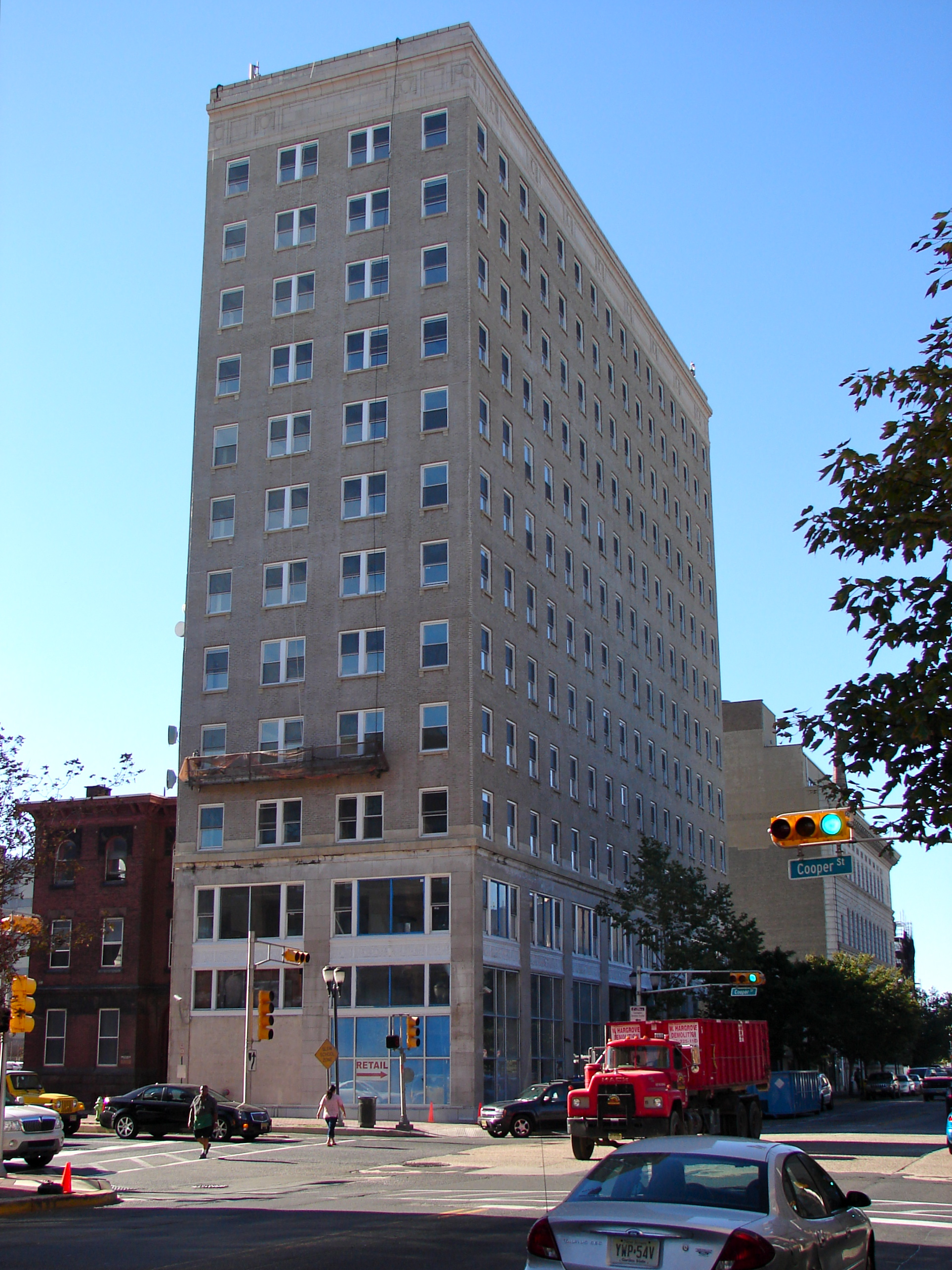

- Location within Camden County, New Jersey Location within New Jersey Location within the United States
- Location: Cooper Street and Broadway, Camden, New Jersey
- Coordinates: 39°56′46″N 75°7′8″W
- Area: less than one acre
- Built: 1926
- Architect: Rothschild, Leroy B.; Roberts & Roller
- Architectural style: Classical Revival
- MPS: Banks, Insurance, and Legal Buildings in Camden, New Jersey, 1873-1938 MPS
- NRHP reference No.: 90001259
- NJRHP No.: 936

Significant dates
- Added to NRHP: August 24, 1990
- Designated NJRHP: January 11, 1990

The Wilson Building is located at 129 N. Broadway in Camden, Camden County, New Jersey, United States. The building was built in 1926 and was added to the National Register of Historic Places on August 24, 1990. Renovation of the building began in 2009. The building presently houses the Camden campus of Rowan University, along with other businesses.

== See also ==
- National Register of Historic Places listings in Camden County, New Jersey
- List of tallest buildings in Camden
