= Nipper Building =

Residential building in Camden, New Jersey

- Building 17, RCA Victor Company, Camden Plant
- U.S. National Register of Historic Places
- New Jersey Register of Historic Places
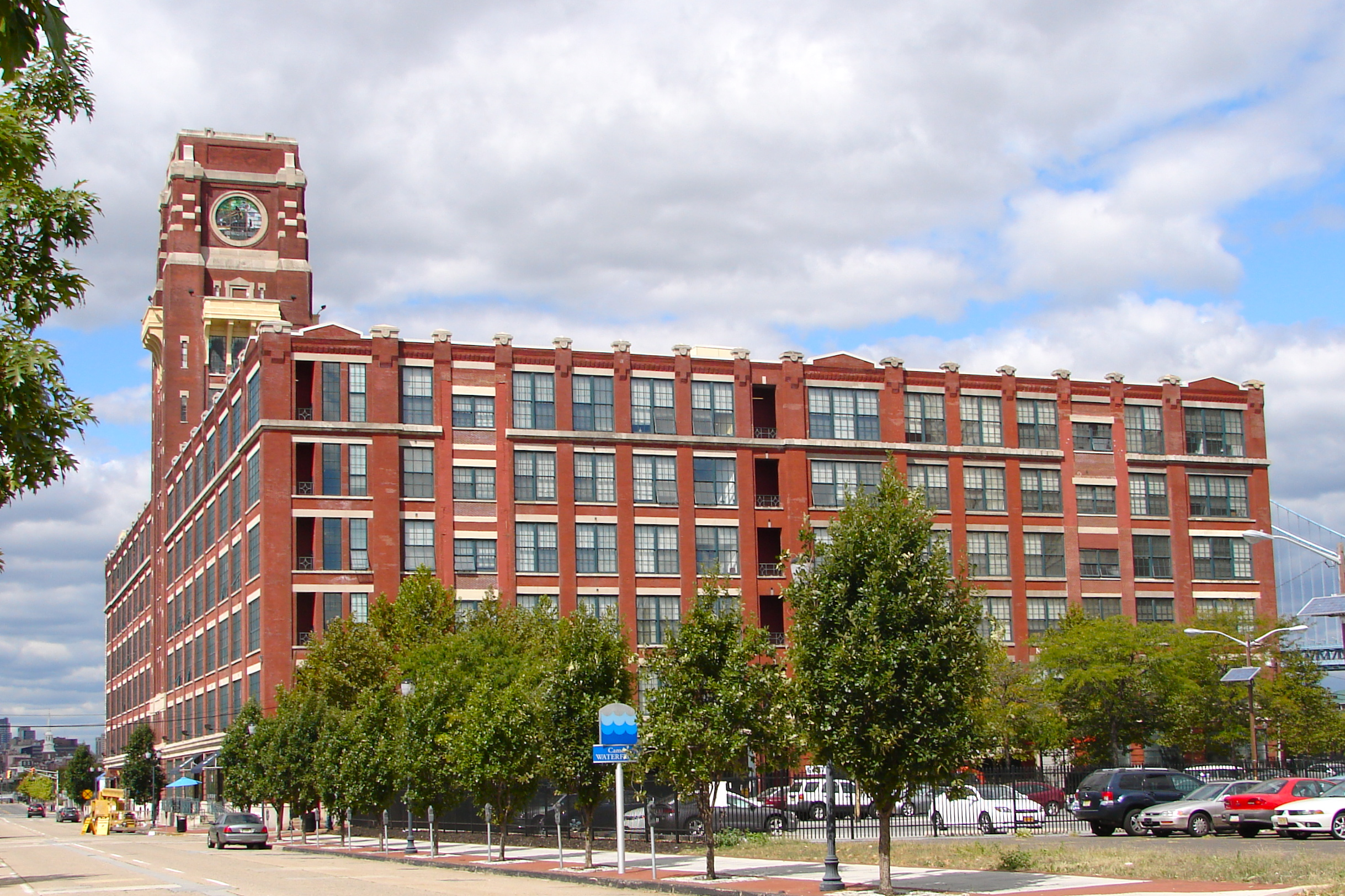

- Location within Camden County, New Jersey Location within New Jersey Location within the United States
- Location: 1 Market Street, Camden, New Jersey
- Coordinates: 39.947284°N 75.127091°W
- Area: 3.7 acres (1.5 ha)
- Built: 1909
- Architect: Ballinger & Perrot
- Architectural style: Classical Revival
- NRHP reference No.: 02001253
- NJRHP No.: 3033

Significant dates
- Added to NRHP: October 4, 2002
- Designated NJRHP: September 18, 2002

The Nipper Building is a colloquial name for The Victor condominiums, and formerly, Building 17, RCA Victor Company, Camden Plant. The structure is a historic building located in Cooper Grant neighborhood of Camden, Camden County, New Jersey, United States. Since 1901, Camden was the headquarters of the Victor Talking Machine Company, later RCA Victor. Originally a Victrola cabinet factory, the building was converted into luxury apartments and retail space in 2004.

== History ==
The Nipper Building, now known as 'The Victor', was originally constructed during 1909–1916, by the architectural and engineering firm of Ballinger & Perrot.

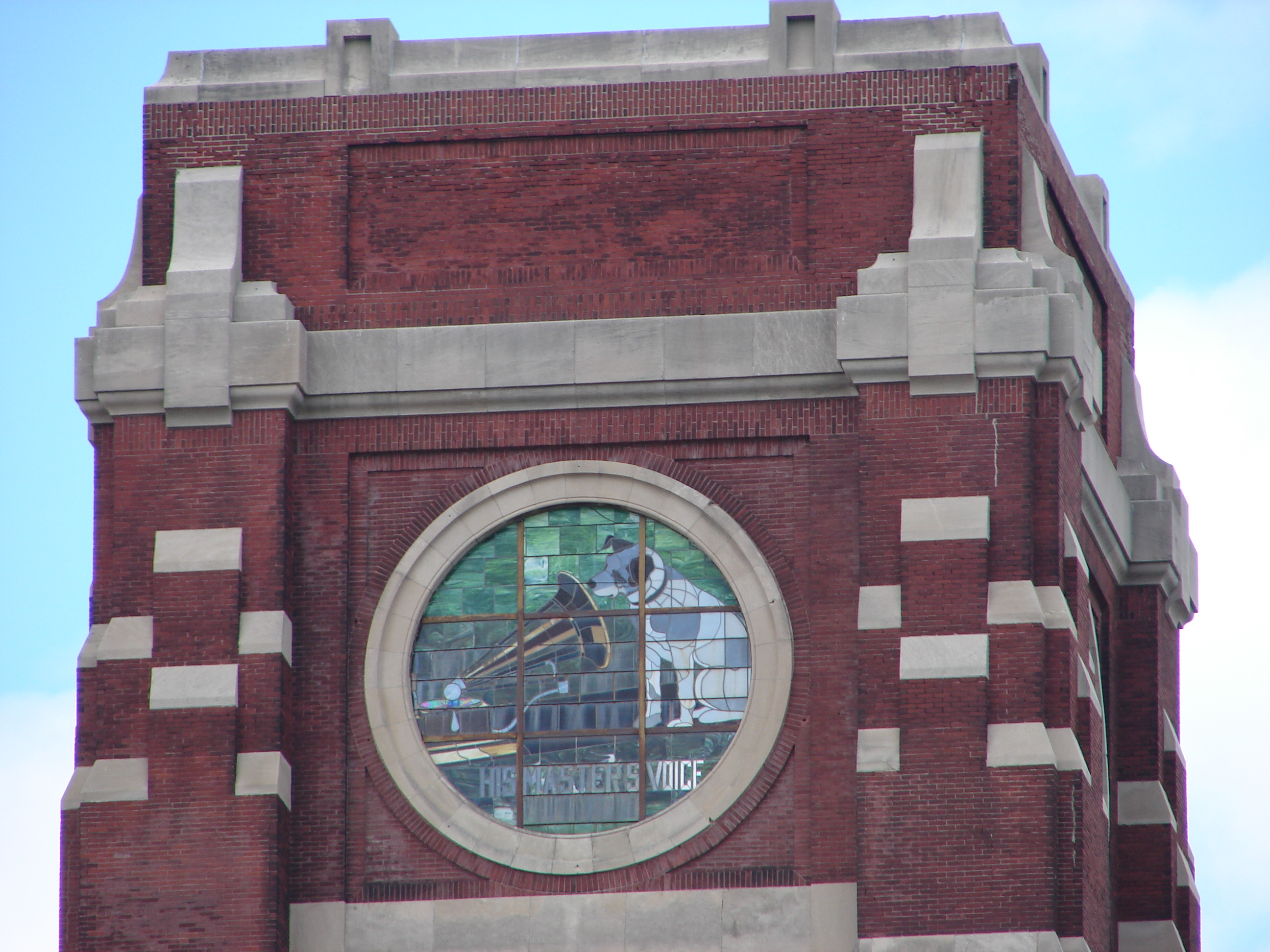
Stained glass window in the building's tower featuring Nipper.

Francis Barraud, an unknown British artist, painted a picture of his brother's dog, "Nipper", sitting attentively in front of a gramophone. Nipper, a mixed-breed dog with probable terrier ancestry, became the best known dog in the world. The painting, called His Master's Voice, was sold to the British Gramophone Company Ltd. and eventually became the trademarks of both the Gramophone Company and its new American affiliate, the Victor Talking Machine Company in 1901. In 1929, the Radio Corporation of America purchased the Victor Company and the acquisition included the Camden manufacturing plant and the "His Master's Voice" trademark. The four stained glass windows in the buildings tower depicting the "His Master's Voice" trademark were manufactured by D'Ascenzo Studios in Philadelphia and originally installed in 1915. The windows were illuminated at night and could be seen for several miles. In 1968, RCA introduced a new corporate logo and virtually retired both the "Victor" and Nipper/"His Master's Voice" trademarks. The windows were removed from the tower in 1969 and replaced with the new RCA logo painted on large sheets of plywood. Beginning in 1976, in response to public demand, RCA revived the "His Master's Voice" trademark and reinstated it to RCA record labels and other products. Nipper was again widely used in RCA advertising, company stationery, shipping cartons, store displays and repainted on RCA delivery and service vehicles. Several newspaper articles and news reports about Nipper's return, appeared at the time. April 10, 1979 was proclaimed "Nipper Day" in New Jersey by Governor Brendan Byrne, and RCA held a ceremony in Camden dedicating four new stained glass windows, identical to the originals, which had been reinstalled in the tower of building 17. RCA engaged D'Ascenzo Studios to manufacture the windows, the same firm which made the original windows 64 years earlier. These windows were later damaged by vandals and neglect after General Electric, which had acquired RCA in 1986, vacated the building in 1992. The broken windows were replaced in 2003 after the building was acquired by Dranoff Properties and converted into loft apartments and retail shops.

During the 1970s and 1980s, some parts of the Nipper Building were used by the RCA Government Communications Systems Division, for the development of computer systems for the U.S. intelligence community.

The Nipper Building is listed on the National Register of Historic Places.

== The Victor ==
After GE vacated the Nipper Building in 1992, it deteriorated, was vandalized and became a general eyesore to the surrounding neighborhood and was in danger of demolition. All but a few of the dozens of other old RCA Victor buildings at the Camden site had already been razed. In 1997, the building was listed on Preservation New Jersey's Ten Most Endangered sites list.

Utilizing the Investment Tax Credit, the structure was converted into a complex featuring a mix of 341 upscale loft apartments with outstanding views of the Philadelphia skyline. The restoration was completed in August 2003 at a cost of $65 million. under the guidance of BLT Architects. Approximately 80% of the project's funding came from private sources, namely through Dranoff Properties, Fleet Bank and Related Capital. Remaining funding came from various public sources including the Casino Reinvestment Development Authority, the New Jersey Redevelopment Authority and the Delaware River Port Authority.

== See also ==
- National Register of Historic Places listings in Camden County, New Jersey
- List of tallest buildings in Camden
- Victor Talking Machine Company
- Gramophone Company
- His Master's Voice
- Nipper
- RCA
