= Lanning Square, Camden =

Populated place in Camden County, New Jersey, US

Coordinates: 39.939474°N 75.118051°W

Lanning Square
- Neighborhood of Camden
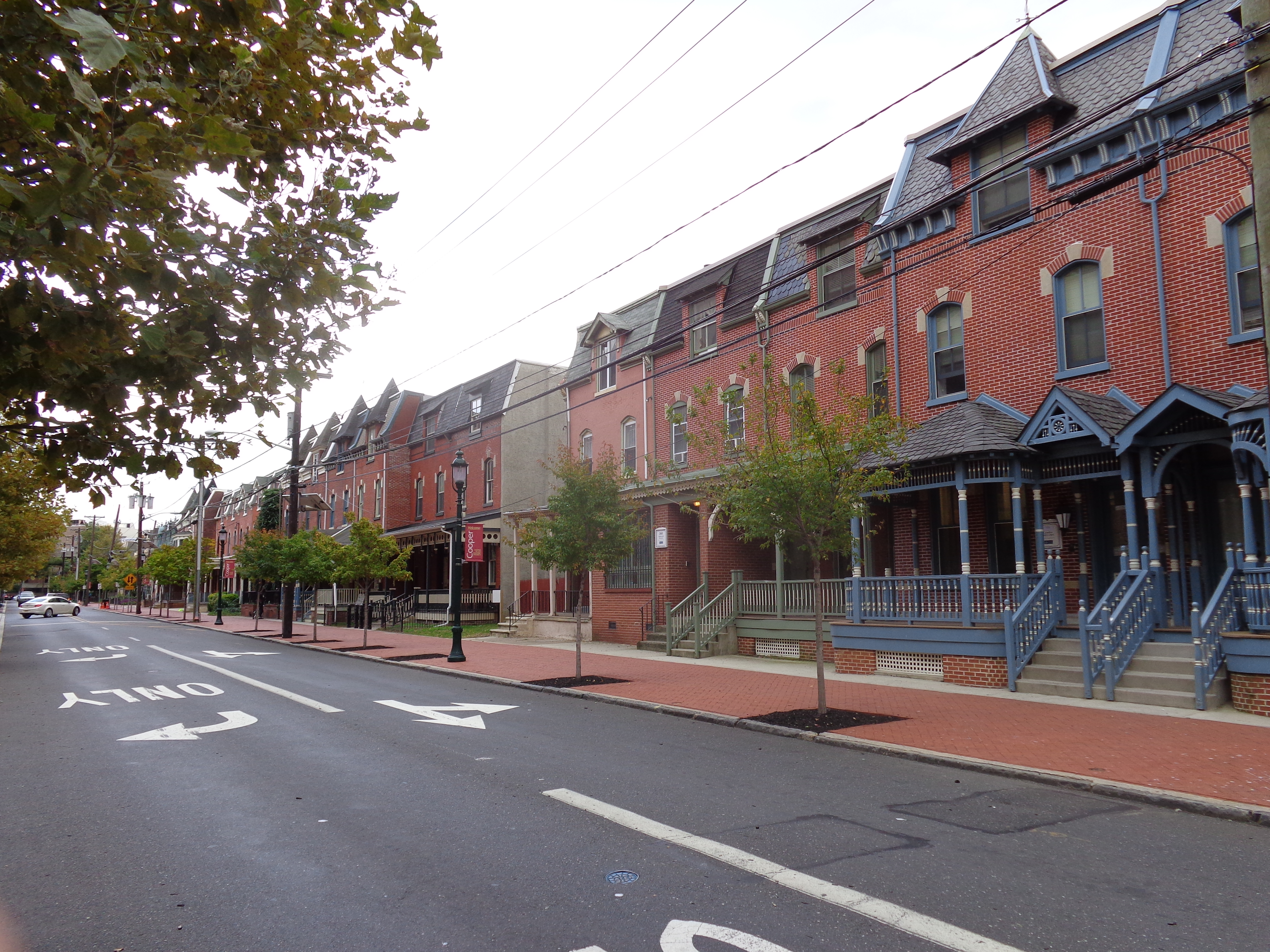
- Row houses in Lanning Square
- Interactive map of Lanning Square
- Country: United States
- State: New Jersey
- County: Camden
- City: Camden
- Area code: 856

Lanning Square is a neighborhood in Camden, New Jersey. It is named for Samuel Laning (1828–1830), the first mayor of Camden. According to the 2000 U.S. census, Lanning Square has a population of 3,989. The neighborhood, sometimes known as Cooper-Lanning, or Cooper Plaza-Lanning Square, is home to Cooper University Hospital and the Coriell Institute for Medical Research. A planned station called Cooper-Campbell for the proposed Glassboro–Camden Line light rail system would stop in the neighbourhood at Haddon Avenue and South 9th Street west of the North-South Freeway.
