= Cooper Street Historic District =

Historic district in New Jersey, United States

- U.S. National Register of Historic Places
- U.S. Historic district
- New Jersey Register of Historic Places
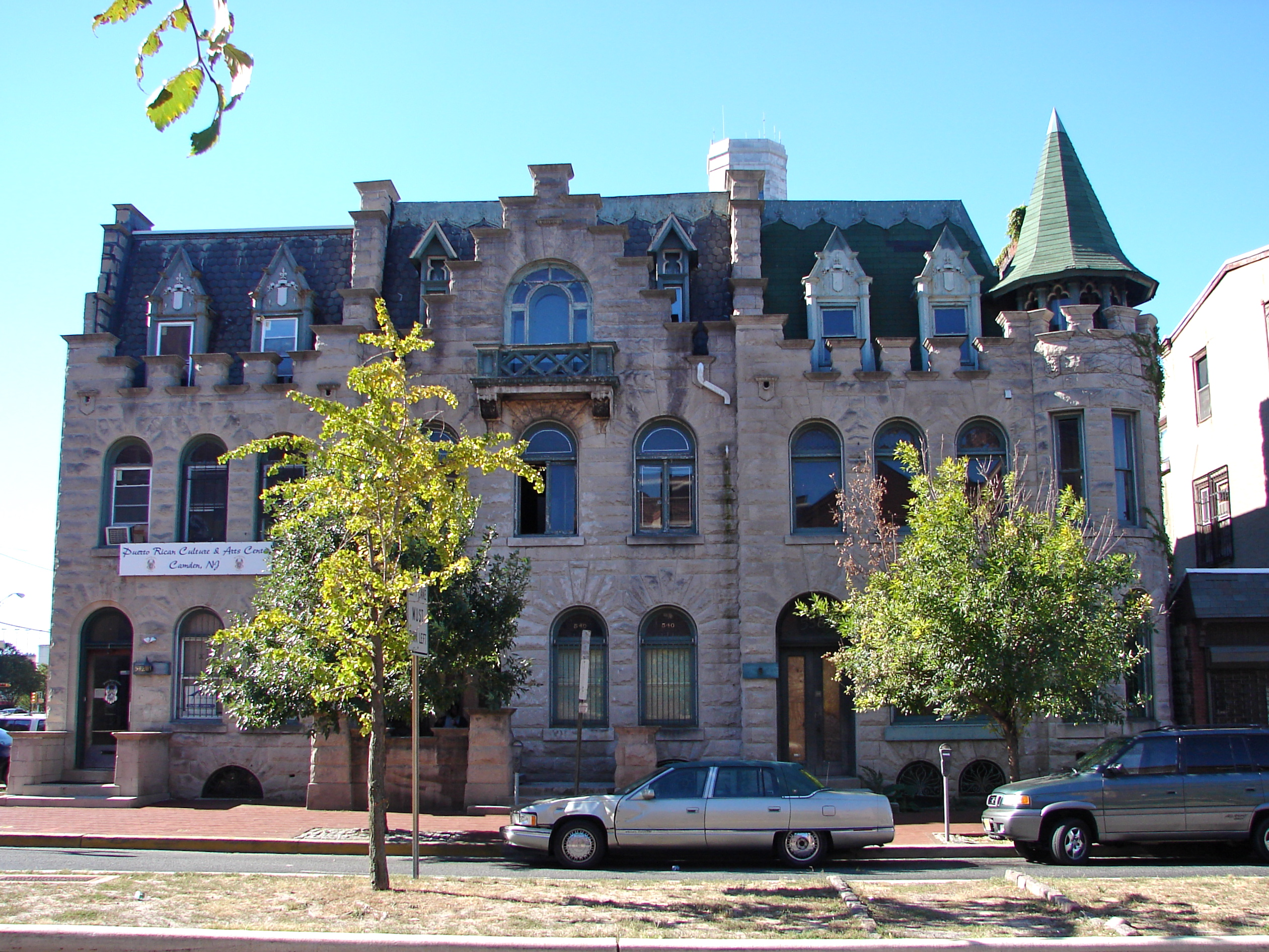
- A building within the Cooper Street Historic District.

- Location within Camden County, New Jersey Location within New Jersey Location within the United States
- Location: Cooper Street from 2nd to 7th Streets, Camden, New Jersey
- Coordinates: 39°56′49″N 75°7′17″W
- Area: 14.9 acres (6.0 ha)
- Built: 1926
- Architect: Multiple
- Architectural style: Greek Revival, Late Victorian, Federal
- NRHP reference No.: 89001057
- NJRHP No.: 904

Significant dates
- Added to NRHP: August 7, 1989
- Designated NJRHP: June 20, 1989

Cooper Street Historic District is a historic district located in Camden, Camden County, New Jersey, United States. The district goes from 2nd Street to 7th Street along Cooper Street and was added to the National Register of Historic Places on August 7, 1989.

== See also ==
- National Register of Historic Places listings in Camden County, New Jersey
