= Sinopia =

Dark reddish-brown natural earth pigment

Color coordinates
- Hex triplet: #CB410B
- sRGB^{B} (r, g, b): (203, 65, 11)
- HSV (h, s, v): (17°, 95%, 80%)
- CIELCh_{uv} (L, C, h): (48, 118, 19°)
- ISCC–NBS descriptor: Vivid reddish orange
- B: Normalized to [0–255] (byte)

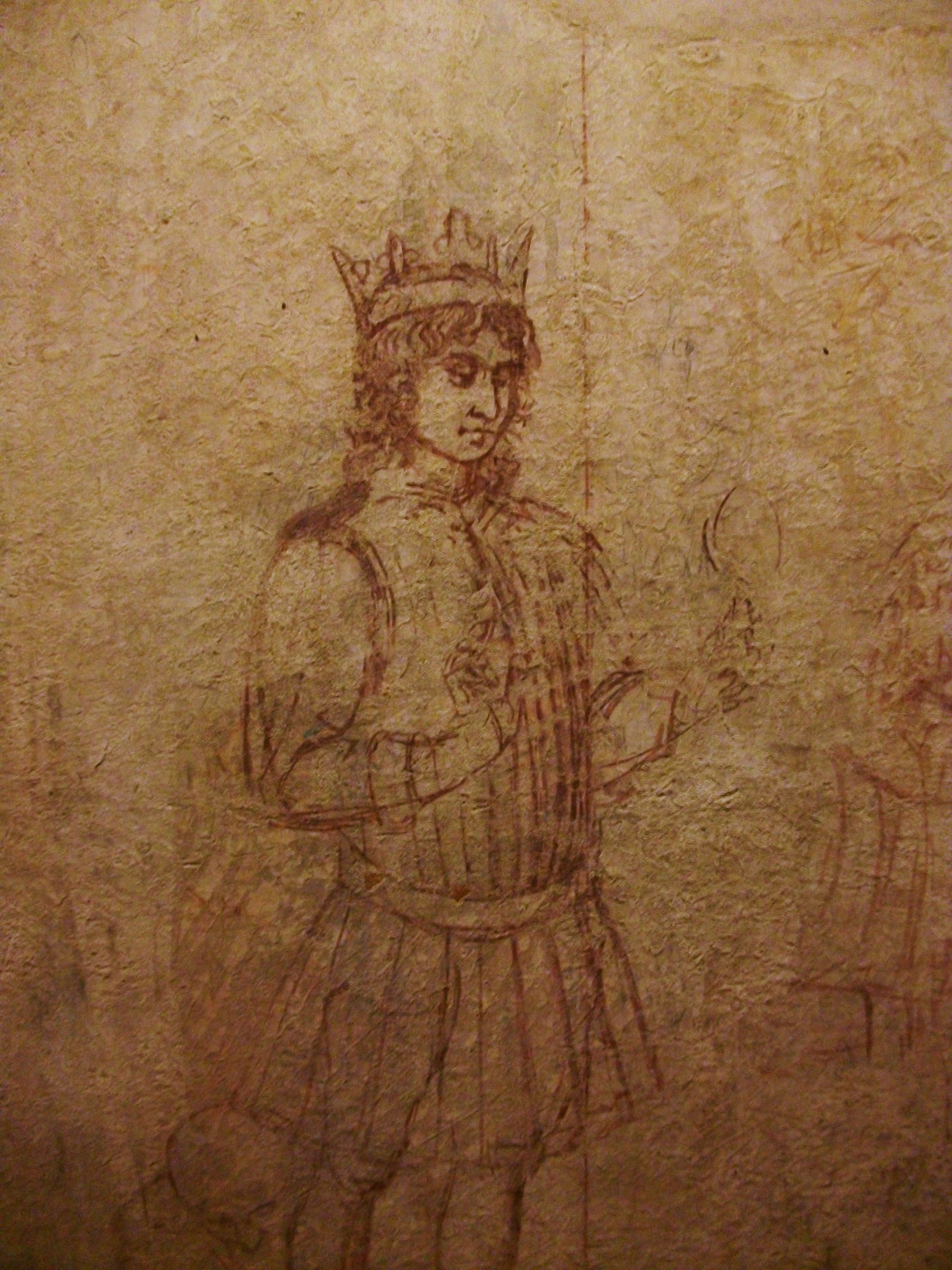
A sinopia showing a king, from the Museum of Sinopie in Pisa, Italy.

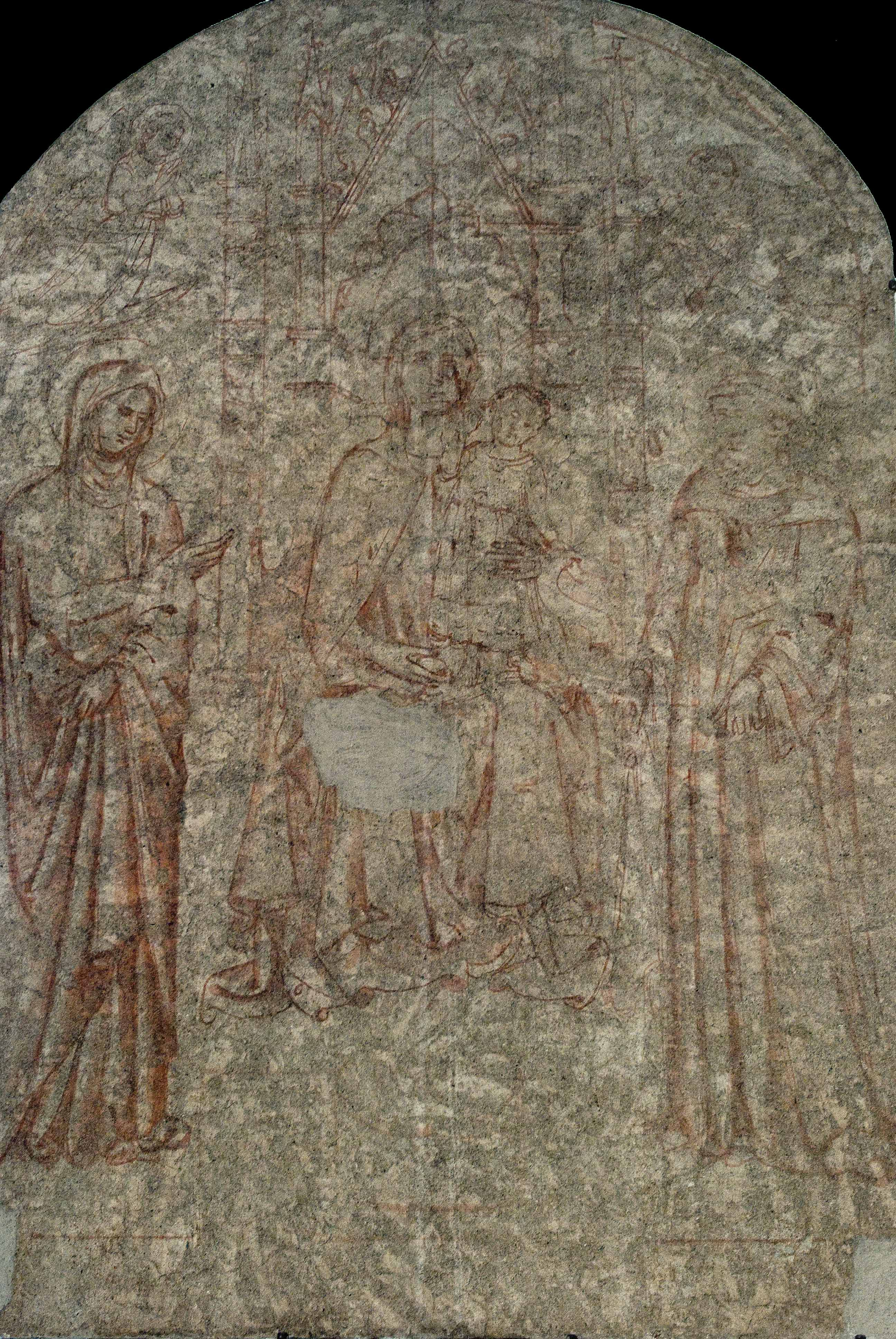
The sinopia—in this case, meaning the underpainting—of a painting of the Madonna and Child by Giovanni di Francesco Toscani

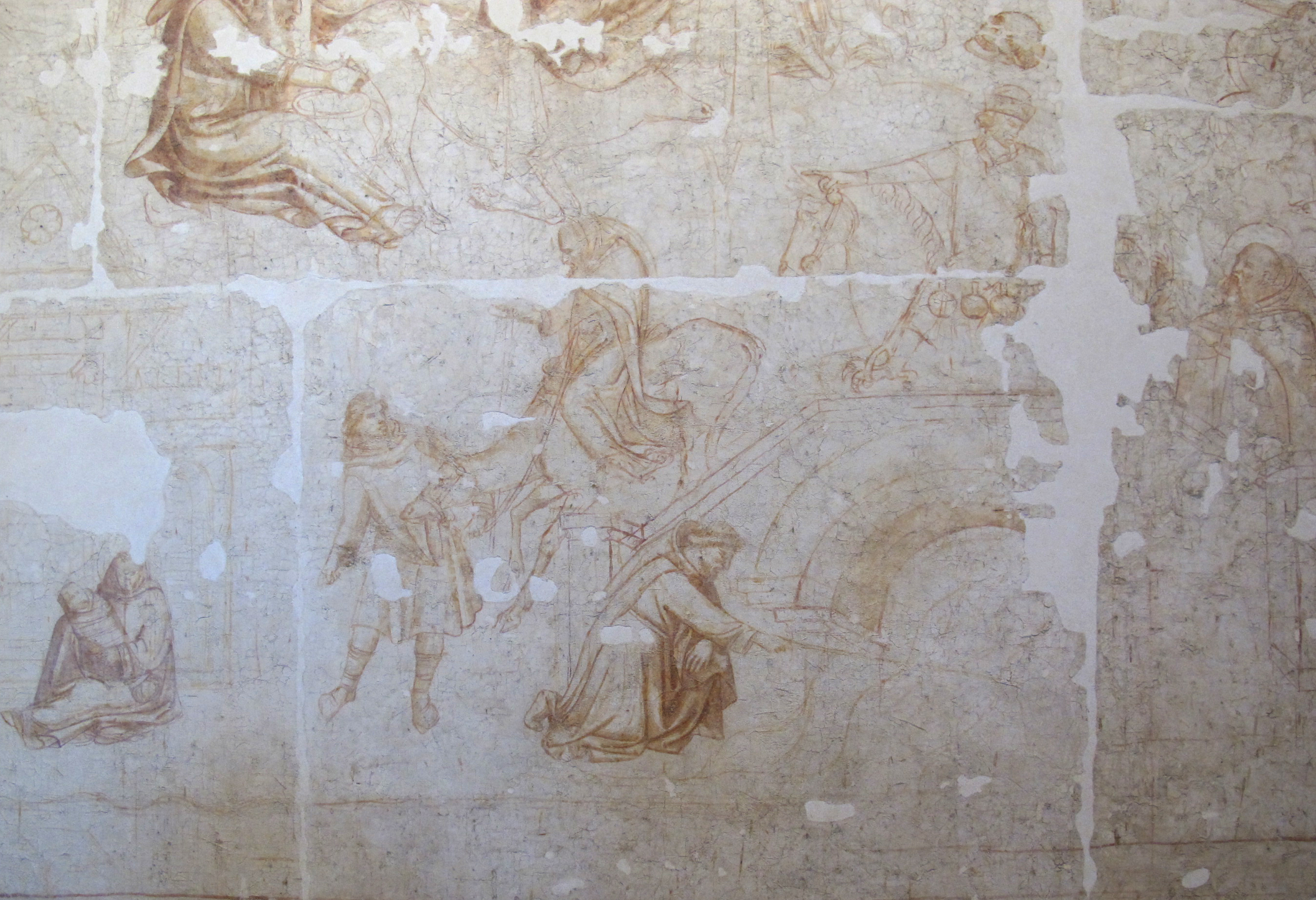
A sinopia for a fresco by Buonamico Buffalmacco (1290-1341), in the Museum of Sinopie in Pisa

Sinopia (also known as sinoper, named after the now Turkish city Sinop) is a dark reddish-brown natural earth pigment, whose reddish colour comes from hematite, a dehydrated form of iron oxide. It was widely used in Classical Antiquity and the Middle Ages for painting, and during the Renaissance it was often used on the rough initial layer of plaster for the underdrawing for a fresco. The word came to be used both for the pigment and for the preparatory drawing itself, which may be revealed when a fresco is stripped from its wall for transfer.

During the Middle Ages sinopia in Latin and Italian came to mean simply a red ochre. It entered the English language as the word sinoper, meaning a red earth colour.

Sinopia is a colour in various modern colour systems.

== Sinopia pigment ==
From Ancient times through the Renaissance, the pigment was mined in Cappadocia, and exported to Europe through the port of Sinop, a Greek colony on the Black Sea. The pigment was valued for its quality and the genuine product was marked with a seal to show its authenticity.

In the Renaissance "sinopia" or "sinoper" meant any of a range of different shades and hues, and the colour had a variety of names; it was sometimes called Venetian red, or Terra di Siena (Sienna earth), or Ocra rosso (red ochre). The colour shown in the box above is one more recent commercial variety of the colour.

The Italian painter and writer Cennino Cennini (c. 1370- c. 1440) described sinopia in his handbook on painting, "Il libro dell'arte", this way: "A natural pigment called sinoper, cinabrese or porphyry is red. This pigment has a lean and dry character. It responds well to milling, as the more it is pulverised the finer it becomes. It is good for working on panel or on anconas [a type of panel divided into smaller framed compartments], or walls, in fresco and in secco."

== Cinabrese and flesh tones ==
Cennino Cennini described a light red colour he called cinabrese, which was apparently a mixture of a light shade of sinopia and lime white; "And I do not know", Cennini wrote, "that they use this pigment outside Florence. And it is absolutely perfect for doing flesh or for making flesh colours for figures on walls. And work in fresco with it. This pigment is made from the loveliest and lightest sinopia that is found and is mixed and mulled with St. John's white, as it is called in Florence; and this white is made from thoroughly white and thoroughly purified lime...this pigment does you great credit if you use it for painting faces, hands and nudes on walls..."

== Sinopia as preparatory drawing of frescoes ==
Sinopia was often used in the Renaissance to make the preparatory drawing for frescoes directly onto the wall, on the levelling coat or on the arriccio. These drawings became known simply as sinopie, the plural word in Italian for the pigment. Many of these drawings have been discovered and restored, and are on display in the Museum of Sinopie (Museo delle Sinopie) in Pisa, next to the cathedral, baptistry and the leaning tower.

Cennino Cennini described in detail the process by which a sinopia was made and used. First, the artist covered a wall with a rough layer of lime plaster. When it dried, he made his first sketch in charcoal, blocking in the figures and scenes. Then he brushed off the charcoal, and using a small, pointed brush and ochre pigments "as thin as water" and without tempera, he painted in the figures in light shades. Then he used sinopia, also without tempera, to mark out the noses, the eyes, the hair, and the accents and outlines of all the figures in their correct proportions.

When the underdrawing was finished, the artist then applied a new thin layer of wet plaster, covering just enough area as he could work in one day. Before the plaster could dry, he filled in the colours into the plaster, following the visible lines of the sinopia.

To make the faces in the final fresco, Cennini recommended that the artist first paint them with an undercoat of brownish green, called a verdaccio. When that was dry, then he painted the flesh tones, made with ochre, lime white and a light red called cinabrese; then he painted the whites of the eyes and white highlights; then used black for the pupils of the eyes, the nostrils, openings in the ears and lines around the eyes, and then used a fine brush and sinopia to paint the lines under the eyes, around the nose, the eyebrows, the mouth and the shading under the upper lip.

== See also ==
- Underpainting
- List of colors
- List of inorganic pigments

== Bibliography ==
- Fabrizio F.V. Arrigoni: "Sinopie architettura ex artramentis". Lindlar 2011. Die Neue Sachlichkeit, ISBN 978-3-942139-07-6 (Deutsch/Italienisch); ISBN 978-3-942139-08-3 (English/Italian).
- Lara Broecke, Cennino cennini, Il libro dell'arte, (2015), Archetype, London (ISBN 978-1-909-49228-8)
- Daniel V. Thompson, The Materials and Techniques of Medieval Painting, (1956)' Dover Publications, New York (ISBN 0-486-20327-1)
- Cennino d'Andrea Cennini, The Craftsman's Handbook (Il Libro dell'Arte), (1933), translated by Daniel V. Thompson Jr., Dover Publications, (ISBN 978-0-486-20054-5)
