= Cooper Grant, Camden =

Populated place in Camden County, New Jersey, US

Cooper Grant
- Neighborhood of Camden
- Location in Camden County Location in New Jersey Location in the United States
- Coordinates: 39°56′52″N 75°7′36″W
- Country: United States
- State: New Jersey
- County: Camden
- City: Camden
- Elevation: 20 ft (6 m)
- Time zone: UTC−05:00 (Eastern (EST))
  - Summer (DST): UTC−04:00 (EDT)

Cooper Grant is a neighborhood located in the northwestern part of Camden, New Jersey. As of the 2000 census, the neighborhood has a population of 838. The neighborhood is situated near the Benjamin Franklin Bridge and Rutgers University–Camden. It is served by River LINE's Cooper Street–Rutgers University station. Cooper Grant is considered one of the city's contemporary residential success stories. It has a relatively low-crime rate and many residents are college-educated professionals and students.

== Historic district ==
- Cooper Grant Historic District
- U.S. National Register of Historic Places
- U.S. Historic district
- New Jersey Register of Historic Places
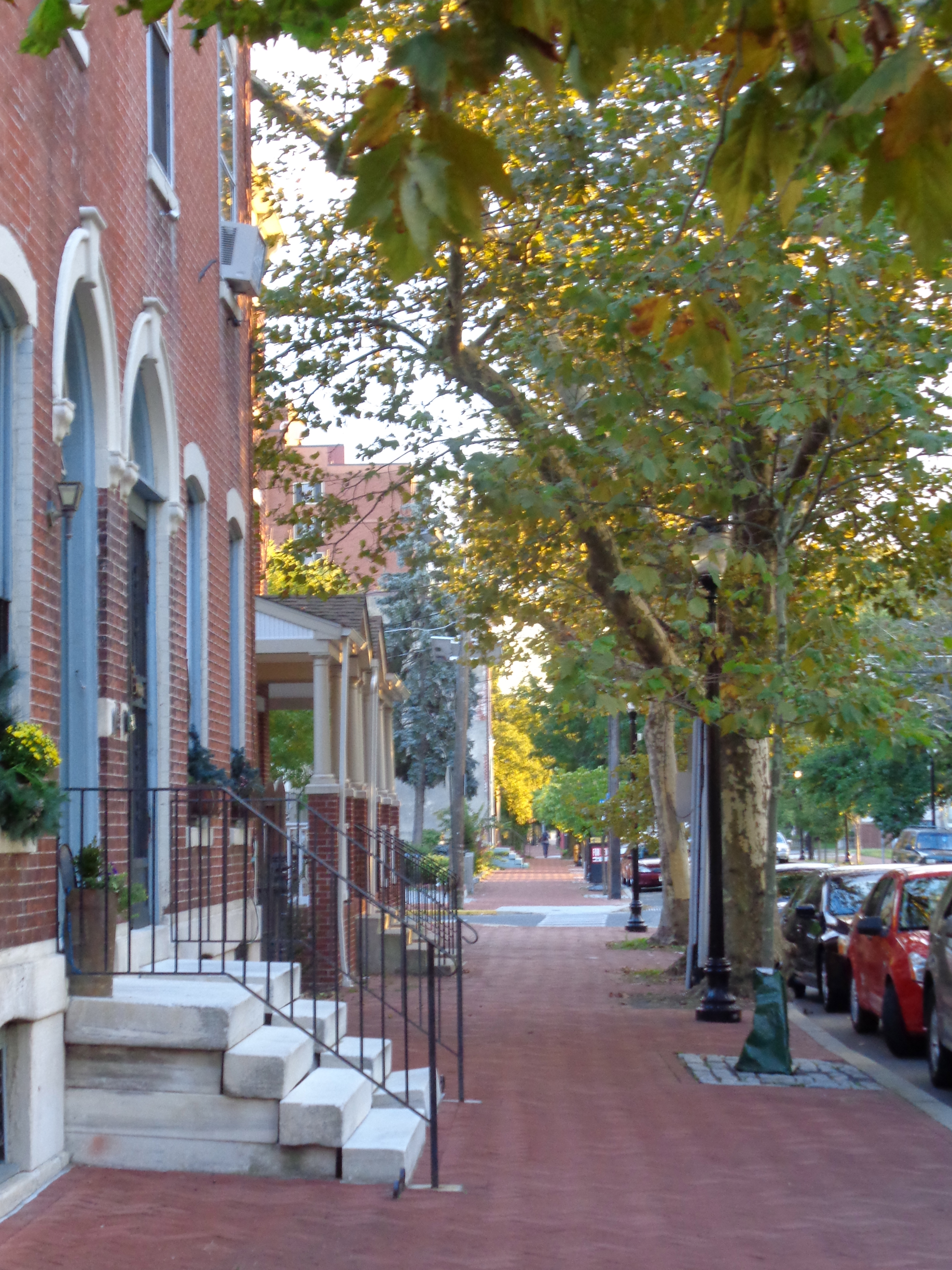
- The Cooper Grant section of Camden in September 2013
- Location: Roughly bounded by Friends, Linden, North Front, North Second, Penn, and Point; Camden, New Jersey
- Area: 25 acres (10 ha)
- Architectural style: Second Empire, Italianate, Gothic
- NRHP reference No.: 87002229
- NJRHP No.: 899

Significant dates
- Added to NRHP: January 1, 1989
- Designated NJRHP: October 7, 1987

The neighborhood is home to the Cooper Grant Historic District, which was added to the National Register of Historic Places on January 1, 1989, for its significance in architecture. It includes 93 contributing buildings, including the individually-listed Cooper Library in Johnson Park, spread over 25 acres.

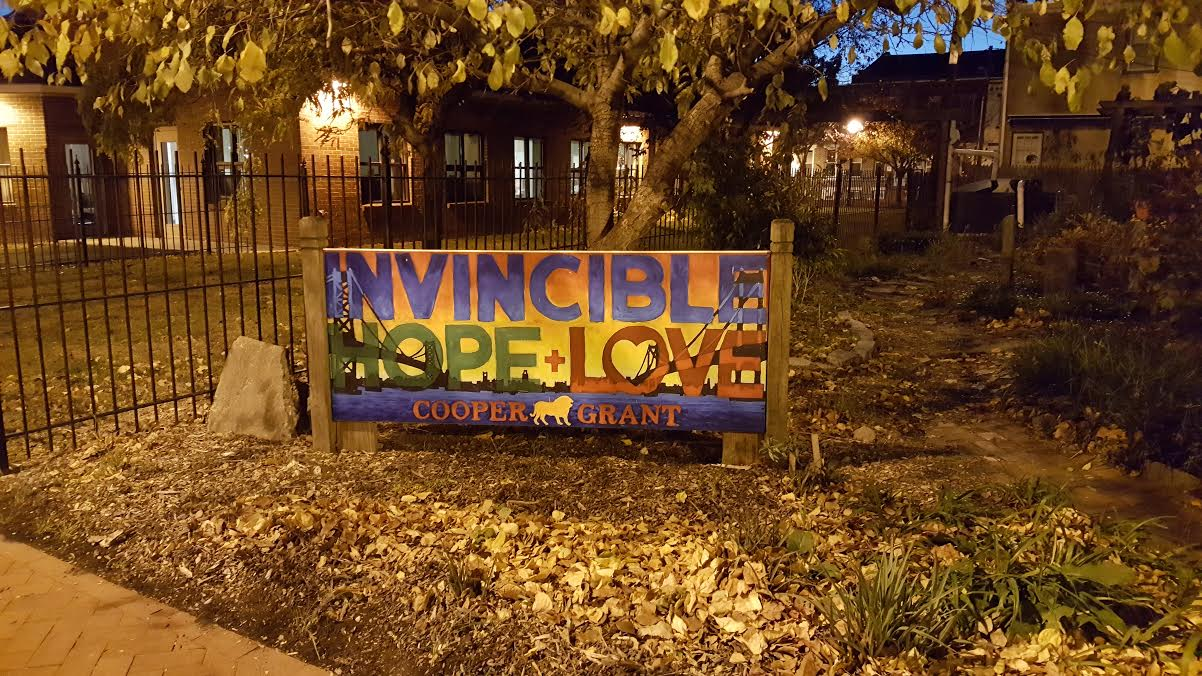
A community sign in the Cooper Grant section of Camden

== See also ==
- Campbell's Field
- Cooper Street Historic District
- National Register of Historic Places listings in Camden County, New Jersey
- Nipper Building
