= Intonaco =

Italian term for the final, very thin layer of plaster on which a fresco is painted

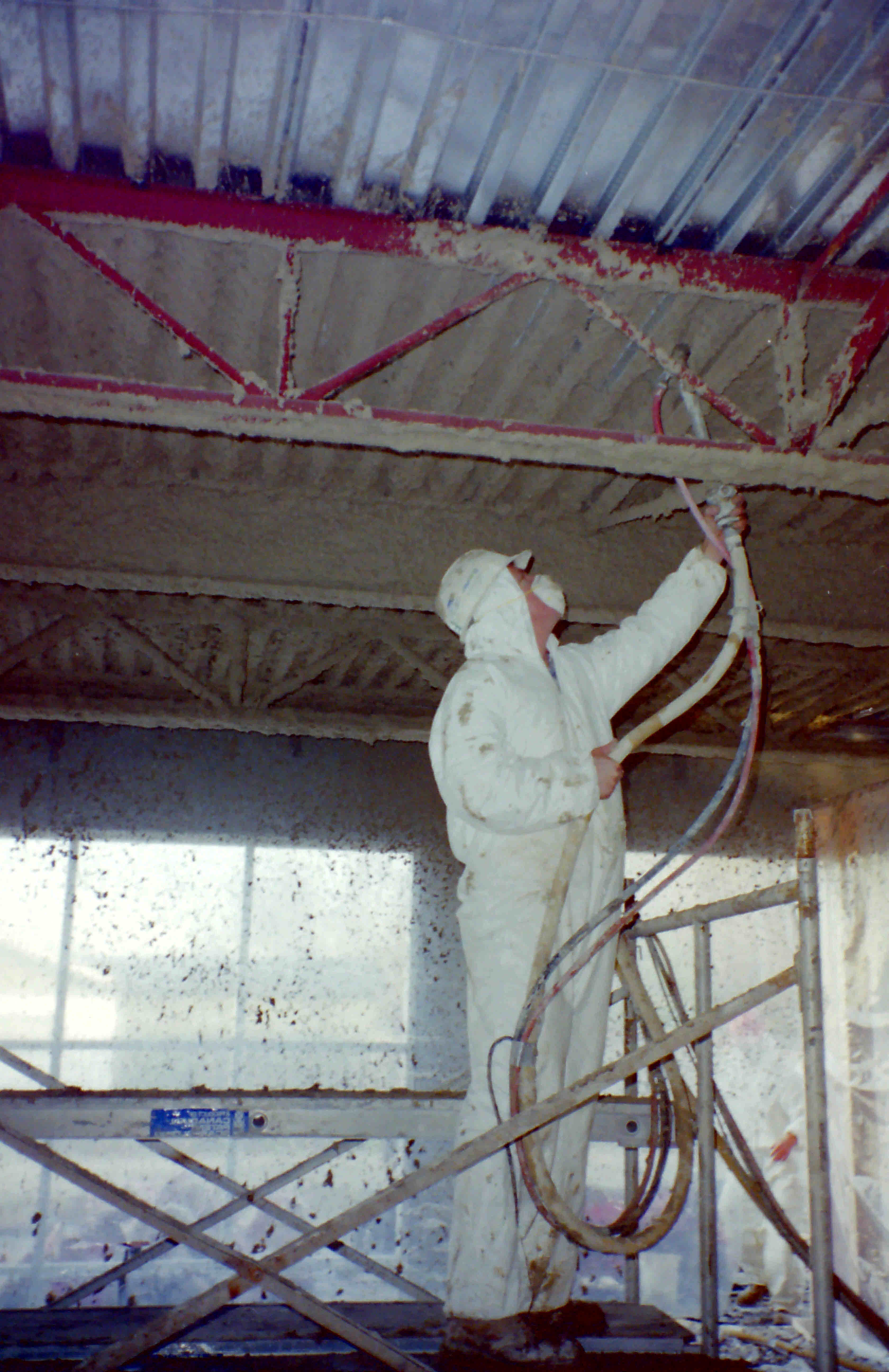
Example of spray fireproofing, using a gypsum based plaster in a low-rise industrial building in Vancouver, British Columbia.

Intonaco is an Italian term for the final, very thin layer of plaster on which a fresco is painted. The plaster is painted while still wet, in order to allow the pigment to penetrate into the intonaco itself. An earlier layer, called arriccio, is laid slightly coarsely to provide a key for the intonaco, and must be allowed to dry, usually for some days, before the final very thin layer is applied and painted on. In Italian the term intonaco is also used much more generally for normal plaster or mortar wall-coatings in buildings.

Intonaco is traditionally a mixture of sand (with granular dimensions less than two millimeters) and a binding substance.

== Types of intonaco ==
Different types of intonaco are classified based on the binding material used:

- Intonaco based on lime, where the only binding substance is hydrated lime
- Intonaco lime/cement, where the binding element is a mixture of hydrated lime with Portland cement, with a majority of lime
- Intonaco cement/lime, where the binding element is a mixture of hydrated lime, and Portland cement, with a majority of Portland cement
- Intonaco with a plaster base, where the binding element is exclusively plaster

The sand utilized in the intonaco can be limestone or silicate, taken from a natural source such as a river or from sand that is pulverized.

== Types of stabilizers ==
Intonaco can be stabilized using:

- Lime
- plaster
- Calcium-sulfate based plaster
- Terracotta-based cement
