= Camden, New Jersey =

City in Camden County, New Jersey, US

- City
- City of Camden
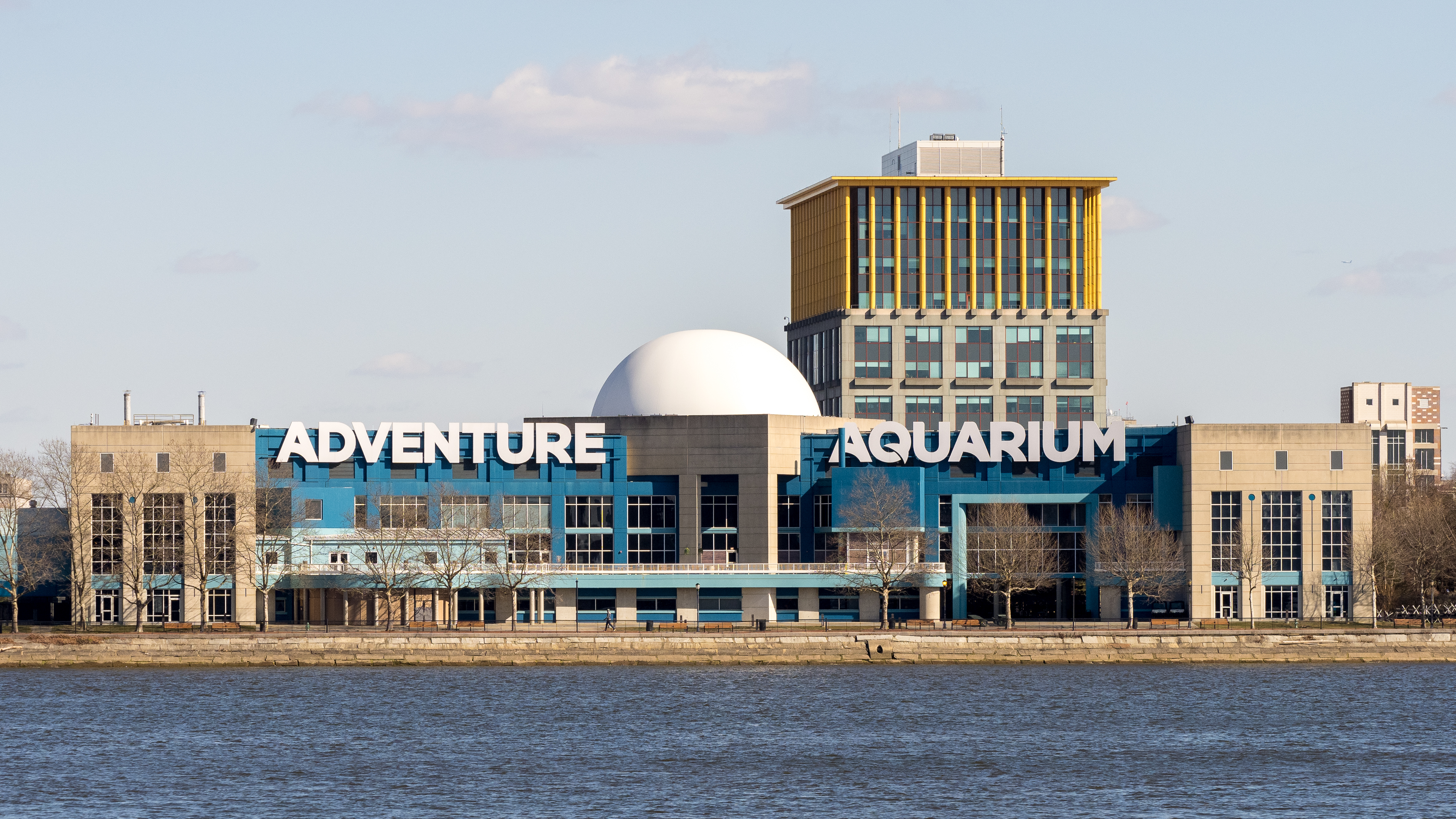
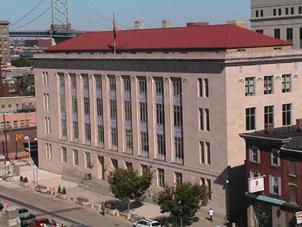
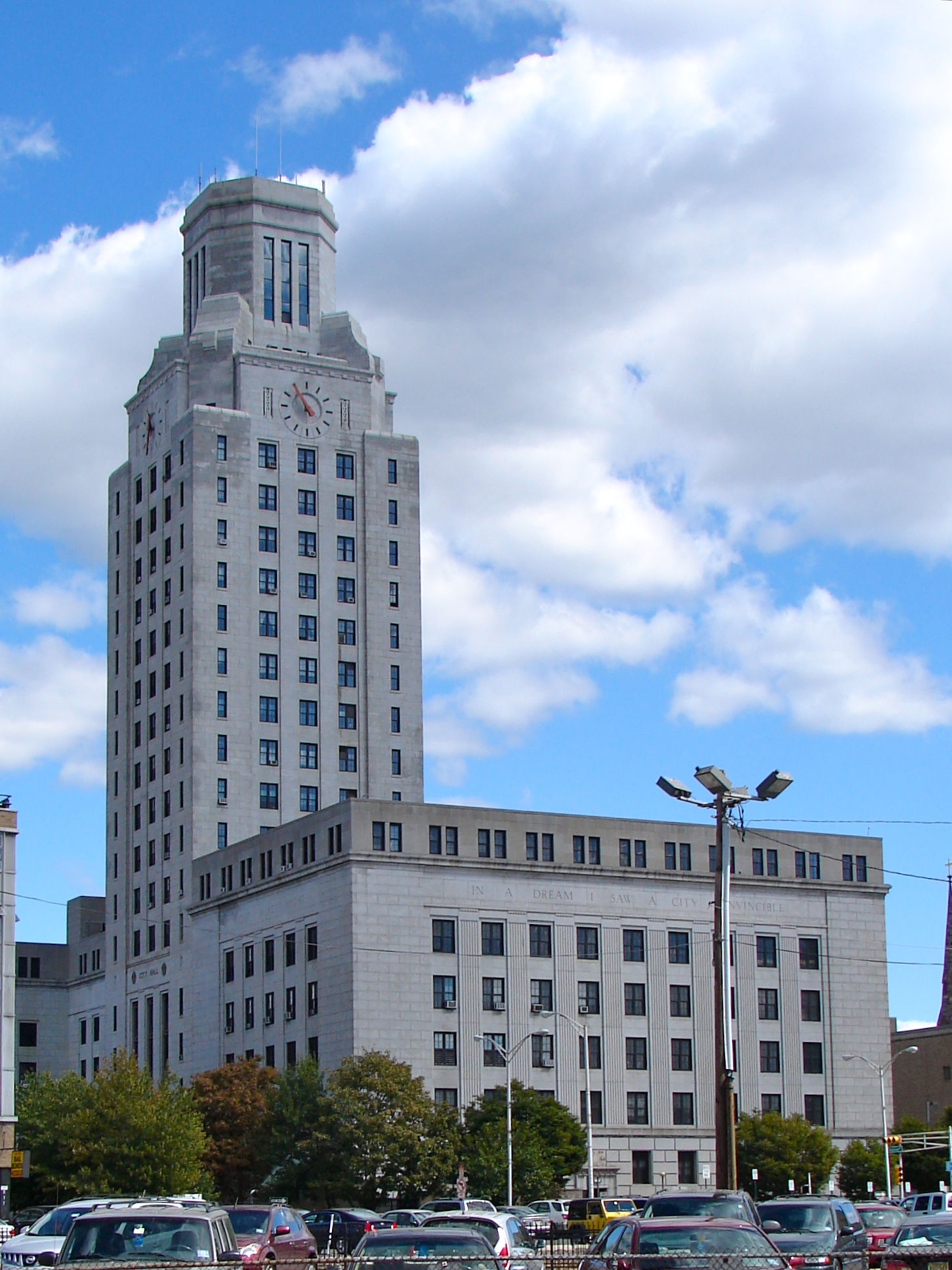
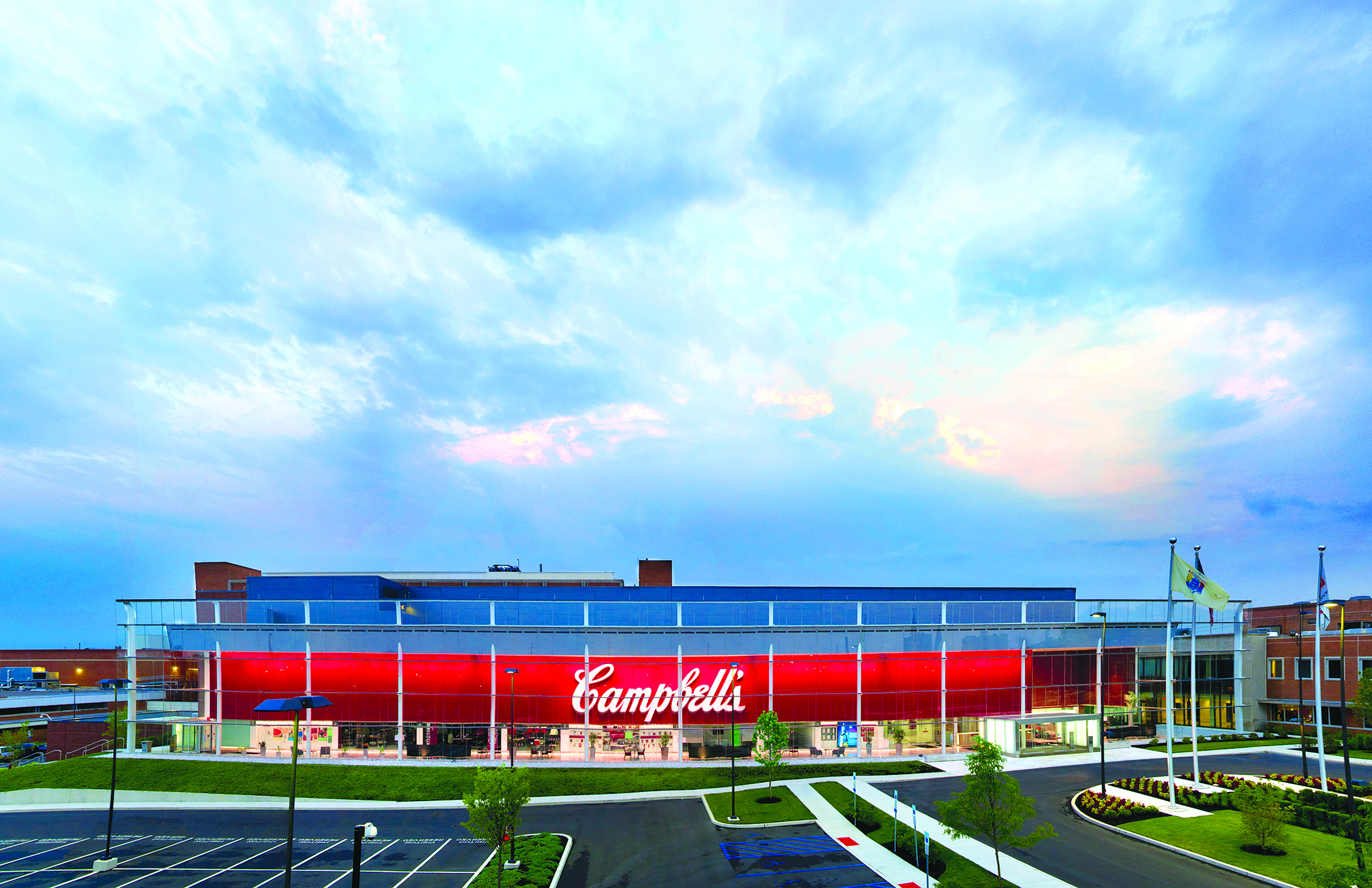
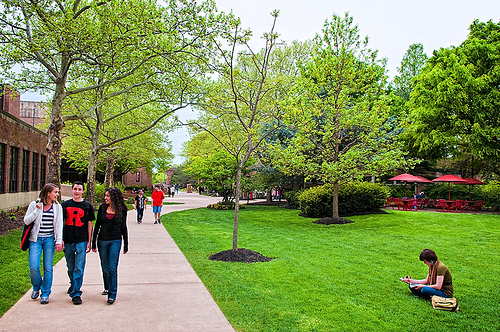
- Adventure Aquarium on the Camden Waterfront Camden Federal Courthouse Camden City Hall Campbell's headquarters Rutgers University–Camden

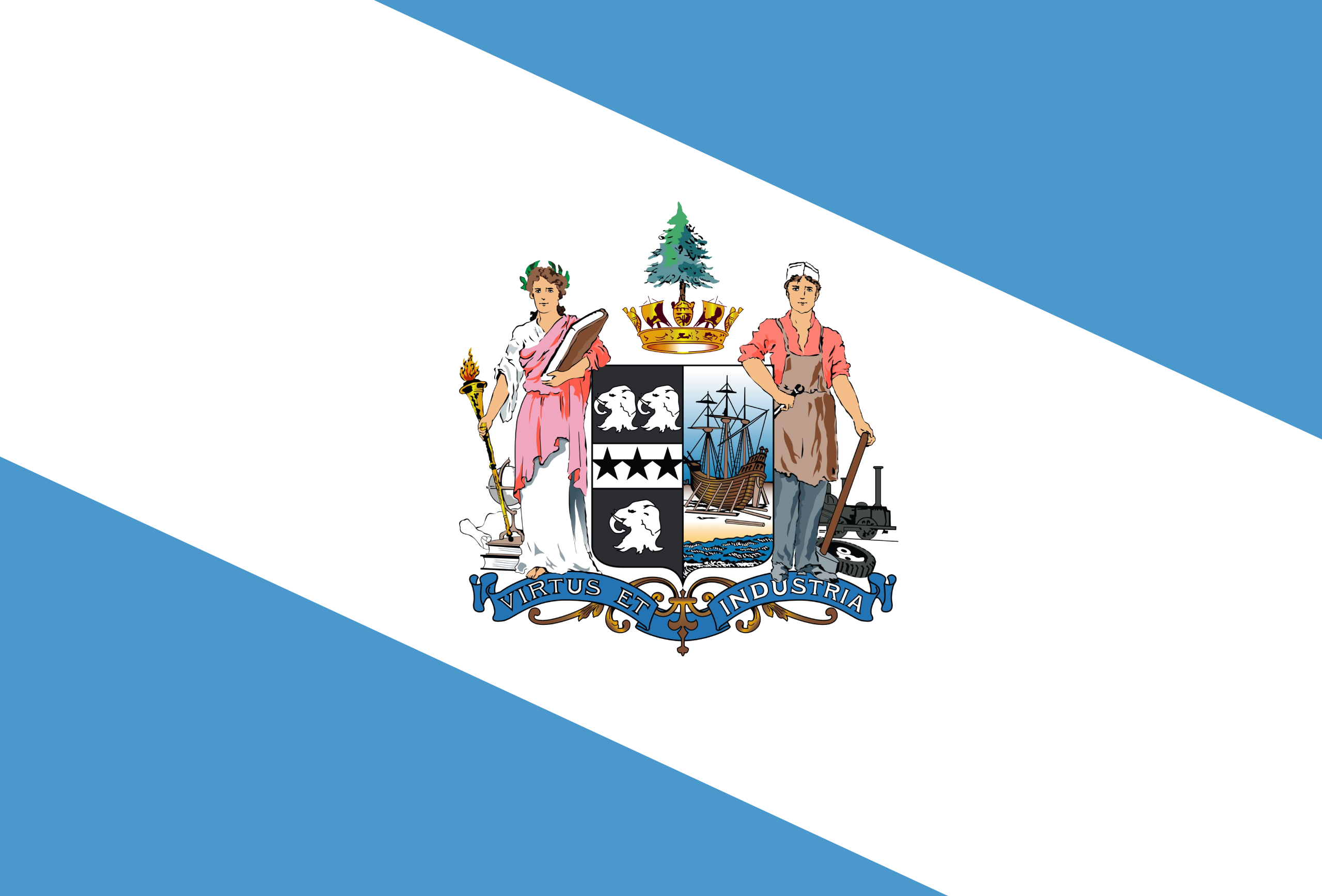
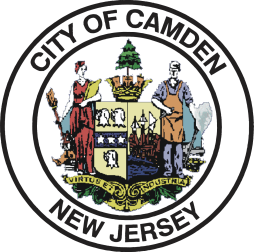
- Flag Seal
- Motto: In a Dream, I Saw a City Invincible
- Location of Camden in Camden County highlighted in red (right). Inset map: Location of Camden County in New Jersey highlighted in orange (left).

- Location in Camden County Location in New Jersey Location in the United States
- Coordinates: 39.94°N 75.105°W
- Country: United States
- State: New Jersey
- County: Camden
- Settled: 1626
- Incorporated: February 13, 1828
- Named for: Charles Pratt, 1st Earl Camden

Government
  - Type: Faulkner Act (mayor–council)
  - Body: City Council
  - Mayor: Victor Carstarphen (D, term ends December 31, 2029)
  - Administrator: Timothy J. Cunningham
  - Municipal clerk: Luis Pastoriza

Area
  - Total: 10.34 sq mi (26.78 km^{2})
  - Land: 8.92 sq mi (23.10 km^{2})
  - Water: 1.42 sq mi (3.68 km^{2}) 13.75%
  - Rank: 208th of 565 in state 7th of 37 in county
- Elevation: 16 ft (5 m)

Population (2020)
  - Total: 71,791
  - Estimate (2024): 71,749
  - Rank: 532nd in country (as of 2023); 14th of 565 in state 2nd of 37 in county
  - Density: 8,047.4/sq mi (3,107.1/km^{2})
  - Rank: 50th of 565 in state 2nd of 37 in county
- Time zone: UTC−05:00 (Eastern (EST))
  - Summer (DST): UTC−04:00 (Eastern (EDT))
- ZIP Codes: 08101–08105
- Area code: 856
- FIPS code: 3400710000
- GNIS feature ID: 0885177
- Website: camdennj.gov

Camden is a city in and the county seat of Camden County, New Jersey, United States. Located across the Delaware River from Philadelphia, Pennsylvania, it is part of the Philadelphia metropolitan area. The population was 71,791 at the 2020 census. The city was incorporated on February 13, 1828. Camden has been the county seat of Camden County since the county's formation on March 13, 1844. The city derives its name from Charles Pratt, 1st Earl Camden. Camden is made up of over 20 neighborhoods, and is part of the South Jersey region of the state.

The initial growth of Camden industrially is often credited to the "big three" employers: RCA Victor, Campbell's Soup Company and New York Shipbuilding Corporation. The "big three" felt compelled to move away from Camden in the mid-to-late-20th century as they could find cheaper workers elsewhere. Though the city has declined in recent decades since the decline of heavy industry in the area and white flight to the suburbs, the city has made efforts to revitalize itself through various infrastructure and community projects.

Projects such as the redevelopment of the waterfront area brought three tourist attractions to the area: the Battleship New Jersey Museum and Memorial, the Freedom Mortgage Pavilion and the Adventure Aquarium. The city is the home of Rutgers University–Camden, which was founded as the South Jersey Law School in 1926, and Cooper Medical School of Rowan University, which opened in 2012. Camden also houses both Cooper University Hospital and Virtua Our Lady of Lourdes Hospital. Camden County College and Rowan University also have campuses in downtown Camden. The "eds and meds" institutions account for roughly 45% of Camden's total employment. Completed in 1931 and standing 18 stories and 371 feet (113 m) in height, Camden City Hall is the tallest building in Camden.

Once known for violent crime, the restructuring of the police force in 2013 has been credited for its decline. As of January 2021, violent crime was down 46% from its high in the 1990s and at the lowest level since the 1960s. Overall crime reports in 2020 were down 74% compared to 1974, the first year of uniform crime-reporting in the city. In 2025, Camden recorded its first summer without a homicide in 50 years.

== History ==
=== Prehistory ===
The city traces back to local indigenous Lenape, who are believed to have inhabited this area 13–15,000 years prior to the first European settlers.

=== Settlement years (1623–1701) ===
Between 1623 and 1627, Captain Cornelius Jacobsen May, an officer with the Dutch West India Company and first director of New Netherland, established Fort Nassau, where the Delaware River meets Big Timber Creek, which is today known as Brooklawn. In 1633, David Pietersen De Vries, a Dutch commander, was sailing up the Delaware River when he came across Natives in control of the fort. The settlers that had been left at the fort had decided to return to New Amsterdam (Today Manhattan, New York). Wouter van Twiller, Governor of New Netherland, restored Fort Nassau. He was accused of extravagant spending in the fort's reconstruction. The settlement subsequently sparked competition from European Settlers over control of the fur trade in the area. The fort was used by the Dutch until around 1650 or 1651 when it was decided that it was too far up the river to be of any value. The buildings and stockades were demolished and Wouter van Twiller assigned Arent Corssen to find a place for another fort.

The British first had a presence in the area in 1634. On June 21, 1634, Sir Edmund Ployden was given a charter from King Charles I of England for all territory that lies between New England and Maryland. After the Restoration in 1660, previous claims were largely overwritten, the land around Camden was then controlled by different nobles serving under King Charles II that those associated with Sir Edmund Ployden.

In 1664, the Duke of York had the King Charles II create the new colony for Lord John Berkeley and Sir George Carteret. It was named the Province of New Jersey after George Carteret; in 1649, he was Governor of the Isle of Jersey. Lord John Berkeley kept his share of New Jersey from 1664 until 1674, when he sold it to two Quakers, John Fenwick and Edward Byllynge. This due to political difficulties between him, Carteret, and Governor of New York Richard Nicolls, as well as financial difficulties. Governor Richard Nicolls had objected to the Province of New Jersey as he had exercised control over the area prior under the Province of New York. After Edward Byllynge suffered a bankruptcy and having issues with his creditors, William Penn, one of the creditors, was chosen to be arbitrator. They argued that he funded the purchase of Lord John Berkeley's share of the Province of New Jersey with funds that were justly due to them. It was decided that Fenwick was entitled to 10% of the share, while 90% would be controlled by trustees that are chosen for the benefit of the creditors of Edward Byllynge, who were mostly Quakers themselves. The trustees were chosen to be William Penn, Gawen Laurie and Nicholas Lucas. The goal was to have the trustees sell the territory to colonists so that the creditors of Edward Byllynge would be made whole. It was also hoped that Quaker may be motivated to emigrate to this territory. At the time, the Society of Friends were flirting with the idea of "new country", where they could practice their religious beliefs and not be shamelessly persecuted. In 1676, the Quakers decided to form a colony, spittling the previous colony in two, East Jersey and West Jersey for the Quakers. Quakers settled in the area at the end of the 17th century and the start of the 18th century, drawn by promises of religious freedom, fairer taxation and more representation in government.

=== Colonial (1702–1775) ===
The Quakers expansion, consumption of resources, along with the introduction of alcohol and disease, led to a decline in the Lenape population. The development of a ferry system along the Delaware River bolstered trade between Fort Nassau and Philadelphia. Through ferries, families like Coopers and the Kaighns were able to establish settlements in surrounding areas. In 1773, Jacob Cooper played a significant role in developing the area which is today known as Camden, named after Charles Pratt, the Earl of Camden.

=== Post-colonial (1776–1827) ===
Throughout the Revolutionary War, there were several skrimishes and other effects of the war felt by locals. Development was impeded for the village due to the revolution, as Camden was held by the British along with Philadelphia across the Delaware River.

=== Founding and early years (1828–1890) ===
In the 19th century Camden underwent significant changes, transitioning from a hub of transportation to a growing city. Camden was incorporated as a city on February 13, 1828, from portions of Newton Township, while the area was still part of Gloucester County. In 1832, Camden Township was created as a township coextensive with Camden City. The township existed until it was repealed in 1848. Camden Township was established in 1832 which was the same area as Camden City until it was reduced in 1848. In 1830, the Camden and Amboy Railroad Company was chartered in Camden, which connected ferry terminals from New York City to Philadelphia via rail. The railroad ended in Camden's Waterfront, where passengers would be ferried across the Delaware River to arrive in Philadelphia. Similarly to Camden's inception, transportation was a huge catalyst in its growth—the railroads opening in 1834 led to an increase in population and commerce.

=== Industrial growth (1891–1950) ===
At the turn 20th Century, industry grew rapidly at the hands of companies such as the Victor Talking Machine Company (later RCA Victor), Campbell's and the New York Shipbuilding Corporation. These were major employers in Camden, at times employing tens of thousands in and outside of Camden. Its location on the Delaware River made it ideal to launch ships.

Camden also experienced dramatic shifts in its population demographic. Immigration from Eastern Europe made them the leading ethnic group by 1920, whereas it had previously been German, British, and Irish immigrants. In 1926, a bridge connecting New Jersey and Pennsylvania opened, which was formally named the Benjamin Franklin Bridge in 1956. The project cost $37 million (equivalent to $673 million in 2025), split evenly between New Jersey and Pennsylvania. The goal was to reduce ferry traffic between Philadelphia and Camden.

Camden Central Airport opened in 1929 and was used by several major airlines until Philadelphia International Airport opened in 1939 and brought air service across the Delaware River. The airport officially closed in April 1957, with a shopping center to be constructed on the 50-acre (20 ha) site.

During the 1930s, Camden faced economic decline in the face of the Great Depression. It was due to Camden's thriving industry that they did not go bankrupt. The United States role in World War II made the New York Shipbuilding Company the largest and most productive ship yard in the world. World War II caused African American migration in and around Camden from the south as there was a need for factory workers for the war effort. Subsequently, Camden became ethnically and religiously segregated. On July 17, 1951, the Delaware River Port Authority, a bi-state agency, was created to promote trade and better coordinate transportation between the two cities of Camden and Philadelphia.

=== Industrial decline (1951–1991) ===
However, by the 1950s, manufacturing began to slow, causing industries to relocate and employment to dwindle. In contrast to the growth and industrialization Camden experienced in the early 1900s, there came a drop in population and industry further into the 20th century. Having reached its peak number of manufacturing jobs in 1950, by 1982 it was a quarter of what it had been. After World War II, Campbell's Soup Company and RCA Victor decentralized their production efforts in Camden. This Capital Flight was an attempt to avoid an increase in labor wages which unionized workers were fighting for. The New York Shipbuilding Company, a major contributor of naval units during World War II, shut down in 1967 due to low demand and mismanagement.

During this period there was a large amount of white flight, in which white residents moved to surrounding suburbs in search of safety and economic opportunity. Neighborhoods were further divided by the construction of the North-South Freeway; 1,289 families were displaced by the highway, 85% of which were nonwhite families. Along with this, civil unrest grew resulting in riots. Police brutality and crime were at an all-time high which further exacerbated Camden's problems.

=== Revitalization (1992–present) ===
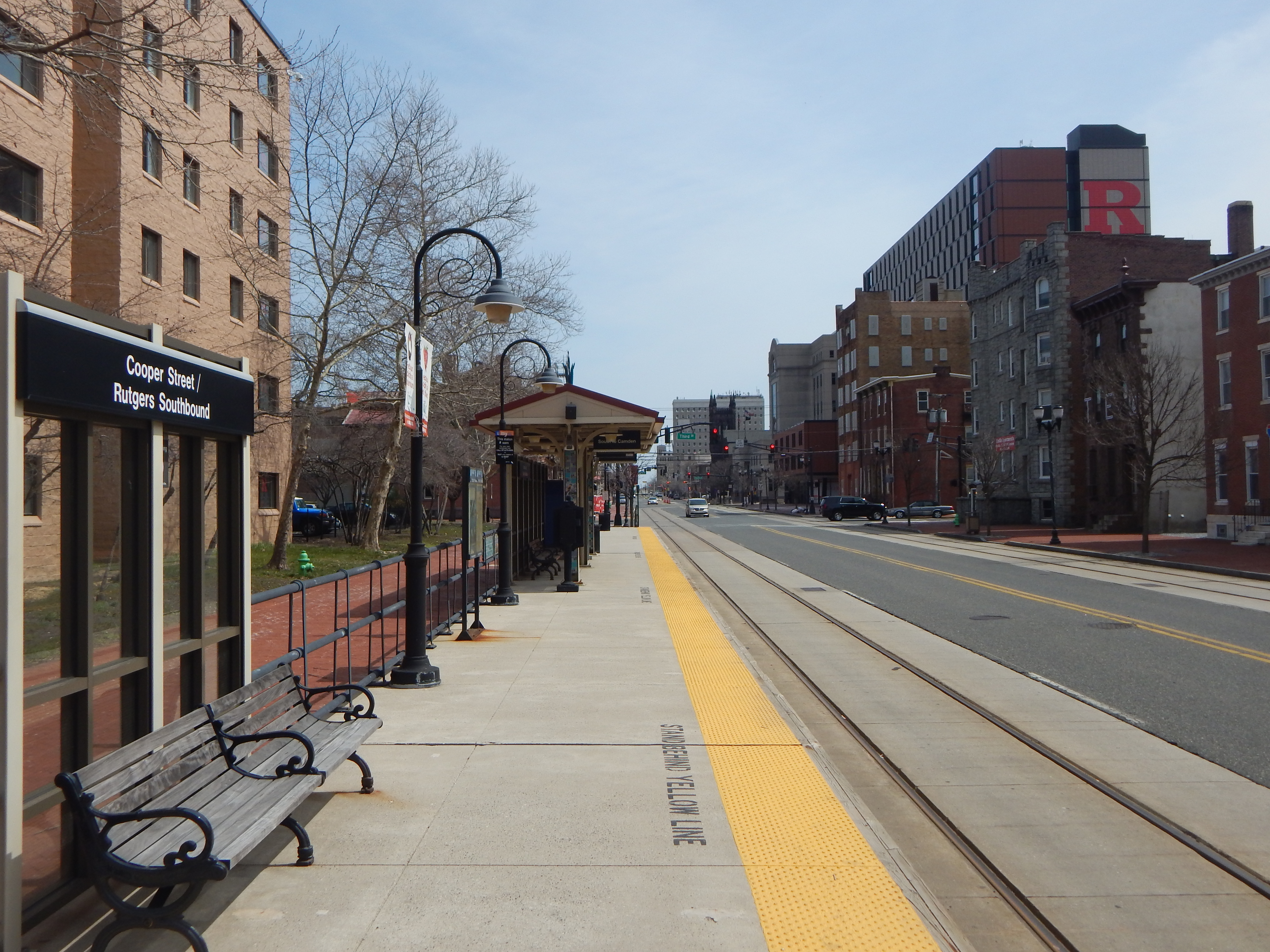
The River Line's Cooper Street–Rutgers University station stop

Efforts to revitalize Camden began in 1980 with Mayor Randy Primas. In an attempt to generate income for the city, he pursued initiatives such as the construction of a riverfront state-prison and a trash-to-steam incinerator which received substantial opposition from residents. With the election of Milton Milan as Camden's next mayor, he declared the city bankrupt, which resulted in $60 million of aid and the state's assumption of Camden's finances. Another notable revitalization effort was the establishment of non-profit organization, The Parkside Business and Community In Partnership, which occurred in 1993 and is active today.

==== Redevelopment ====
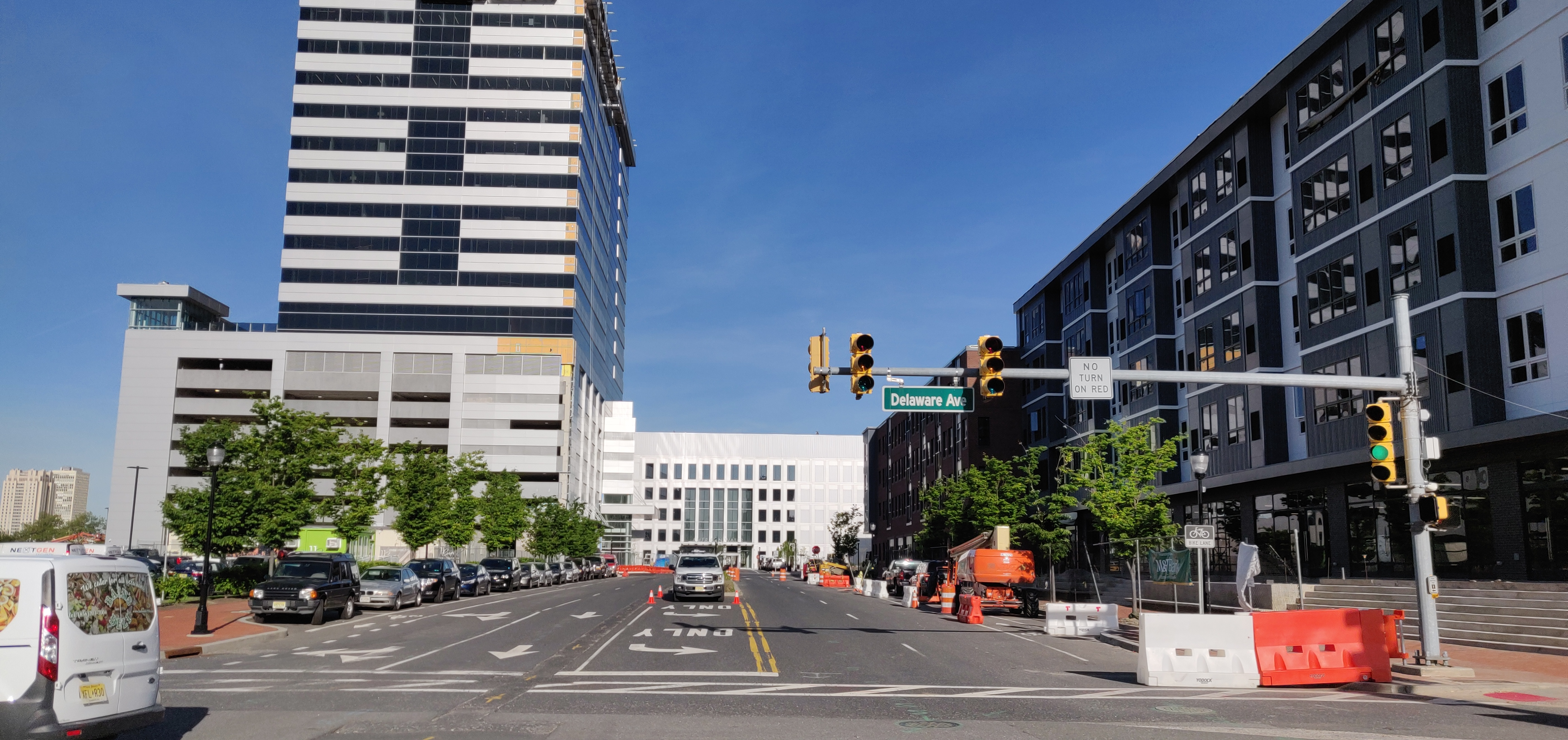
Camden Towers (left), American Water Headquarters (center), and 11 Cooper St Apartments (right) in Camden

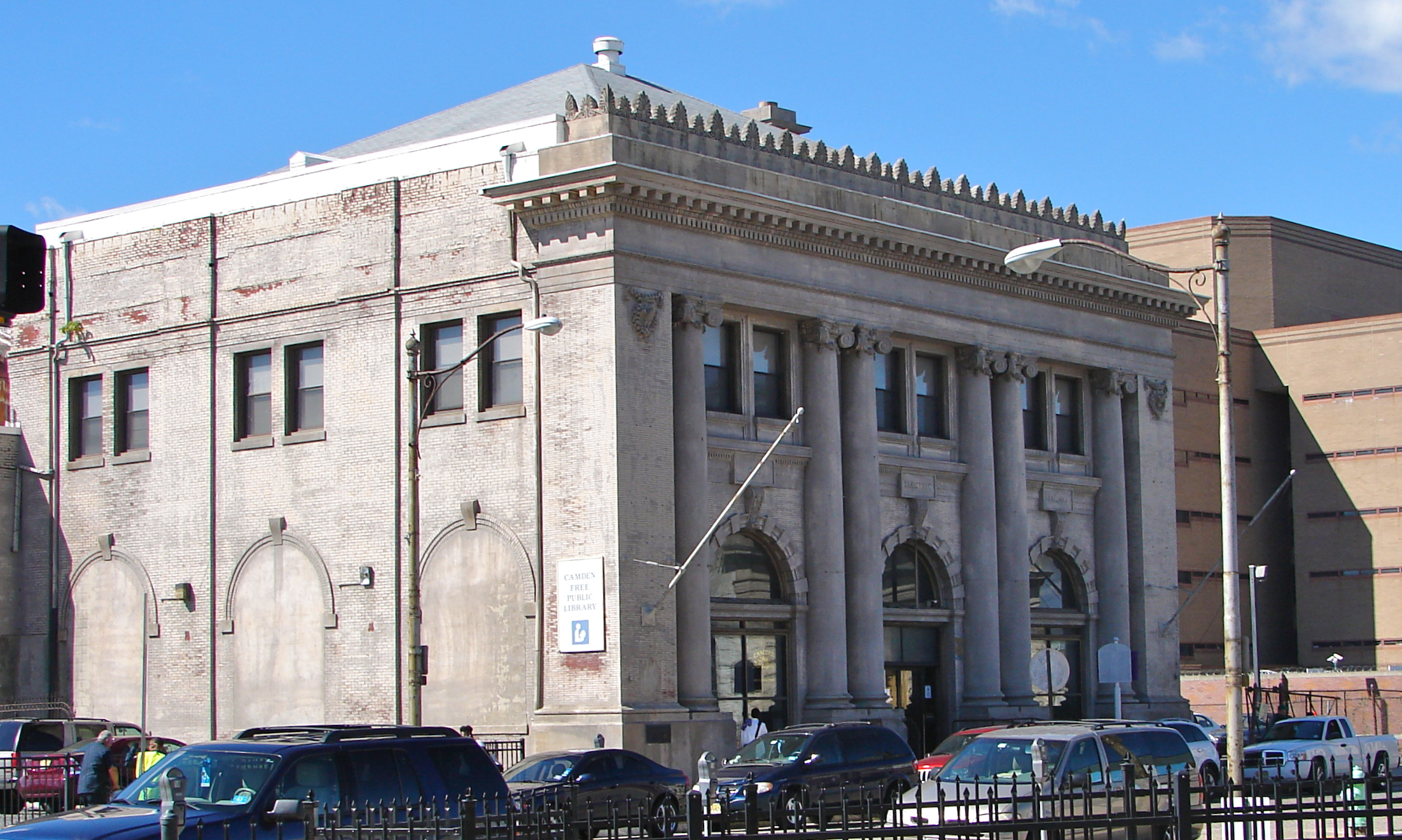
The former Camden Downtown Branch of the Camden County Library

Redevelopment as an idea has loomed over the city since the 1980s, when Mayor Primas started looking for projects to be able to revitalize with the loss of several foundational industries in the preciding decades. In 2013 the New Jersey Economic Development Authority introduced incentives for companies to relocate to Camden. Other projects include the redevelopment of the Waterfront, the construction of the Philadelphia 76ers Training Complex, and the Subaru of America's headquarters.

==== 2020s ====
In recent years, Camden has transitioned from a manufacturing industry to an economy focused on education and healthcare. The Eds-and-Meds Industry has become the largest source of employment in Camden—with institutions such as Cooper University Hospital, Rowan University, Rutgers-Camden, Camden County College, Virtua, Our Lady of Lourdes Medical Center, and CAMcare. In October 2025, the New Jersey Economic Development Authority (NJDEA) issued a Request for Expressions of Interest (RFEOI) to solicit development proposals of 16 acres along the North Camden waterfront on the site of the former prison, which had been demolished in 2009, as well as part of the Weeks Marine site; enacting on a redevelopment place in place since 2014.

== Culture ==
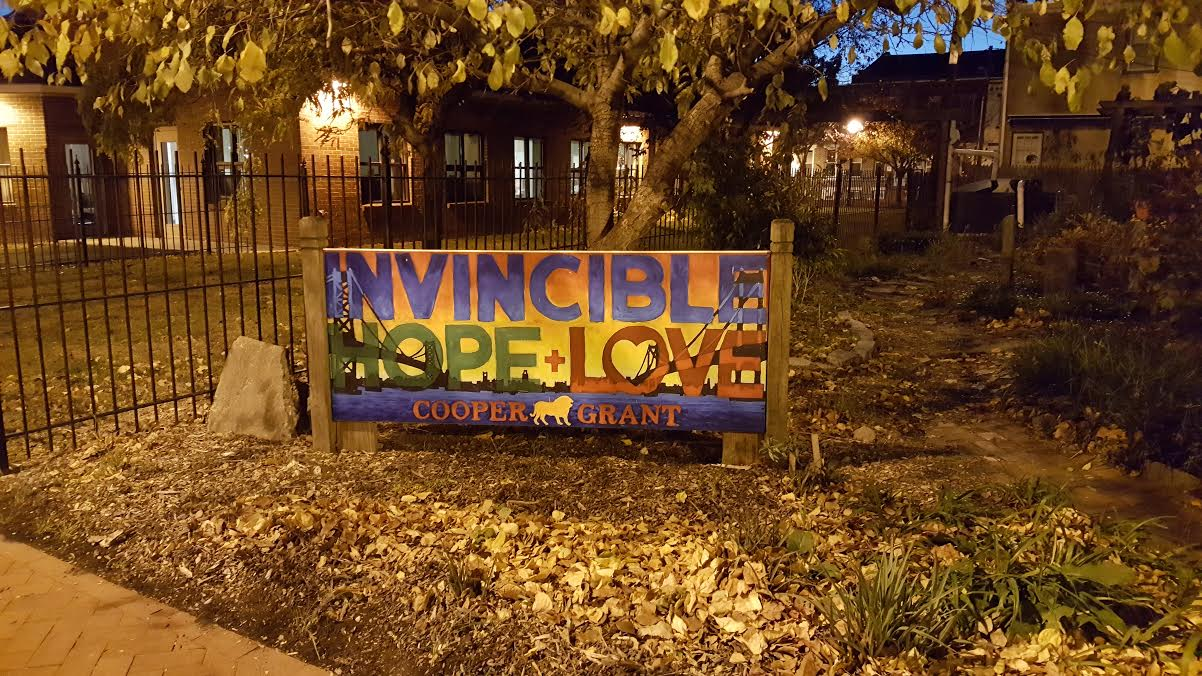
"A City Invincible" sign, the city's official tagline, near Camden's Cooper Grant neighborhood

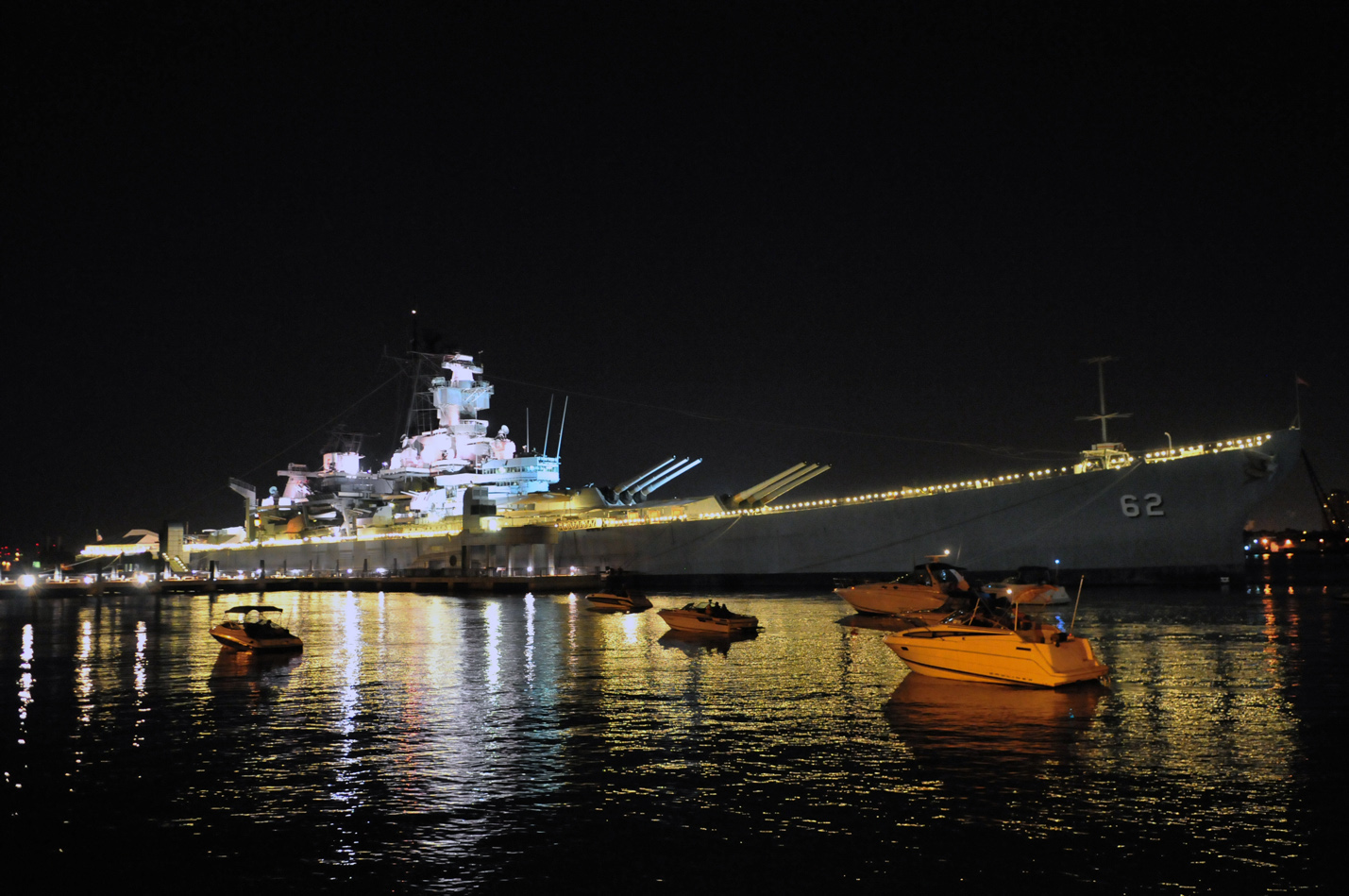
The Battleship USS New Jersey on the Camden waterfront in 2010

Camden's role as an industrial city gave rise to distinct neighborhoods and cultural groups that have affected the growth and decline of the city over the course of the 20th century. Camden is also home to historic landmarks detailing its rich history in literature, music, social work and industry such as the Walt Whitman House, the Walt Whitman Cultural Arts Center, the Rutgers–Camden Center for the Arts and the Camden Children's Garden. Others include the Camden County Historical Society, which document the city and surrounding area's history. It was built in 1899 as a place for those who find anything that links to one's heritage and for other educational purposes.

Camden's cultural history has been greatly affected by both its economic and social position over the years. From 1950 to 1970, industry plummeted, resulting in close to 20,000 jobs being lost for Camden residents. This mass unemployment as well as social pressure from neighboring townships caused an exodus of citizens, mostly white. This gap was filled by new African American and Latino citizens and led to a restructuring of Camden's communities. The number of White citizens who left to neighboring towns such as Collingswood or Cherry Hill left both new and old African American and Latino citizens to re-shape their community. To help in this process, numerous not-for-profit organizations such as Hopeworks or the Neighborhood Center were formed to facilitate Camden's movement into the 21st century.

=== Community ===
The Black Community has been one of the city's foundations since its founding in 1828 and have contributed heavily to the city's culture. Corinne's Place is a Black-owned soul food restaurant located in Camden, New Jersey. Corinne Bradley-Powers opened the restaurant on Haddon Avenue in 1989. The Hispanic and Latino Community in the city has increased heavily in the past twenty years, but have had a long history in Camden. Puerto Rican Unity for Progress is a multi-service, community-based organization that is located in Camden and serves the Hispanic community who reside in the city. The organization was established in 1976 and opened its physical location at 437 Broadway Street in Camden in June 1978.

=== Arts and entertainment ===
The Arts and Entertainment have always been present in the city. In the early 20th century, Camden became a hub of music and innovation in entertainment with the presence of the Victor Talking Machine Company (later RCA Victor). It is the birthplace of celebrities such as singers Russ Columbo and Lola Falana. Today, Camden is home to individuals and groups that help bolster the arts in the city.

=== Religion ===
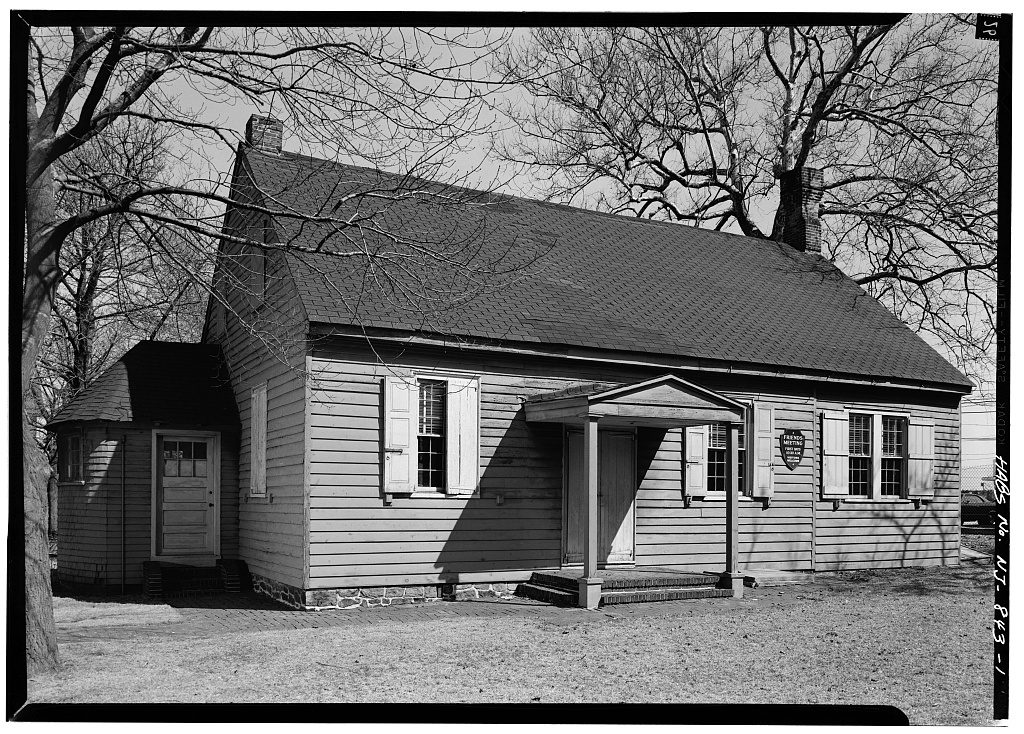
Newton Monthly Meeting of the Religious Society of Friends

Camden has religious institutions including many churches and their associated non-profit organizations and community centers such as the Little Rock Baptist Church in the Parkside section of Camden, First Nazarene Baptist Church, Kaighn Avenue Baptist Church, and the Parkside United Methodist Church. Other congregations that are active now are Newton Monthly Meeting of the Religious Society of Friends on Haddon Avenue and Cooper Street and the Masjid on Mechanic Street.

The first Scientology church was incorporated in December 1953 in Camden by L. Ron Hubbard, his wife Mary Sue Hubbard, and John Galusha.

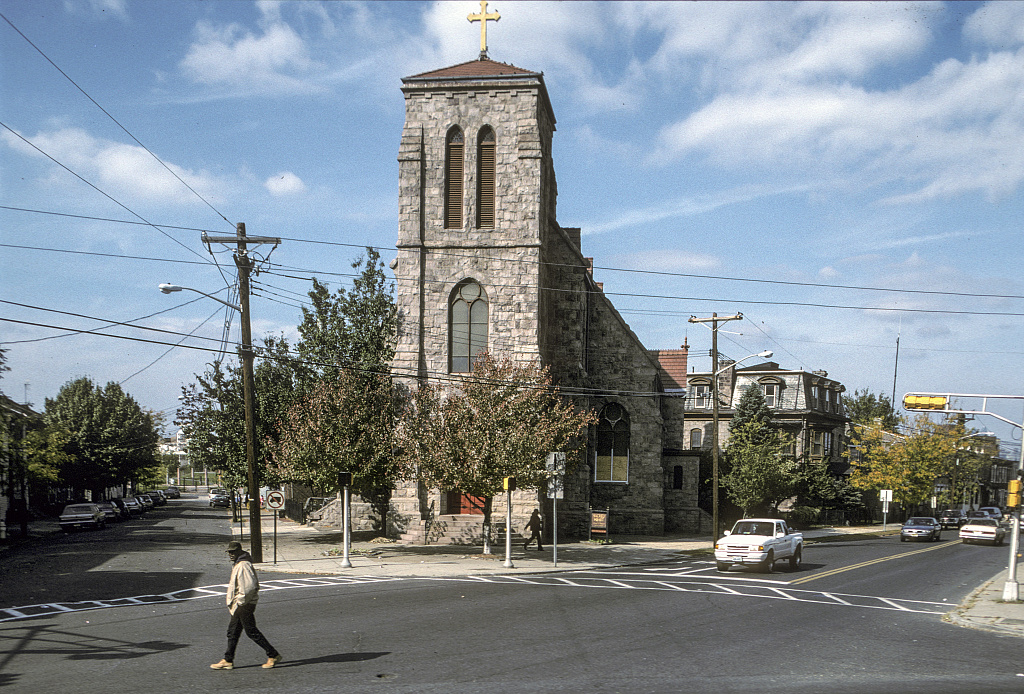
Sacred Heart Catholic Church on Broadway and Ferry Ave in Camden

Father Michael Doyle, the pastor of Sacred Heart Catholic Church located in South Camden, has played a large role in Camden's spiritual and social history. In 1971, Doyle was part of the Camden 28, a group of anti-Vietnam War activists who planned to raid a draft board office in the city. This is noted by many as the start of Doyle's activities as a radical 'Catholic Left'. Following these activities, Monsignor Doyle went on to become the pastor of Sacred Heart Church, remaining known for his poetry and activism. Monsignor Doyle and the Sacred Heart Church's main mission is to form a connection between the primarily white suburban surrounding areas and the inner-city of Camden.

In 1982, Father Mark Aita of Holy Name of Camden founded the St. Luke's Catholic Medical Services. Aita, a medical doctor and a member of the Society of Jesus, created the first medical system in Camden that did not use rotating primary care physicians. Since its conception, St. Luke's has grown to include Patient Education Classes as well as home medical services, aiding over seven thousand Camden residents.

=== Philanthropy ===
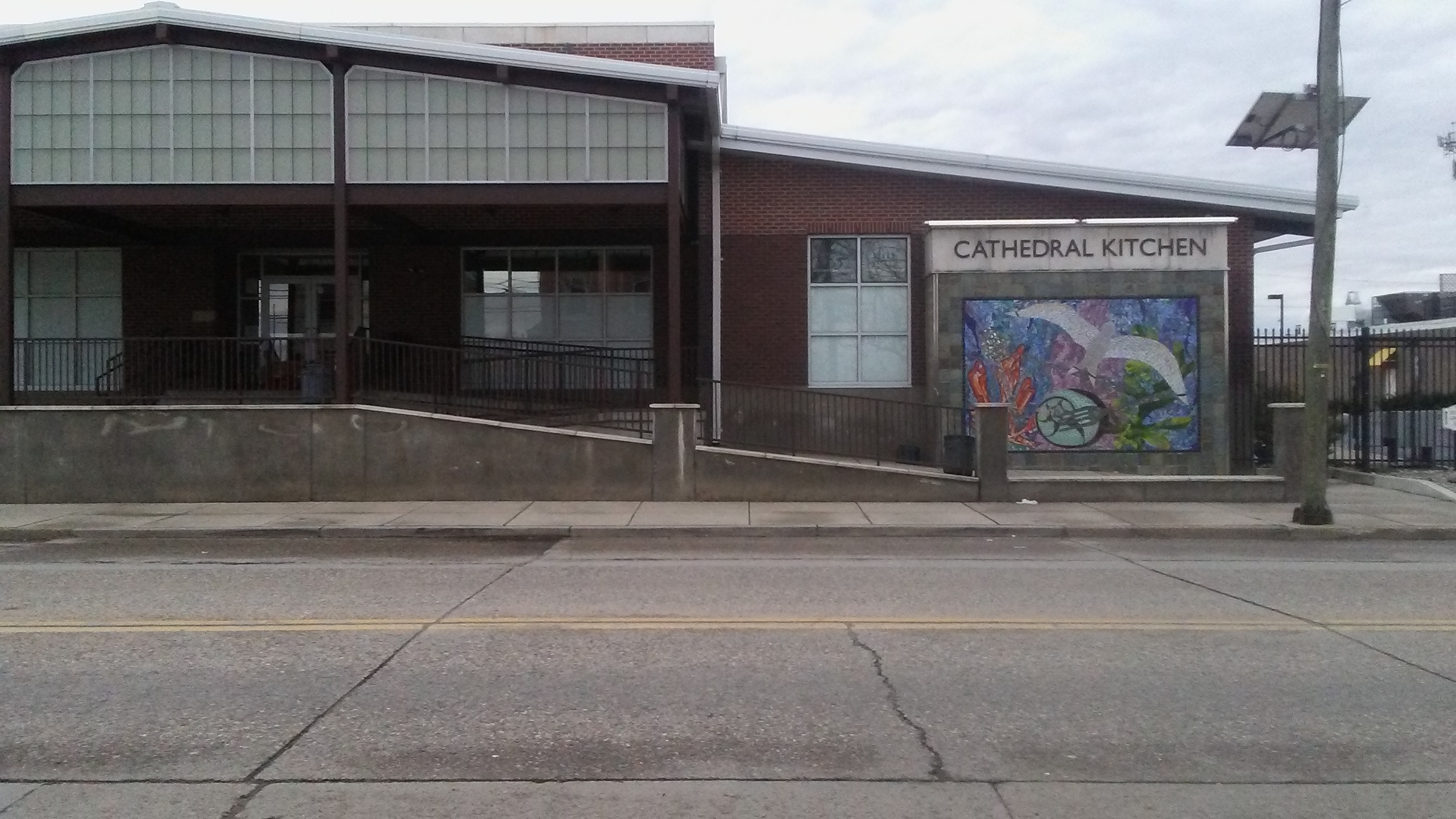
Cathedral Kitchen in Camden

The city has long had a history of philanthropy and charity, dating back to its founding. The city's founding families were quakers that were very interested in charitable causes like the care of orphans and helping runaway slaves. They were members of the Society of Friends whose members were the likes of William Penn. In 1865, the Society of Friends founded the Camden Home for Friendless Children. Since that home was segregated, the Society of Friends opened the West Jersey Colored Orphanage in 1874.

Camden has a variety of non-profit Tax-Exempt Organizations aimed to assist city residents with a wide range of health and social services free or reduced charge to residents. Camden City, having one of the highest rates of poverty in New Jersey, fueled residents and local organizations to develop organizations aimed to provide relief to its citizens. As of the 2000 Census, Camden's income per capita was $9,815. This ranking made Camden the poorest city in the state of New Jersey at the time, as well as one of the poorest cities in the United States . Camden also had one of the highest rates of childhood poverty in the nation.

== Economy ==
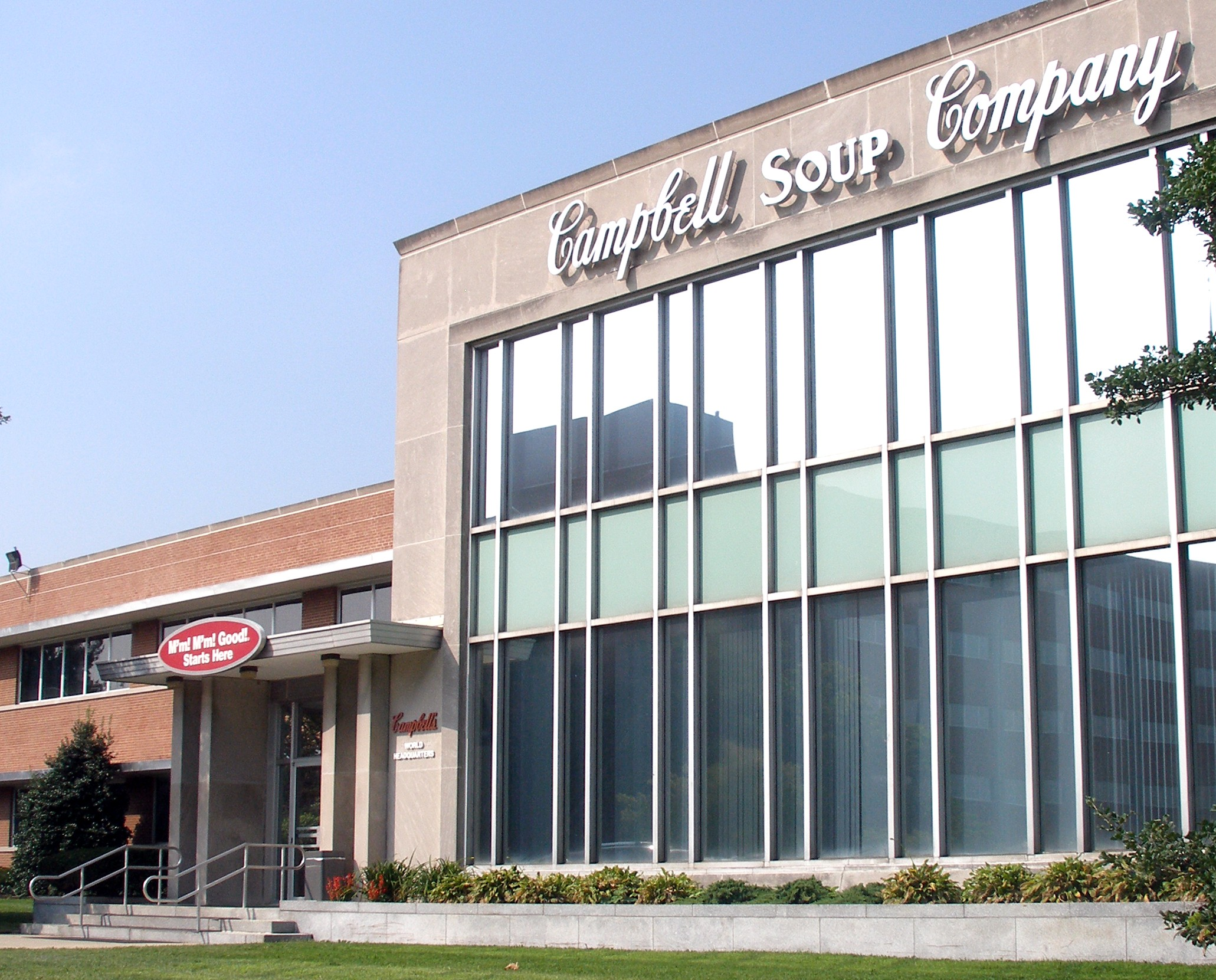
Campbell's's headquarters in Camden

About 45% of employment in Camden is in the "eds and meds" sector, providing educational and medical institutions.

In 2018, the city had an average residential property tax bill of $1,710, the lowest in the county, compared to an average bill of $6,644 in Camden County and $8,767 statewide.

=== Largest employers ===
- Campbell's
- Cooper University Hospital
- Delaware River Port Authority
- L3Harris Technologies, formerly L3 Technologies and L-3 Communications
- Our Lady of Lourdes Medical Center
- Rutgers University–Camden
- State of New Jersey
  - New Jersey Judiciary
- Subaru of America; relocated from Pennsauken in 2018
- UrbanPromise Ministry (largest private employer of teenagers)

=== Urban enterprise zone ===
Portions of Camden are part of a joint Urban Enterprise Zone. The city was selected in 1983 as one of the initial group of 10 zones chosen to participate in the program. In addition to other benefits to encourage employment within the Zone, shoppers can take advantage of a reduced 3.3125% sales tax rate (half of the 6.625% rate charged statewide) at eligible merchants. Established in September 1988, the city's Urban Enterprise Zone status expires in December 2023.

The UEZ program in Camden and four other original UEZ cities had been allowed to lapse as of January 1, 2017, after Governor Chris Christie, who called the program an "abject failure", vetoed a compromise bill that would have extended the status for two years. In May 2018, Governor Phil Murphy signed a law that reinstated the program in these five cities and extended the expiration date in other zones.

== Geography and architecture ==
According to the U.S. Census Bureau, the city had a total area of 10.34 square miles (26.78 km^{2}), including 8.92 square miles (23.10 km^{2}) of land and 1.42 square miles (3.68 km^{2}) of water (13.75%).

Camden borders Collingswood, Gloucester City, Oaklyn, Pennsauken Township and Woodlynne in Camden County, as well as Philadelphia across the Delaware River in Pennsylvania. Just offshore of Camden is Pettys Island, which is part of Pennsauken Township. The Cooper River (popular for boating) flows through Camden, and Newton Creek forms Camden's southern boundary with Gloucester City.

=== Neighborhoods ===
Camden contains more than 20 generally recognized neighborhoods:

- Ablett Village
- Bergen Square
- Beideman
- Broadway
- Centerville
- Center City/Downtown Camden/Central Business District
- Central Waterfront
- Cooper
- Cooper Grant
- Cooper Point
- Cramer Hill
- Dudley
- East Camden
- Fairview
- Gateway
- Kaighn Point
- Lanning Square
- Liberty Park
- Marlton
- Morgan Village
- North Camden
- Parkside
- Pavonia
- Pyne Point
- Rosedale
- South Camden/Waterfront South
- Stockton
- Walt Whitman Park
- Yorkship

=== Waterfront ===
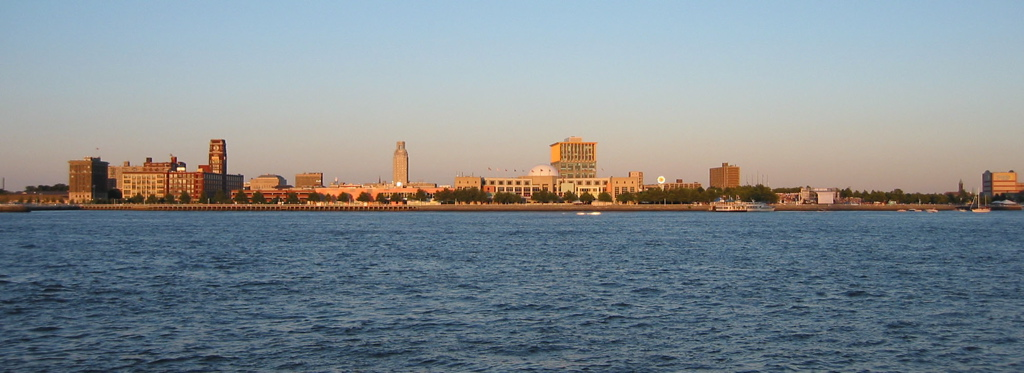
The Camden waterfront seen from across the Delaware River in Philadelphia in 2005

Historically, the Waterfront has always been a foundational part and major hub of the city. It was home to the New York Shipbuilding Company Shipyards until 1968. Since the 1990s, the Waterfront began a beacon of revitalization for the city. The city's waterfront, along the Delaware River is highlighted by its three main attractions, the USS New Jersey, the Freedom Mortgage Pavilion, and the Adventure Aquarium. The waterfront is also the headquarters for Catapult Learning, the Philadelphia 76ers Training Complex, American Water. Camden has two generally recognized neighborhoods located on the Delaware River waterfront, Central and South. Other attractions at the Waterfront are the Wiggins Park Riverstage and Marina, One Port Center, The Victor Lofts, the Walt Whitman House, the Walt Whitman Cultural Arts Center, the Rutgers–Camden Center for the Arts, the Camden Children's Garden, Cooper's Poynt Park (former site of Riverfront State Prison).

=== Port ===
On the Delaware River, with access to the Atlantic Ocean, the Port of Camden handles break bulk, bulk cargo, as well as some containers. Terminals fall under the auspices of the South Jersey Port Corporation as well as private operators such as Holt Logistics/Holtec International. The port receives hundreds of ships moving international and domestic cargo annually and is one of the USA's largest shipping centers for wood products, cocoa and perishables.

=== Housing ===
The most common type of home in Camden is rowhouse, similar to those in the neighboring city of Philadelphia. Saint Josephs Carpenter Society (SJCS) is a non profit that has rehabilitated 500 homes throughout the city.

Camden contains the United States' first federally funded planned community for working class residents, Yorkship Village (now called Fairview). The village was designed by Electus Darwin Litchfield, who was influenced by the "garden city" developments popular in England at the time.

In 2013, Cherokee Investment Partners had a plan to redevelop north Camden with 5,000 new homes and a shopping center on 450 acres (1.8 km^{2}). Cherokee dropped their plans in the face of local opposition and the slumping real estate market. They are among several companies receiving New Jersey Economic Development Authority (EDA) tax incentives to relocate jobs in the city.

=== Climate ===
Camden has a humid subtropical climate (Cfa in the Köppen climate classification) with hot summers and cool to cold winters.

Climate data for Camden, New Jersey
Month	Jan	Feb	Mar	Apr	May	Jun	Jul	Aug	Sep	Oct	Nov	Dec	Year
Mean daily maximum °F (°C)	41 (5)	45 (7)	54 (12)	65 (18)	74 (23)	82 (28)	87 (31)	85 (29)	78 (26)	67 (19)	57 (14)	46 (8)	65 (18)
Mean daily minimum °F (°C)	24 (−4)	26 (−3)	33 (1)	42 (6)	52 (11)	61 (16)	67 (19)	65 (18)	58 (14)	46 (8)	38 (3)	29 (−2)	45 (7)
Source: Weather.com "Camden, NJ Monthly Weather Forecast". Camden, NJ (08102). Weather.com. 2016.

== Education ==
=== Public schools ===
Camden's public schools are operated by the Camden City School District. The district is one of 31 former Abbott districts statewide that were established pursuant to the decision by the New Jersey Supreme Court in Abbott v. Burke which are now referred to as "SDA Districts" based on the requirement for the state to cover all costs for school building and renovation projects in these districts under the supervision of the New Jersey Schools Development Authority. As of the 2020–21 school year, the district, composed of 19 schools, had an enrollment of 7,553 students and 668.0 classroom teachers (on an FTE basis), for a student–teacher ratio of 11.3:1.

High schools in the district (with 2020–21 enrollment data from the National Center for Education Statistics) are Brimm Medical Arts High School (175; 9–12), Camden Big Picture Learning Academy (196; 6–12), Camden High School (347; 9–12), Creative Arts Academy (290; 6–12), Eastside High School (784; 9–12) and Pride Academy (63; 6–12).

=== Charter and renaissance schools ===
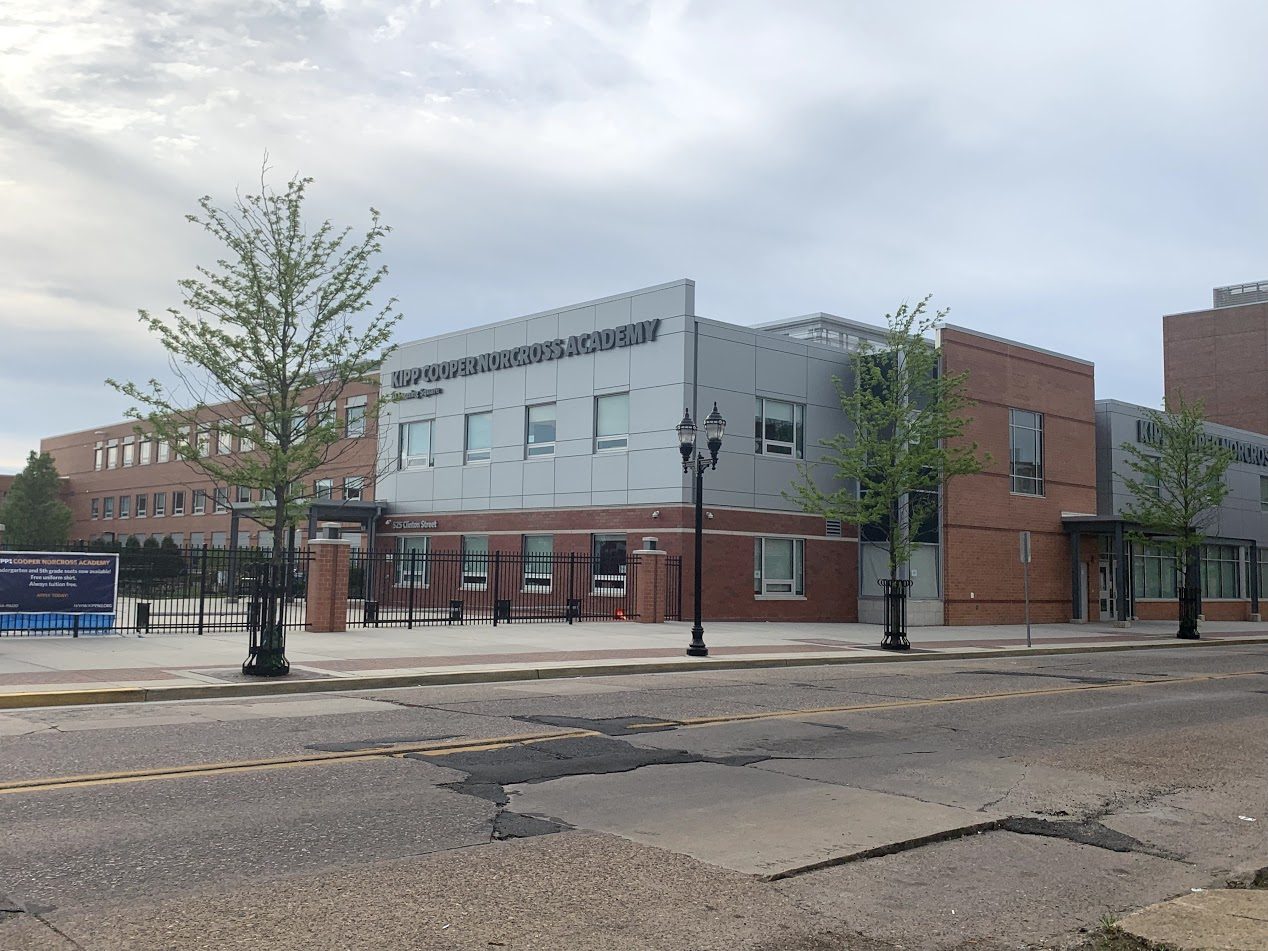
KIPP Cooper Norcross Lanning Square Primary and Middle School

In 2012, The Urban Hope Act was signed into law, allowing renaissance schools to open in Trenton, Newark, and Camden. The renaissance schools, run by charter companies, differed from charter schools, as they enrolled students based on the surrounding neighborhood, similar to the city school district. This makes renaissance schools a hybrid of charter and public schools. This is the act that allowed Knowledge Is Power Program (KIPP), Uncommon Schools, and Mastery Schools to open in the city.

Under the renaissance charter school proposal, the Henry L. Bonsall Family School became Uncommon Schools Camden Prep Mt. Ephraim Campus, East Camden Middle School has become part of Mastery Charter Schools, Francis X. Mc Graw Elementary School and Rafael Cordero Molina Elementary School have become part of the Mastery charter network. The J.G Whittier Family school has become part of the KIPP Public Charter Schools as KIPP Cooper Norcross Academy. Students were given the option to stay with the school under their transition or seek other alternatives.

In the 2013–14 school year, Camden city proposed a budget of $72 million to allot to charter schools in the city. In previous years, Camden city charter schools have used $52 million and $66 million in the 2012–2013 and 2013–2014 school years, respectively.

March 9, 2015, marked the first year of the new Camden Charter Schools open enrollment. Mastery and Uncommon charter schools did not meet enrollment projections for their first year of operation by 15% and 21%, according to Education Law Center.

In October 2016, Governor Chris Christie, Camden Mayor Dana L. Redd, Camden Public Schools Superintendent Paymon Rouhanifard, and state and local representatives announced a historical $133 million investment of a new Camden High School Project. The new school is planned to be ready for student occupancy in 2021. It would have 9th and 12th grade.

As of 2019, there are 3,850 Camden students enrolled in one of the city's renaissance schools, with 4,350 Camden students are enrolled one of the city's charter schools. Combined, these students make up approximately 55% of the 15,000 students in Camden.

==== Charter schools ====
- Camden's Promise Charter School
- Environment Community Opportunity (ECO) Charter School
- Freedom Prep Charter School
- Hope Community Charter School
- LEAP Academy University Charter School

==== Renaissance schools ====
- Uncommon Schools Camden Prep
- KIPP Cooper Norcross
  - Lanning Square Primary School
  - Lanning Square Middle School
  - Whittier Middle School
- Mastery Schools of Camden
  - Cramer Hill Elementary
  - Molina Lower Elementary
  - Molina Upper Elementary
  - East Camden Middle
  - Mastery High School of Camden
  - McGraw Elementary

=== Private education ===
Holy Name School, Sacred Heart Grade School, and St. Joseph Pro-Cathedral School (founded in 1894) are K–8 elementary schools operating under the auspices of the Roman Catholic Diocese of Camden. They operate as four of the five schools in the Catholic Partnership Schools, a post-parochial model of Urban Catholic Education.

=== Higher education ===
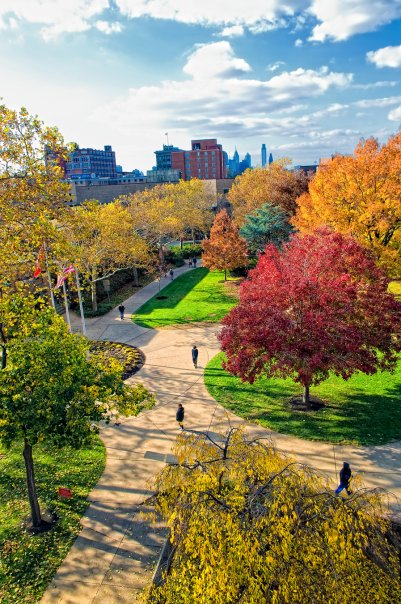
Rutgers University–Camden and the Philadelphia skyline (background)

The University District, adjacent to the downtown, is home to the following institutions:

- Camden County College – one of three main campuses; the college first came to the city in 1969 and constructed a campus building in Camden in 1991.
- Rowan University at Camden, satellite campus – the Camden campus began with a program for teacher preparation in 1969 and expanded with standard college courses the following year and a full-time day program in 1980.
- Cooper Medical School of Rowan University (opened 2012)
- Rutgers University–Camden – the Camden campus, one of three main sites in the university system, began as South Jersey Law School and the College of South Jersey in the 1920s and was merged into Rutgers in 1950.
  - Camden College of Arts & Sciences
  - School of Business – Camden
  - Rutgers School of Law-Camden
- University of Medicine and Dentistry of New Jersey (UMDNJ)
  - Affiliated with Cooper University Hospital
- Coriell Institute for Medical Research
  - Affiliated with Cooper University Hospital
  - Affiliated with Rowan University
  - Affiliated with University of Medicine and Dentistry of New Jersey

=== Libraries ===
The city was once home to two Carnegie libraries, the Main Building and the Cooper Library in Johnson Park. The city's once extensive library system, beleaguered by financial difficulties, threatened to close at the end of 2010, but was incorporated into the county system. The main branch closed in February 2011, and was later reopened by the county in the bottom floor of the Paul Robeson Library at Rutgers University.

Camden also has three academic libraries; The Paul Robeson Library at Rutgers University-Camden serves Rutgers undergraduate and graduate students, as well as students from the Camden campuses of Camden County College and Rowan University. Rutgers Law School has a law library and Cooper Medical School at Rowan has a medical library.

== Sports ==
=== Camden Athletic Complex ===
The Camden Athletic Complex (former site of Campbell's Field) which was completed in 2022. it contains a baseball field, track and field area, soccer field, and lacrosse field. The Camden Riversharks were an American professional baseball team based in Camden, which played out of the former Campbell's Field. An investment totaling $15 million, planned to be split evenly between Rutgers and the city of Camden, will reportedly develop the area into a recreational complex for the city, as well as accommodations for the university's NCAA Division III sports teams.

=== Philadelphia 76ers training facility ===
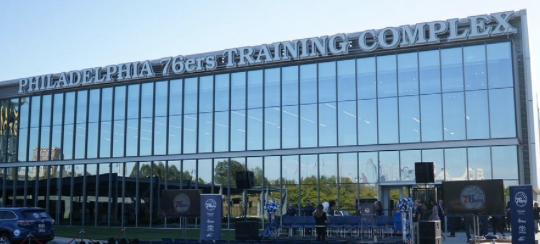
The training facility of the Philadelphia 76ers in Camden

The team found a property at the Camden Waterfront. An $82 million grant was approved by the New Jersey Economic Development Authority to begin construction of the training facility in Camden, and was scheduled to break ground in October 2014. The grant was somewhat controversial in that it saves the 76ers organization from paying any property taxes or fees that would be accrued by the building over its first decade. Vocal opponents of the facility claim that the site has now joined a list of large companies or industries that are invited to Camden with significant monetary incentive, at great expense to local tax payers as a form of corporate welfare. Based on contingent hiring, the grant was to be paid out over 10 years, with the facility scheduled to host practices by 2016. The training facilities include the two full-size courts, as well as a weight room, full hydrotherapy room, Gatorade Fuel Bar, full players-only restaurant and personal chef, medical facilities, film room, and full locker room.

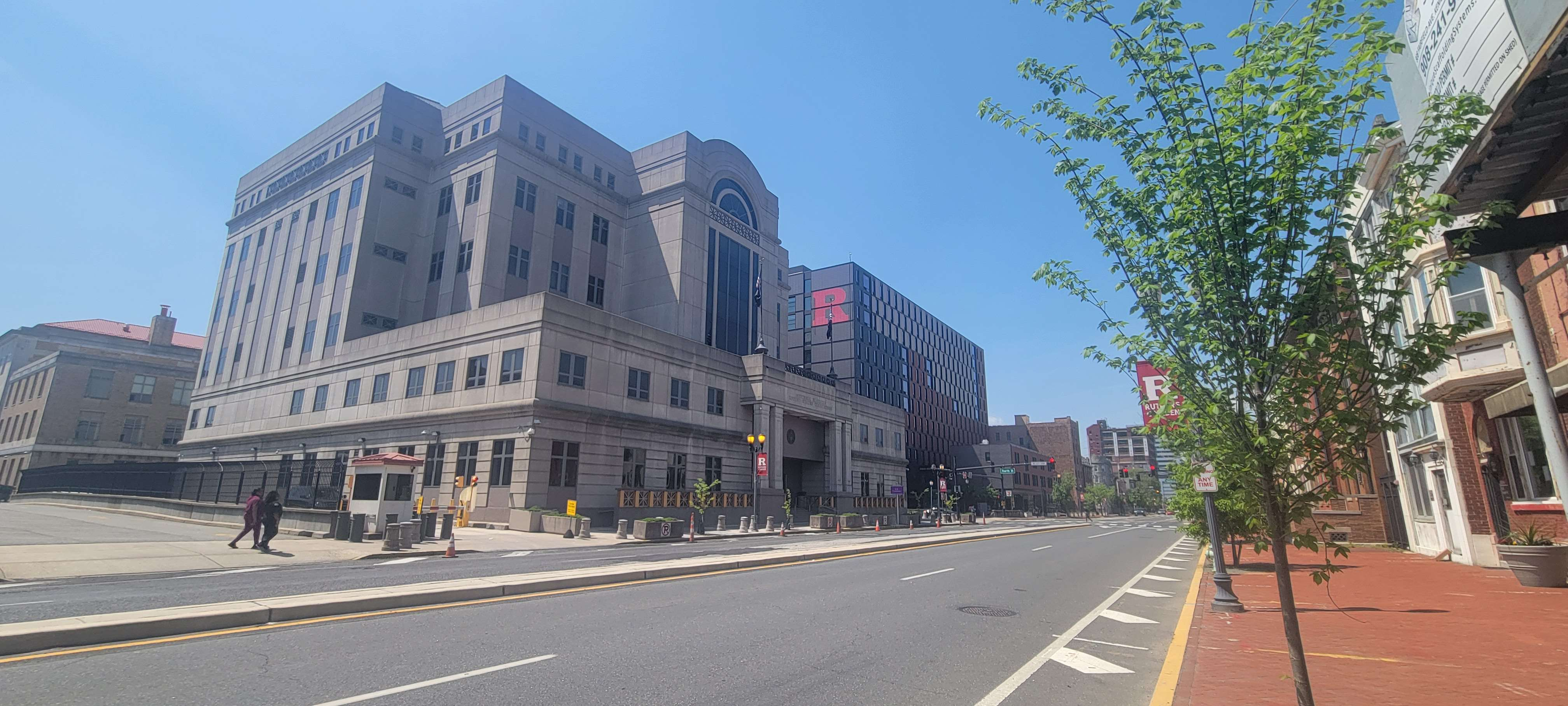
This is the front of the US District Court facing Cooper Street in Camden, NJ

== Government ==
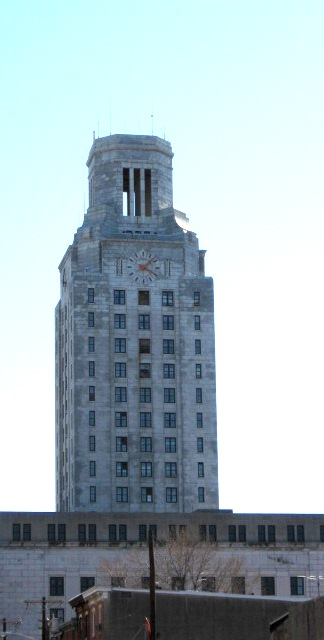
Camden's City Hall opened in 1931 and is the tallest building in Camden.

Since July 1, 1961, the city has operated within the Faulkner Act, formally known as the Optional Municipal Charter Law, under a Mayor-Council form of government. Since 1994, the city has been divided into four council districts; previously, the entire council was elected at-large. Elected officials are elected to four-year terms in odd-numbered years, with the mayor and the three at-large seats up for election together and the four ward seats up for vote two years later.

As of 2026, the Mayor of Camden is Democrat Victor Carstarphen, whose term of office ends December 31, 2029. Members of the City Council are Council President Angel Fuentes (D, 2029; at large), Vice President Sheila Davis (D, 2029; at large), Arthur Barclay (D, 2027; Ward 1), Christopher R. Collins (D, 2027; Ward 2), Falio Leyba-Martinez (D, 2027; Ward 3), Jannette Ramos (D, 2027; Ward 4) and Noemi G. Soria-Perez (D, 2029; at large).

It was home to the Norcross brothers, three brothers who have dominated Southern Jersey democratic politics for the past 25 years, until legal troubles in 2024 led them to take a backseat. The city has had its struggles with corruption throughout its political history. Three Camden mayors have been jailed for corruption: Angelo Errichetti, Arnold Webster, and Milton Milan.

=== Federal, state and county representation ===
Camden is located in New Jersey's 1st Congressional District and is part of New Jersey's 5th state legislative district.

For the 119th United States Congress, New Jersey's 1st congressional district is represented by Donald Norcross (D, Camden).New Jersey is represented in the United States Senate by Democrats Cory Booker (Newark, term ends 2027) and Andy Kim (Moorestown, term ends 2031).

Camden County is governed by a Board of County Commissioners composed of seven members chosen at-large in partisan elections for three-year terms on a staggered basis by the residents of the county, with either two or three seats up for election each year as part of the November general election. At a reorganization meeting held in January after each election, the newly constituted Board of Commissioners selects one member to serve as Director and another as Deputy Director, each serving a one-year term in that role. As of 2025, Camden County's Commissioners are: Commissioner Director Louis Cappelli Jr. (D, Collingswood, 2026), Commissioner Deputy Director Edward T. McDonnell (D, Pennsauken Township, 2025), Virginia Ruiz Betteridge (D, Runnemede, 2025), Almar Dyer (D, Pennsauken Township, 2027), Melinda Kane (D, Cherry Hill, 2027), Jeffrey L. Nash (D, Winslow Township, 2027), and Jonathan L. Young Sr. (D, Berlin Township, 2026).

Camden County's constitutional officers are: Clerk Pamela Rosen Lampitt (D, Cherry Hill, 2029) Sheriff Chuck Billingham (D, Gloucester City, 2027) and Surrogate Michelle Gentek-Mayer (D, Gloucester Township, 2025).

=== Politics ===
Camden has historically been a stronghold of the Democratic Party. As of November 6, 2018, there were 42,264 registered voters in the city of Camden. As of March 23, 2011, there were 43,893 registered voters in Camden, of which 17,403 (39.6%) were registered as Democrats, 885 (2.0%) were registered as Republicans and 25,601 (58.3%) were registered as Unaffiliated. All Camden mayors since 1935 have been Democrats. The last Republican Camden mayor was Frederick von Nieda, who only sat in office for a year. During his second term, Obama visited Camden in 2015 and said that "Hold you up as a symbol of promise for the nation. This city is on to something, no one is suggesting that the job is done," the president said. "It's still a work in progress." In the 2012 presidential election, Democrat Barack Obama was seeking reelection and was challenged by Mitt Romney. The city overwhelmingly voted for Obama in the biggest Democratic landslide in Camden's history.

United States presidential election results for Camden
Year	Republican		Democratic		Third party(ies)	
Year	No.	%	No.	%	No.	%
2024	2,803	17.08%	13,462	82.04%	144	0.88%
2020	1,994	10.12%	17,617	89.41%	93	0.47%
2016	838	4.04%	19,654	94.82%	235	1.13%
2012	683	2.97%	22,254	96.78%	57	0.25%
2008	1,213	5.16%	22,197	94.35%	116	0.49%
2004	2,368	12.88%	15,914	86.59%	97	0.53%

In the 2016 presidential election, Democrat Hillary Clinton received overwhelming support from the city of Camden. On May 11, 2016, Clinton held a rally at Camden County College. In the 2012 presidential election, Democrat Barack Obama received 96.8% of the vote (22,254 cast), ahead of Republican Mitt Romney with 3.0% (683 votes), and other candidates with 0.2% (57 votes), among the 23,230 ballots cast by the city's 47,624 registered voters (236 ballots were spoiled), for a turnout of 48.8%. In the 2008 presidential election, Democrat Barack Obama received 91.1% of the vote (22,197 cast), ahead of Republican John McCain, who received around 5.0% (1,213 votes), with 24,374 ballots cast among the city's 46,654 registered voters, for a turnout of 52.2%. In the 2004 presidential election, Democrat John Kerry received 84.4% of the vote (15,914 ballots cast), outpolling Republican George W. Bush, who received around 12.6% (2,368 votes), with 18,858 ballots cast among the city's 37,765 registered voters, for a turnout percentage of 49.9.

Gubernatorial election results for Camden
Year	Republican		Democratic		Third party(ies)	
Year	No.	%	No.	%	No.	%
2025	743	6.83%	10,040	92.31%	93	0.86%
2021	581	8.23%	6,417	90.92%	60	0.85%
2017	293	3.98%	6,919	93.93%	154	2.09%
2013	1,569	18.76%	6,680	79.86%	116	1.39%
2009	604	5.94%	8,700	85.58%	862	8.48%
2005	692	8.19%	7,489	88.64%	268	3.17%

In the 2013 gubernatorial election, Democrat Barbara Buono received 79.9% of the vote (6,680 cast), ahead of Republican Chris Christie with 18.8% (1,569 votes), and other candidates with 1.4% (116 votes), among the 9,796 ballots cast by the city's 48,241 registered voters (1,431 ballots were spoiled), for a turnout of 20.3%. In the 2009 gubernatorial election, Democrat Jon Corzine received 85.6% of the vote (8,700 ballots cast), ahead of both Republican Chris Christie with 5.9% (604 votes) and Independent Chris Daggett with 0.8% (81 votes), with 10,166 ballots cast among the city's 43,165 registered voters, yielding a 23.6% turnout.

United States Senate election results for Camden1
Year	Republican		Democratic		Third party(ies)	
Year	No.	%	No.	%	No.	%
2024	2,339	15.12%	12,837	82.96%	297	1.92%
2018	746	5.73%	11,272	86.57%	1,002	7.70%
2012	578	2.69%	20,786	96.72%	128	0.60%
2006	713	8.13%	7,869	89.73%	188	2.14%

United States Senate election results for Camden2
Year	Republican		Democratic		Third party(ies)	
Year	No.	%	No.	%	No.	%
2020	1,710	8.67%	17,768	90.12%	237	1.20%
2014	453	5.14%	8,214	93.13%	153	1.73%
2013	183	3.29%	5,338	95.90%	45	0.81%
2008	1,004	5.07%	18,590	93.81%	223	1.13%

== Emergency services ==
=== Camden Fire Department (CFD) ===
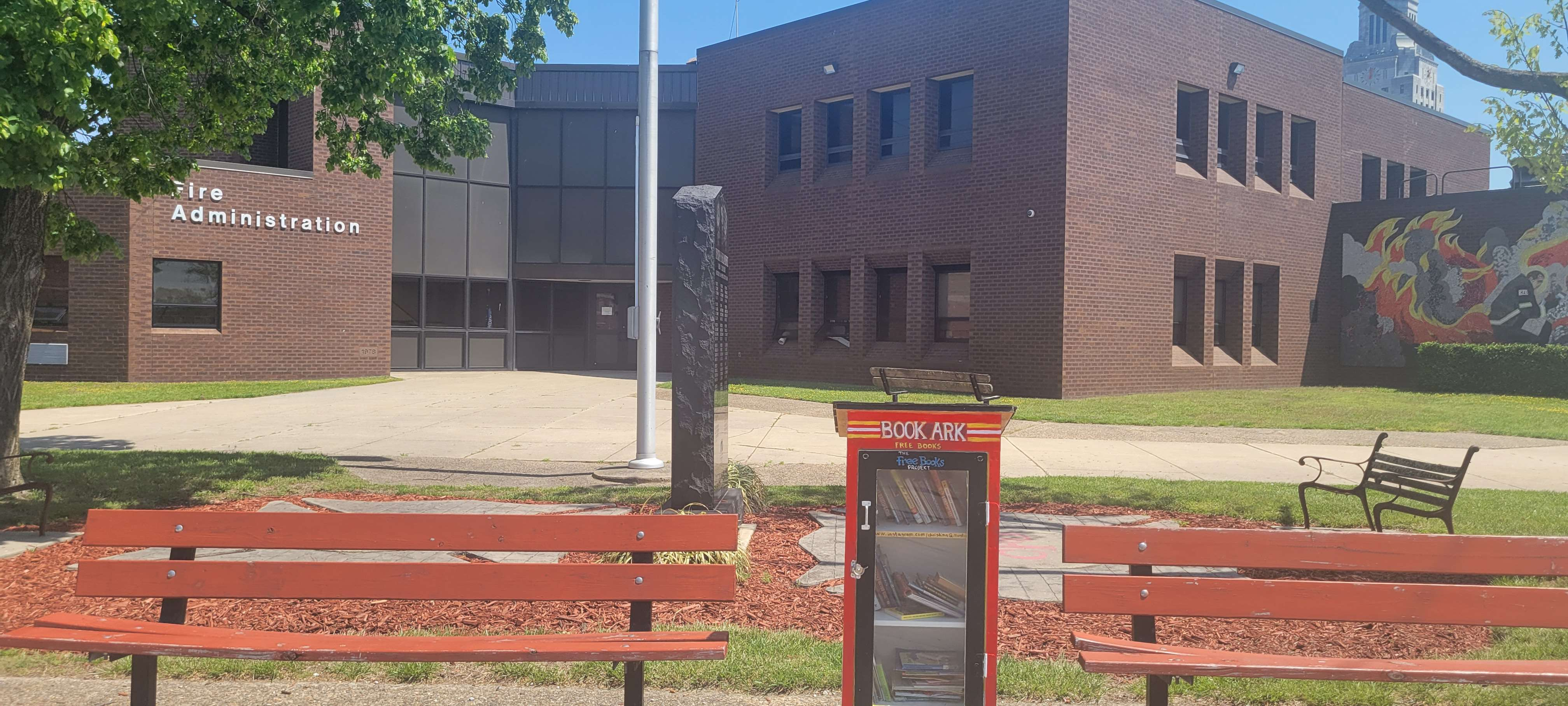
The Fire Administration Building on N 3rd Street in Camden, NJ

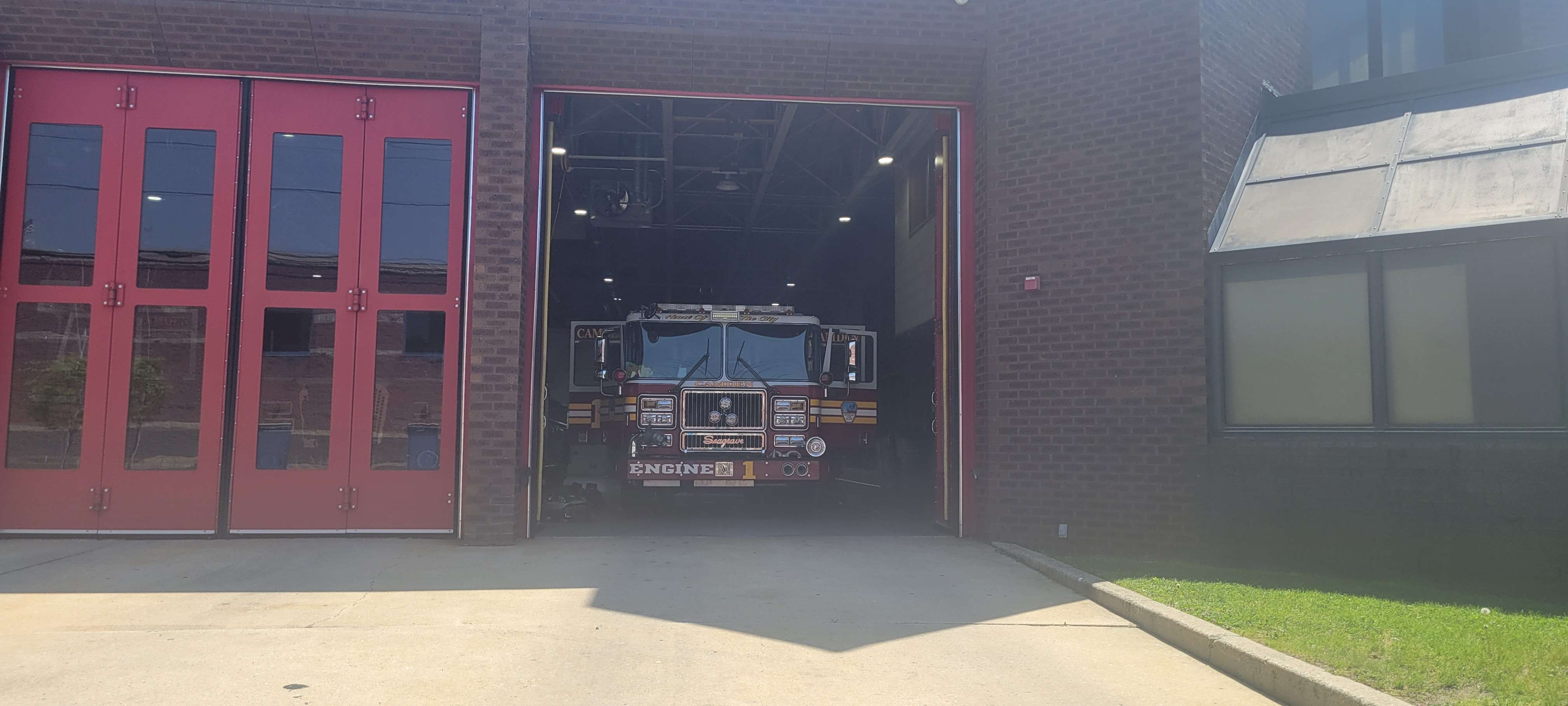
Fire Engine at N 3rd St. Fire Administration Building.

Officially organized in 1869, the Camden Fire Department (CFD) is the oldest paid fire department in New Jersey and is among the oldest paid fire departments in the United States. The Camden Fire Department currently operates out of five fire stations, organized into two battalions. Each battalion is commanded by a battalion chief, who in turn reports to a deputy chief. The CFD currently operates five engine companies, one squad (rescue-pumper), three ladder companies, and one rescue company, as well as several other special, support, and reserve units. The department's fireboat is docked on the Delaware River. Since 2010, the Camden Fire Department has suffered severe economic cutbacks, including company closures and staffing cuts.

=== Camden County Police Department (CCPD) ===
On May 1, 2013, Camden Police Department was disbanded due to a union contract that made it financially impossible to keep officers on the street. The Camden County Police Department was formed to succeed the Camden Police Department. Camden County's Police Department brought in 25 new officers to train in neighborhoods in hopes they could regain the trust of local communities. Because of the reorganized force in 2013, the number of cops in the streets has increased, and spread throughout Camden. Camden's new police force began patrolling in tandem, speaking with residents, and driving patrol cars. A CNN report proposed that Camden might be a national model for what police abolition or "defunding the police" could look like.

== Crime ==
Camden once had a national reputation for its violent crime rates, although recent years have seen a significant drop in violent crime, with 2017 seeing the lowest number of homicides in three decades.

Camden
- Crime rates* (2017)

Violent crimes
- Homicide: 31
- Rape: 75
- Robbery: 411
- Aggravated assault: 956

Property crimes
- Burglary: 584
- Larceny-theft: 1,409
- Motor vehicle theft: 551
- Note: Reported crimes per 100,000 population Source: 2017 Neighborhood Scout

Morgan Quitno Press has ranked Camden as one of the top ten most dangerous cities in the United States since 1998, when they first included cities with populations less than 100,000. Camden was ranked as the third-most dangerous city in 2002, and the most dangerous city overall in 2004 and 2005. It improved to the fifth spot for the 2006 and 2007 rankings but rose to number two in 2008 and to the most dangerous spot in 2009. Morgan Quitno based its rankings on crime statistics reported to the Federal Bureau of Investigation in six categories: murder, rape, robbery, aggravated assault, burglary, and auto theft. In 2011 in The Nation, journalist Chris Hedges described Camden as "the physical refuse of postindustrial America", plagued with homelessness, drug trafficking, prostitution, robbery, looting, constant violence, and an overwhelmed police force (which in 2011 lost nearly half of its officers to budget-related layoffs).

On October 29, 2012, the FBI announced Camden was ranked first in violent crime per capita of cities with over 50,000 residents.

There were 23 homicides in Camden in 2017, the lowest since 1987 and almost half as many as the 44 murders the previous year. Both homicides and non-fatal shootings have declined sharply since 2012, when there were a record 67 homicides in the city. In 2020, there were, again, 23 homicides reported. Though 2021 also saw 23 homicides, there was, otherwise, a further reduction in violent crime, contrasting national trends.

In 2018, the Camden County Police Department reported that violent crime had dropped 18%, led by a 21% decline in aggravated assaults; overall nonviolent crimes fell by 12%, the number of arson incidents fell by 29%, burglaries by 21%, and non-fatal "shooting hit incidents" had dropped by 15%. In 2018, 2019, and 2020, there were 22, 24, and 23 homicides respectively.

Total violent crime in the city declined in 2022, despite 28 murders and a spike of 29% in non-violent crime, highlighted by a sharp increase in car-related crime. By 2025, Camden had achieved a milestone of the first summer in 50 years that did not have a murder. Between 2012 and 2025, homicides in the city of Camden fell 82 percent.

== Transportation ==
=== Public transportation ===
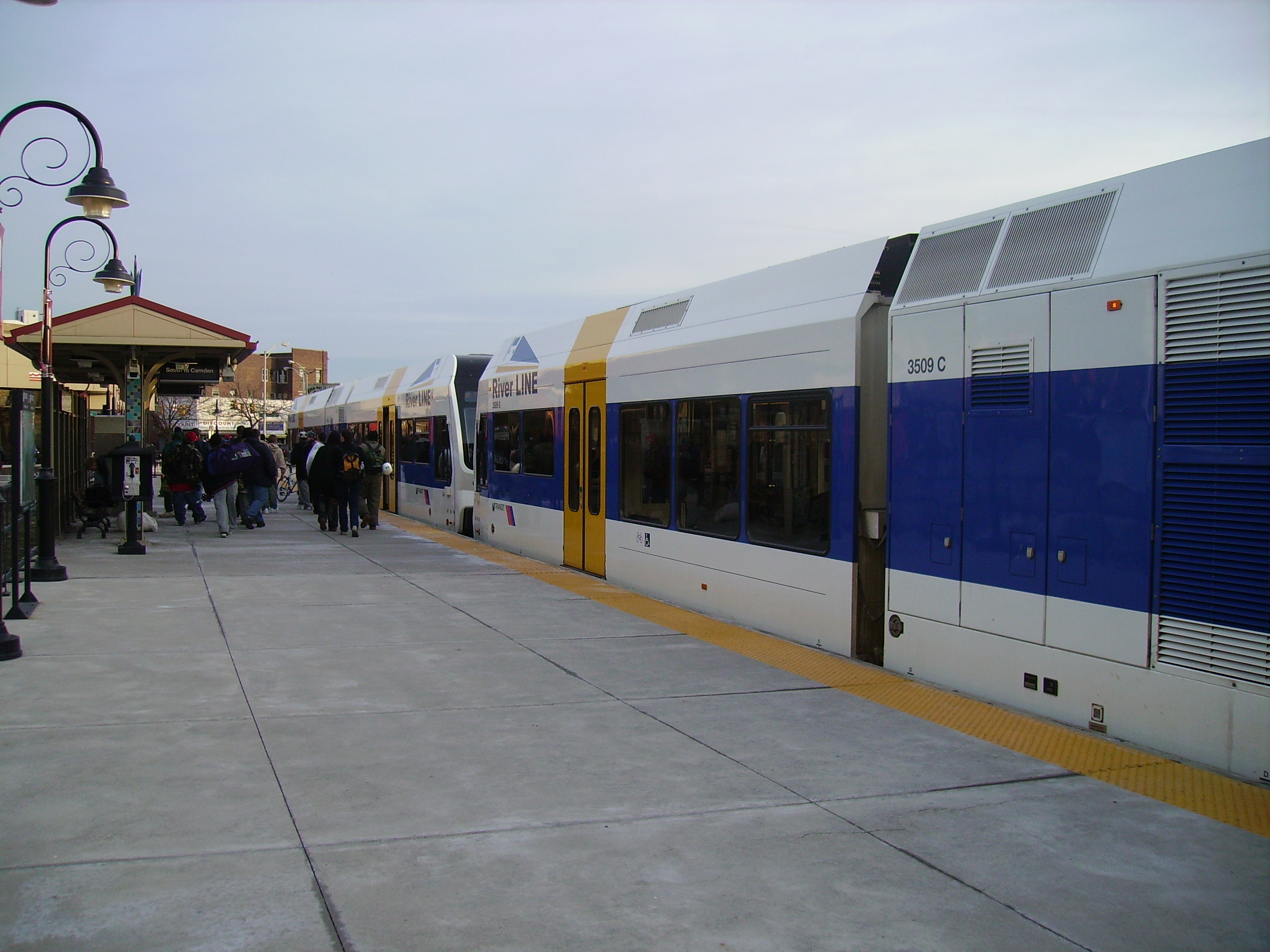
River Line at Walter Rand, a light rail system connecting Camden and Trenton

The Walter Rand Transportation Center opened in May 1989 under the name of Camden Transportation Center and was renamed in 1994 for former New Jersey State Senator Walter Rand. The surface level bus transfer center located on the corner of Martin Luther King Boulevard and Broadway, includes both indoor and outdoor stations and runs between the hours of 6am and 9:30pm, seven days a week. A majority of buses that stop at the center are NJ Transit buses that provide inexpensive and quick transportation to Philadelphia, Camden and Burlington Counties surrounding cities. The different routes include 313, 315, 316, 317, 400, 401, 402, 403, 404, 405, 406, 407, 408, 409, 410, 412, 413, 418, 419, 450, 451, 452, 453, 457 and 551. Depending on distance and route the bus fare varies from under a dollar for closer stops, up to fifty dollars for farther stations including Philadelphia and Atlantic City. Along with the NJ Transit buses, the center is also home to many Greyhound Lines routes, that provide transportation to neighboring cities as well as to destinations all around the country, with fares varying based on the destination. Along with the bus stops, the center is home to two rail road system stations, the Walter Rand River Line station and PATCO, Broadway station which provides access to the buses from the surrounding area.

Since opening in March 2004, NJ Transit's River Line has offered light rail service to cities along the Delaware River starting in North Camden, and terminating in Trenton. There are four stations located in the city, the southern most station is located at Freedom Mortgage Pavilion located on the Delaware River, and goes north along the river up to Trenton. The second and third most south stations in Camden stop at the Camden Adventure Aquarium and at Rutgers University. The last stop in the city, the Walter Rand Transportation Center, located on Martin Luther King Boulevard and Broadway, is a major transportation hub where the PATCO, NJ Transit buses, and Greyhounds all meet.

The PATCO Speedline offers frequent 24-hour train service to Philadelphia and the suburbs to the east in Camden County, including Camden, Collingswood, Haddon Township, Haddonfield, Cherry Hill, Voorhees and Lindenwold. Throughout the two states there are a total of 13 stations. Unlike most major US transit systems, the PACTO Speedline is running 24-hours a day. Opening in 1926 under the name of The Delaware River Bridge Commission, the rail consisted of six stops in Philadelphia stops and two in Camden, City Hall, and Broadway station. The first station after crossing the river into Philadelphia, Franklin Square closed in 1979 because of the low number of riders. The station was proposed for a remodel and is planned on opening during the summer of 2024.

The RiverLink Ferry opened March 1992, as a passenger ferry service that crossed the Delaware River connecting the Camden Waterfront with Philadelphia's, Penn's Landing. The ferry operates daily from May through September, and on Fridays through Sundays in April and October. Docking at Wiggins Park, located between the Adventure Aquarium and the Battleship New Jersey, the ferry provides access to the Adventure Aquarium, Battleship New Jersey, Camden's Children's Garden, and the Freedom Mortgage Pavilion. On the Philadelphia side of the river the ferry docks at the Independence Seaport Museum, and provides access to the many attractions located at Penns Landing, including multiple city piers, and restaurants as well as Museums, the battle ship Olympia, and the submarine Becuna. Round trip ticket prices range from $8 for children and seniors to $10 for adults while children under the age of four ride for free.

The RiverLink Ferry was not the first ferry to call Camden home. Since the start of the United States there has been a need to transport goods and people across the Delaware. Before the construction of the Benjamin Franklin Bridge, there were multiple ferries that launched from Camdens waterfront including on Market street, and Vine street located in the downtown area, as well as Kaighn Avenue located in South Camden. During the winter when the river had frozen horse were used to tow the ferries across like sleds, which helped slow the number of injuries and death that occurred from individuals that walked across the ice. On one occasion the fire started aboard one of the ferries. On March 15, 1856, the Delaware River was full of floating chucks of ice rushing through the rough current when flames burst out along the upper deck. People on board did their best to calm the fire with buckets of freezing water but resorted to jumping over board. As a result, over sixty people died in the accident with countless missing while only 30 made it out alive. Between the years of 1727 and 1766 more than 800 slaves were brought by three different ferries and sold in Downtown, Camden. Today there are historical signs placed at these three sites to commemorate the people sold there.

=== Roads and highways ===
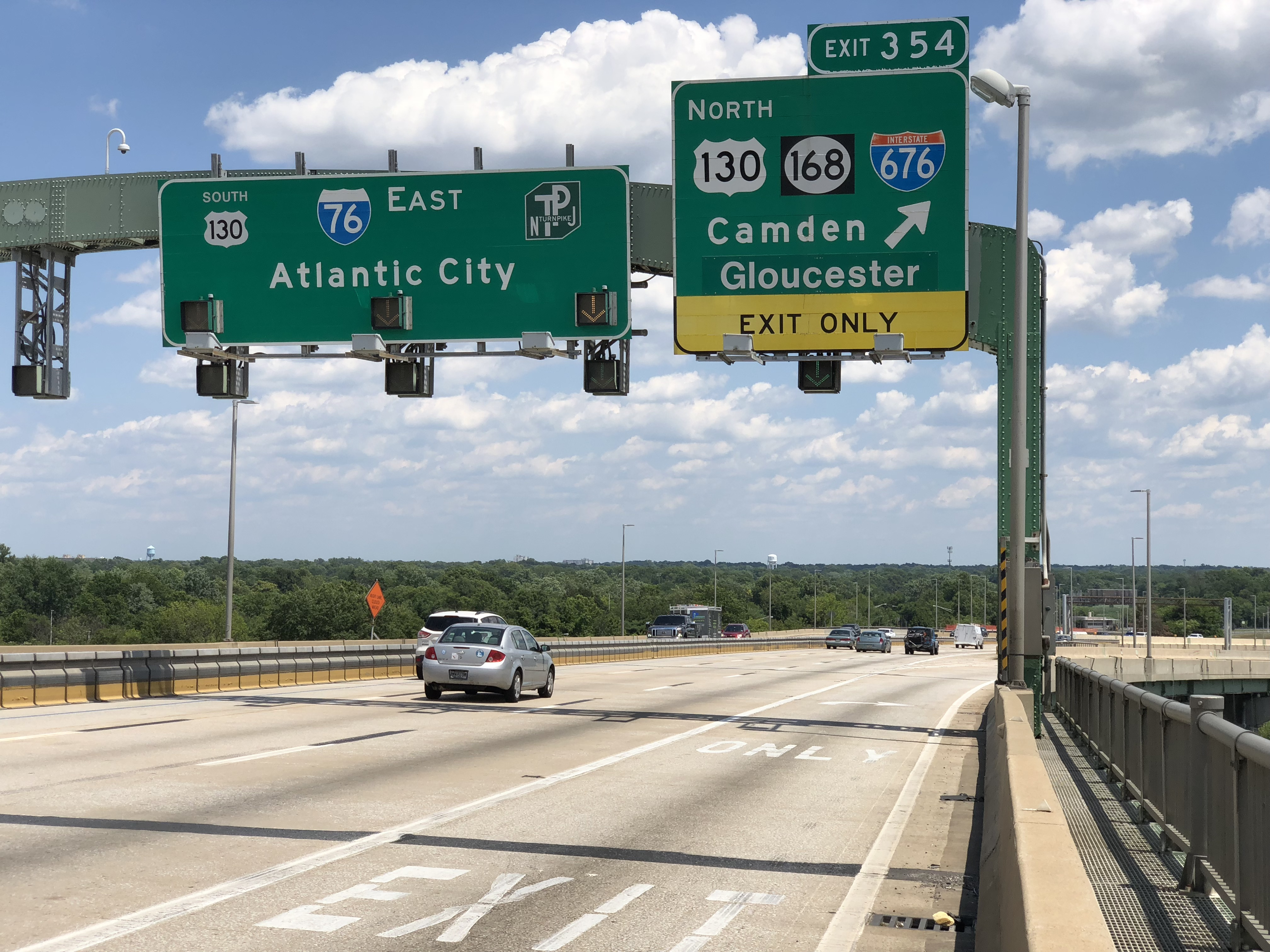
Eastbound on I-76 at I-676 in Camden

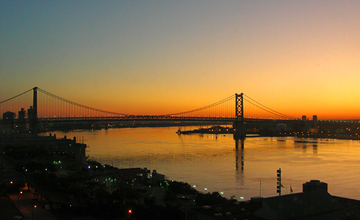
The Benjamin Franklin Bridge at sunrise, connecting Camden (right) with Philadelphia

As of May 2010, the city had a total of 181.92 miles (292.77 km) of roadways, of which 147.54 miles (237.44 km) were maintained by the municipality, 25.39 miles (40.86 km) by Camden County, 6.60 miles (10.62 km) by the New Jersey Department of Transportation and 2.39 miles (3.85 km) by the Delaware River Port Authority.

Interstate 676 and U.S. Route 30 run through Camden to the Benjamin Franklin Bridge on the north side of the city. Interstate 76 passes through briefly and interchanges with Interstate 676.

Route 168 passes through briefly in the south and County Routes 537, 543, 551 and 561 all travel through the center of the city.

== Environmental problems ==
Camden has faced many environmental problems due to its history of heavy industry and the improper disposal of contaminants. Environmental concerns include air/water pollution and soil contamination. There are several Superfund sites throughout the city. In recent years, illegal dumping has become an issue due to the large number of vacant lots throughout the city and a lack of security and maintenance.

== Demographics ==
Historical population
Census	Pop.	Note	%±
1840	3,371		—
1850	9,479		181.2%
1860	14,358		51.5%
1870	20,045		39.6%
1880	41,659		107.8%
1890	58,313		40.0%
1900	75,935		30.2%
1910	94,538		24.5%
1920	116,309		23.0%
1930	118,700		2.1%
1940	117,536		−1.0%
1950	124,555		6.0%
1960	117,159		−5.9%
1970	102,551		−12.5%
1980	84,910		−17.2%
1990	87,492		3.0%
2000	79,904		−8.7%
2010	77,344		−3.2%
2020	71,791		−7.2%
2024 (est.)	71,749		−0.1%
Population sources: 1840–2000; 1840–1920 1840 1850–1870; 1850 1870 1880–1890; 1890–1910 1840–1930; 1940–2000 2000; 2010 2020

=== Racial and ethnic composition ===
Camden, New Jersey – Racial and ethnic composition Note: the US Census treats Hispanic/Latino as an ethnic category. This table excludes Latinos from the racial categories and assigns them to a separate category. Hispanics/Latinos may be of any race.
Race / Ethnicity (NH = Non-Hispanic)	Pop 1990	Pop 2000	Pop 2010	Pop 2020	% 1990	% 2000	% 2010	% 2020
White alone (NH)	12,582	5,671	3,792	2,922	14.38%	7.10%	4.90%	4.07%
Black or African American alone (NH)	46,151	39,753	34,277	27,800	52.75%	49.75%	44.32%	38.72%
Native American or Alaska Native alone (NH)	265	188	235	126	0.30%	0.24%	0.30%	0.18%
Asian alone (NH)	1,008	1,869	1,599	1,229	1.15%	2.34%	2.07%	1.71%
Pacific Islander alone (NH)	N/A	20	15	11	N/A	0.03%	0.02%	0.02%
Other race alone (NH)	213	129	109	315	0.24%	0.16%	0.14%	0.44%
Mixed race or Multiracial (NH)	N/A	1,255	938	1,476	N/A	1.57%	1.21%	2.06%
Hispanic or Latino (any race)	27,273	31,019	36,379	37,912	31.17%	38.82%	47.04%	52.81%
Total	87,492	79,904	77,344	71,791	100.00%	100.00%	100.00%	100.00%

=== 2020 census ===
As of the 2020 census, Camden had a population of 71,791, making it the 14th-most populous municipality in the state, a decrease of 5,553 (−7.2%) from the 2010 census count of 77,344, when it was the 12th-largest in the state by population, falling behind both Brick Township and nearby Cherry Hill, which in turn reflected a decline of 1,984 (−2.5%) from the 79,318 counted in the 2000 census. The Census Bureau's Population Estimates Program calculated a population of 71,100 for 2023, making it the 532nd-most populous municipality in the nation.

The median age was 32.1 years. 28.9% of residents were under the age of 18 and 10.3% of residents were 65 years of age or older. For every 100 females there were 92.0 males, and for every 100 females age 18 and over there were 87.7 males age 18 and over.

All residents lived in urban areas.

There were 24,385 households in Camden, of which 40.1% had children under the age of 18 living in them. Of all households, 21.4% were married-couple households, 22.0% were households with a male householder and no spouse or partner present, and 47.4% were households with a female householder and no spouse or partner present. About 27.7% of all households were made up of individuals and 9.7% had someone living alone who was 65 years of age or older.

There were 27,670 housing units, of which 11.9% were vacant. The homeowner vacancy rate was 1.6% and the rental vacancy rate was 7.5%.

Racial composition as of the 2020 census
Race	Number	Percent
White	7,453	10.4%
Black or African American	30,187	42.0%
American Indian and Alaska Native	760	1.1%
Asian	1,270	1.8%
Native Hawaiian and Other Pacific Islander	52	0.1%
Some other race	23,353	32.5%
Two or more races	8,716	12.1%
Hispanic or Latino (of any race)	37,912	52.8%

=== 2010 census ===
Demographic profile	1950	1970	1990	2010
White	85.9%	59.8%	19.0%	17.6%
—Non-Hispanic	N/A	52.9%	14.4%	4.9%
Black or African American	14.0%	39.1%	56.4%	48.1%
Hispanic or Latino (of any race)	N/A	7.6%	31.2%	47.0%
Asian	—	0.2%	1.3%	2.1%

The 2010 United States census counted 77,344 people, 24,475 households, and 16,912 families in the city. The population density was 8,669.6 per square mile (3,347.4/km^{2}). There were 28,358 housing units at an average density of 3,178.7 per square mile (1,227.3/km^{2}). The racial makeup was 17.59% (13,602) White, 48.07% (37,180) Black or African American, 0.76% (588) Native American, 2.12% (1,637) Asian, 0.06% (48) Pacific Islander, 27.57% (21,323) from other races, and 3.83% (2,966) from two or more races. Hispanic or Latino of any race were 47.04% (36,379) of the population. The Hispanic population of 36,379 was the tenth-highest of any municipality in New Jersey and the proportion of 47.0% was the state's 16th-highest percentage. The Puerto Rican population was 30.7%.

Of the 24,475 households, 37.9% had children under the age of 18; 22.3% were married couples living together; 37.9% had a female householder with no husband present and 30.9% were non-families. Of all households, 24.8% were made up of individuals and 7.4% had someone living alone who was 65 years of age or older. The average household size was 3.02 and the average family size was 3.56.

31.0% of the population were under the age of 18, 13.1% from 18 to 24, 28.0% from 25 to 44, 20.3% from 45 to 64, and 7.6% who were 65 years of age or older. The median age was 28.5 years. For every 100 females, the population had 94.7 males. For every 100 females ages 18 and older there were 91.0 males.

The city of Camden was 47% Hispanic of any race, 44% non-Hispanic black, 6% non-Hispanic white, and 3% other. Camden is predominately populated by African Americans and Puerto Ricans.

The Census Bureau's 2006–2010 American Community Survey showed that (in 2010 inflation-adjusted dollars) median household income was $27,027 (with a margin of error of +/− $912) and the median family income was $29,118 (+/− $1,296). Males had a median income of $27,987 (+/− $1,840) versus $26,624 (+/− $1,155) for females. The per capita income for the city was $12,807 (+/− $429). About 33.5% of families and 36.1% of the population were below the poverty line, including 50.3% of those under age 18 and 26.2% of those age 65 or over.

As of 2006, 52% of the city's residents lived in poverty, one of the highest rates in the nation. The city had a median household income of $18,007, the lowest of all U.S. communities with populations of more than 65,000 residents. A group of poor Camden residents were the subject of a 20/20 special on poverty in America broadcast on January 26, 2007, in which Diane Sawyer profiled the lives of three young children growing up in Camden. A follow-up was shown on November 9, 2007.

In 2011, Camden's unemployment rate was 19.6%, compared with 10.6% in Camden County as a whole. As of 2009, the unemployment rate in Camden was 19.2%, compared to the 10% overall unemployment rate for Burlington, Camden and Gloucester counties and a rate of 8.4% in Philadelphia and the four surrounding counties in Southeastern Pennsylvania.

== Points of interest ==
- Corinne's Place is a Black-owned soul food restaurant located in Camden, New Jersey. Corinne Bradley-Powers opened the restaurant on Haddon Avenue in 1989.
- Adventure Aquarium – Originally opened in 1992, it re-opened in its current form in May 2005 featuring about 8,000 animals living in varied forms of semi-aquatic, freshwater and marine habitats. The Adventure aquarium is also the only aquarium in the world that houses hippopotamuses.
- Waterfront Music Pavilion – An outdoor amphitheater/indoor theater complex with a seating capacity of 25,000. Formerly known as the Susquehanna Bank Center.
- Battleship New Jersey Museum and Memorial – Opened in October 2001, providing access to the battleship USS New Jersey that had been towed to the Camden area for restoration in 1999.
- Harleigh Cemetery – Established in 1885, the cemetery is the burial site of Walt Whitman, several Congressmen and many other South Jersey notables.
- Walt Whitman House
- National Register of Historic Places listings in Camden County, New Jersey

== In popular culture ==
The fictional Camden mayor Carmine Polito in the 2013 film American Hustle is loosely based on 1970s Camden mayor Angelo Errichetti.

The 1995 film 12 Monkeys contains scenes on Camden's Admiral Wilson Boulevard.

== Notable people ==
=== Actors and actresses ===
- Christine Andreas (born 1951), Broadway actress and singer
- James Cardwell (1921–1954), actor, The Fighting Sullivans
- Joanna Cassidy (born 1944), actress
- Jimmy Conlin (1884–1962), character actor
- Khris Davis (born 1987), actor
- Chas. Floyd Johnson (born 1941), television producer and actor, The Rockford Files, Magnum, P.I. and Red Tails
- Ben Leonberg (born 1987), film director, screenwriter and producer, known for his work in the horror and fantasy genres
- Edward Lewis (1919–2019), film producer and writer, Spartacus and for his collaborations with John Frankenheimer, producing or executive producing nine films together
- Ann Pennington (1893–1971), Broadway actress, dancer and singer, Ziegfeld Follies and George White's Scandals
- Jim Perry (1933–2015), television game show host, singer, announcer and performer
- Tasha Smith (born 1969), actress, director and producer, Boston Common

=== Architects and artists ===
- Vernon Howe Bailey (1874–1953), artist
- Stephen Decatur Button (1813–1897), architect
- Alex Da Corte (born 1980), visual artist
- Frank De Martini (1952–2001), architect and 9/11 first responder
- Jona Frank (born 1966), portrait photographer and author, Cherry Hill; A Childhood Reimagined
- Mickalene Thomas (born 1970), artist

=== Athletes ===
- Max Alexander (born 1981), boxer
- Rashad Baker (born 1982), professional football safety, Buffalo Bills, Minnesota Vikings, New England Patriots and Oakland Raiders
- Martin V. Bergen (1872–1941), college football coach
- Art Best (1953–2014), football running back who played three seasons in the National Football League with the Chicago Bears and New York Giants
- Audrey Bleiler (1933–1975), infielder who played in All-American Girls Professional Baseball League for 1951–1952 South Bend Blue Sox champion teams
- Fran Brown (born 1982), head coach of the Syracuse Orange football team
- Jordan Burroughs (born 1988), Olympic champion in freestyle wrestling who won Gold at the London Olympics in 2012
- Sean Chandler (born 1996), safety for the New York Giants of the National Football League
- Frank Chapot (1932–2016), Olympic silver medalist equestrian
- Duce Chestnut, American football cornerback for the Syracuse Orange
- James A. Corea (1937–2001), radio personality and specialist in nutrition, rehabilitation and sports medicine
- Joseph W. Cowgill (1908–1986), politician who served as the Minority Leader of the New Jersey Senate
- Donovin Darius (born 1975), professional football player for Jacksonville Jaguars
- Rachel Dawson (born 1985), field hockey midfielder
- Fadil Diggs, college football defensive lineman for the Syracuse Orange football team
- Rawly Eastwick (born 1950), Major League Baseball pitcher who won two games in 1975 World Series
- Shaun T. Fitness (born 1978), motivational speaker, fitness trainer and choreographer best known for his home fitness programs T25, Insanity and Hip-Hop Abs
- Rasheer Fleming (born 2004), basketball player who plays for the Saint Joseph's Hawks
- Sean Golden (born 1983), former artistic gymnast and member of the United States men's national artistic gymnastics team
- Jamaal Green (born 1980), American football defensive end who played in the NFL for the Philadelphia Eagles, Chicago Bears and the Washington Redskins
- Dara Greig (born 2000), professional i.e. hockey player for the Montreal Victoire of the Professional Women's Hockey League
- Brad Hawkins (born 1998), American football safety, who played for the New England Patriots of the National Football League
- George Hegamin (born 1973), offensive lineman who played for NFL's Dallas Cowboys, Philadelphia Eagles and Tampa Bay Buccaneers
- Zach Hicks (born 2003), basketball player for the Boston Celtics
- Harry Higgs (born 1991), professional golfer
- Andy Hinson (born c. 1931), retired American football head coach of the Bethune–Cookman University Wildcats football team from 1976 to 1978 and of the Cheyney University of Pennsylvania Wolves from 1979 to 1984
- Steve Hoffman (born 1958), senior assistant for special teams for the Atlanta Falcons
- Kenny Jackson (born 1962), former wide receiver for the Philadelphia Eagles and co-owner of Kenny's Korner Deli
- Sig Jakucki (1909–1979), former Major League pitcher for the St. Louis Browns, whose victory over the New York Yankees in the final game of the 1944 season gave the Browns their only pennant
- Jaryd Jones-Smith (born 1995), American football offensive tackle for the Las Vegas Raiders of the NFL
- Leon Lucas (1901–1971), boxer who competed in the 1928 Summer Olympics, turned professional and went on to found Donkey's Place, a sandwich shop which is well known for its cheesesteak
- Harry Miller (1858–1919), Major League Baseball pitcher who appeared in a single came in 1884, giving up 19 runs
- Mike Moriarty (born 1974), former Major League infielder for the Baltimore Orioles
- Ray Narleski (1928–2012), baseball player with Cleveland Indians and Detroit Tigers
- Harvey Pollack (1922–2015), director of statistical information for the Philadelphia 76ers, who at the time of his death was the only person still working for the NBA since its inaugural 1946–1947 season
- Dwight Muhammad Qawi (born 1953), boxing world light-heavyweight and cruiserweight champion, International Boxing Hall of Famer known as the "Camden Buzzaw"
- Haason Reddick (born 1994), linebacker for the Philadelphia Eagles of the National Football League
- Buddy Rogers (1921–1992), professional wrestler, NWA World Heavyweight Champion and inaugural WWWF World Heavyweight Champion
- Mike Rozier (born 1961), collegiate and professional football running back who won Heisman Trophy in 1983
- Anisse Saidi (born 2008), soccer player
- George Savitsky (1924–2012), offensive tackle who played in the National Football League for the Philadelphia Eagles
- Art Still (born 1955), collegiate and professional football defensive end and cousin to Devon Still
- Devon Still (born 1989), collegiate and professional football defensive end
- Billy Thompson (born 1963), college and professional basketball player who played for the Los Angeles Lakers and Miami Heat
- Sheena Tosta (born 1982), hurdler, Olympic silver medalist 2008
- Frank Townsend (1933–1965), professional wrestler and musician
- Dajuan Wagner (born 1983), professional basketball player for the Cleveland Cavaliers and Polish team Prokom Trefl Sopot
- Jersey Joe Walcott (1914–1994), boxing world heavyweight champion, International Boxing Hall of Famer
- Darrell Wilson (born 1958), American football coach who is the defensive coordinator for the Wagner Seahawks football team
- Bo Wood (born 1945), former American football player and high school coach, who played in the NFL for the Atlanta Falcons

=== Authors, poets and writers ===
- Betty Cavanna (1909–2001), author, teen romance novels, mysteries and children's books
- Mary Chalmers (born 1927, class of 1944), author and illustrator who wrote children's books frequently featuring cats
- David Aaron Clark (1960–2009), author, musician, pornographic actor and pornographic video director
- Andrew Clements (1949–2019), writer of children's books, known for his debut novel Frindle
- Andrea Dworkin (1946–2015), radical feminist leader, who criticised pornography and was a victim of forced prostitution
- Michael Lisicky (born 1964), non-fiction writer and oboist with the Baltimore Symphony Orchestra
- Nick Virgilio (1928–1989), haiku poet
- Walt Whitman (1819–1892), essayist, journalist and poet

=== Military ===
- Joe Angelo (1896–1978), U.S. Army veteran of World War I and recipient of the Distinguished Service Cross
- Boston Corbett (1832–1894), Union Army soldier who killed John Wilkes Booth
- Steven Ferrari (born 1962), career United States Army officer who retired as a major general
- Joseph C. Strasser (1940–2019), rear admiral of the United States Navy who served a tour as President of the Naval War College
- Howard Unruh (1921–2009), World War II veteran and 1949 mass murderer
- John P. Van Leer (1825–1862), Union Army officer

=== Musicians ===
- Graham Alexander (born 1989), singer-songwriter, entertainer and entrepreneur, Rain: A Tribute to the Beatles and Let It Be and founder, of Victor Talking Machine Co.
- Butch Ballard (1918–2011), jazz drummer who performed with Louis Armstrong, Count Basie and Duke Ellington
- Paul Baloche (born 1962), Christian music artist, worship leader, and singer-songwriter
- Carla L. Benson, vocalist
- Cindy Birdsong (born 1939), vocalist, The Supremes
- Nelson Boyd (1928–1985), jazz bassist
- Vedra Chandler (born 1980), singer and dancer
- Russ Columbo (1908–1934), baritone, songwriter, violinist and actor
- Buddy DeFranco (1923–2014), jazz clarinetist
- Sam Dockery (1929–2015), hard bop pianist
- Wayne Dockery (1941–2018), jazz double bassist
- Nick Douglas (born 1967), musician
- Lola Falana (born 1942), singer and dancer
- Billy Gallagher (c. 1869–1934), businessman and restaurant owner
- Heather Henderson (born 1973), singer, model, podcaster, actress and Dance Party USA performer
- Richard "Groove" Holmes (1931–1991), jazz organist
- Leon Huff (born 1942), songwriter and record producer
- Barbara Ingram (1947–1994), R&B background singer
- Eric Lewis (born 1973), pianist popularly known as ELEW
- Jimmy Lyon (1921–1984), jazz pianist
- Ronny J (born 1992), record producer, rapper and singer
- Anna Sosenko (1909–2000), songwriter and manager
- Jade Starling (born c. 1964), singer-songwriter who was the lead vocalist for 1980s band Pretty Poison
- Richard Sterban (born 1943), bass singer for the Oak Ridge Boys
- Frank Tiberi (born 1928), band leader, Woody Herman Orchestra
- Tye Tribbett (born 1976), gospel music singer, songwriter, keyboardist and choir director
- Julia Udine (born 1993), singer and actress, Christine Daaé in The Phantom of the Opera on Broadway
- Jack Vees (born 1955), composer and bassist
- Crystal Waters (born 1967), house and dance music singer and songwriter, "Gypsy Woman" and "100% Pure Love"
- Buster Williams (born 1942), jazz bassist

=== Politicians and public officials ===
- John F. Amodeo (born 1950), politician who served in the New Jersey General Assembly, where he represented the 2nd Legislative District from 2008 to 2014
- Rob Andrews (born 1957), U.S. representative for New Jersey's 1st congressional district, served 1990–2014
- David Baird Jr. (1881–1955), U.S. Senator from 1929 to 1930, unsuccessful Republican nominee for governor in 1931
- David Baird Sr. (1839–1927), United States Senator from New Jersey
- Arthur Barclay (born 1982), politician currently serving on the Camden City Council. Formerly represented the 5th Legislative District in the New Jersey General Assembly from 2016 to 2018
- U. E. Baughman (1905–1978), head of United States Secret Service from 1948 to 1961
- William J. Browning (1850–1920), represented New Jersey's 1st congressional district in U.S. House of Representatives, 1911–1920
- William T. Cahill (1912–1996), politician who served six terms in the U.S. House of Representatives (1958–1970) and as Governor of New Jersey (1971–1975)
- Bonnie Watson Coleman (born 1945), politician who has served as the U.S. representative for New Jersey's 12th congressional district since 2015
- Mary Keating Croce (1928–2016), politician who served in the New Jersey General Assembly for three two-year terms, from 1974 to 1980, before serving as the Chairwoman of the New Jersey State Parole Board in the 1990s
- Lawrence Curry (1936–2018), educator and politician who served in the Pennsylvania House of Representatives from 1993 to 2012, was born in Camden
- Michellene Davis, lawyer and executive who served as acting State Treasurer of New Jersey
- James Dellet (1788–1848), politician and a member of the United States House of Representatives from Alabama
- Thomas P. Foy (1951–2004), attorney and politician who served in both houses of the New Jersey Legislature representing the 7th Legislative District
- Angel Fuentes (born 1961), former Assmblyman who has served as President of the Camden city council
- Carmen M. Garcia, former Chief judge of Municipal Court in Trenton
- Oz Griebel (1949–2020), banker, lawyer and political candidate who ran for Governor of Connecticut
- John J. Horn (1917–1999), labor leader and politician who served in both houses of the New Jersey Legislature before being nominated to serve as commissioner of the New Jersey Department of Labor and Industry
- Robert S. MacAlister (1897–1957), Los Angeles City Council member, 1934–1939
- Richard Mroz, president of the New Jersey Board of Public Utilities from 2014 to 2018
- George F. Neutze (1908–1969), politician who represented Camden County in the New Jersey General Assembly
- Donald Norcross (born 1958), U.S. Congressman representing New Jersey's 1st congressional district
- Christine O'Hearn (born 1969), lawyer serving as a United States district judge of the United States District Court for the District of New Jersey
- Francis F. Patterson Jr. (1867–1935), represented New Jersey's 1st congressional district in U.S. House of Representatives, 1920–1927
- William T. Read (1878–1954), lawyer, who was President of the New Jersey Senate and Treasurer of New Jersey
- William Spearman (born 1958), politician who has represented the 5th Legislative District in the New Jersey General Assembly since 2018
- John F. Starr (1818–1904), represented New Jersey's 1st congressional district in U.S. House of Representatives, 1863–1867
- Charles A. Wolverton (1880–1969), politician who represented New Jersey's 1st congressional district in the United States House of Representatives from 1927 to 1959

=== Other ===
- Mary Ellen Avery (1927–2011), pediatrician whose research led to development of successful treatment for Infant respiratory distress syndrome
- Quaesita Cromwell Drake (1889–1967), chemist who was a professor and chair of the chemistry department at the University of Delaware for 38 years
- Joe Epperson (1945–2025), camera operator and cinematographer who was nominated for three Primetime Emmy Awards
- Margaret Giannini (1921–2021), physician and specialist in assistive technology and rehabilitation, who was the first director of the National Institute of Disability Rehabilitation Research
- Elie Honig (born 1975), attorney and CNN senior legal analyst
- Richard Hollingshead (1900–1975), inventor of the drive-in theater
- Aaron McCargo Jr. (born 1971), chef and television personality who hosts Big Daddy's House, a cooking show on Food Network
- Lucy Taxis Shoe Meritt (1906–2003), classical archaeologist and a scholar of Greek architectural ornamentation and mouldings
- Newton Morton (1929–2018), population geneticist
- Thomas J. Osler (1940–2023), mathematician, former national champion distance runner and author
- Jim Perry (1933–2015), game show host and television personality
- Dorcas Reilly (1926–2018), chef, homemaker and inventor, best known for popularizing the green bean casserole
- Tommy Roberts (1928–2024), radio and TV broadcaster who launched simulcast in 1984, a television feed of horse races to racetracks, casinos and off-track betting facilities, enabling gamblers to watch and bet on live racing from all over the world
- Richard Valeriani (1932–2018), former White House correspondent and diplomatic correspondent with NBC News in the 1960s and 1970s
- Barbara Walden (born 1930), actress, dancer and businesswoman who founded one of the first American cosmetic companies offering products for Black women to be sold in major department stores
- Mary Schenck Woolman (1860–1940), pioneer in vocational education for women
- Phil Zimmermann (born 1954), programmer who developed the Pretty Good Privacy method of data encryption

Preceded by Pennsauken Township	Bordering communities of Philadelphia	Succeeded by Gloucester City
