= Beideman, Camden =

Populated place in Camden County, New Jersey, US

Beideman
- Neighborhood
- Interactive map of Beideman
- Country: United States
- State: New Jersey
- County: Camden
- City: Camden
- Area code: 856

Beideman is a neighborhood name in the East Camden section of the City of Camden, New Jersey. According to the 2000 U.S. census, Beideman has a population of 5,677.

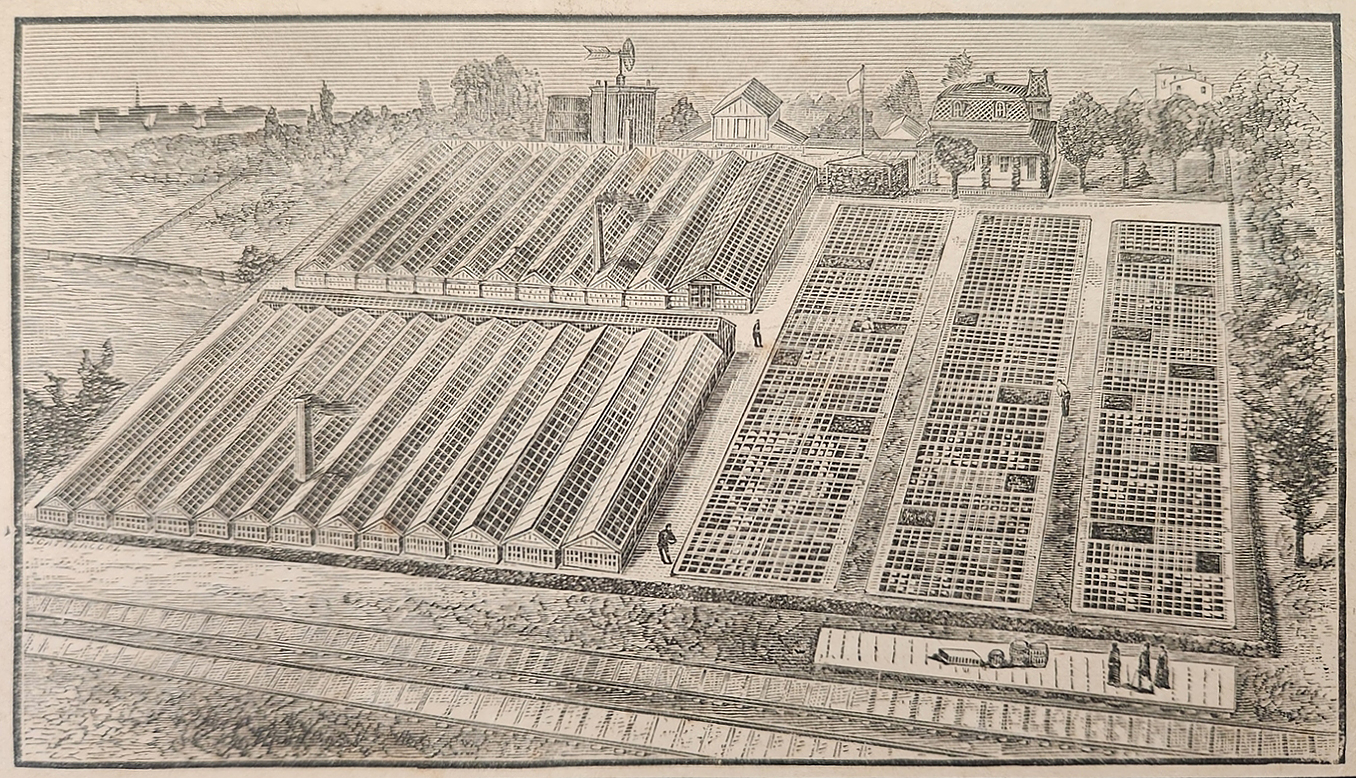
Reverse of an 1876 advertising card for "Mabbett & Wiles, General brokers and commission merchants, No. 1 Dock Street Market, Philadelphia". It is described on the obverse as "Bird's eve view, Green houses and truck farm of Mabbett & Wiles. Located at Beideman Station, three miles from Market St. Ferry, Phila, On P.R.R. C.&A. Division".

The neighborhood name Beideman originates from a prominent family that lived there, with several notable members including Benjamin C. Beideman and Horace B. Beideman. The name Beideman has been frequently misspelled as "Biedman" or "Biedeman". The East Camden neighborhoods of Beideman and Pavonia are also considered part of the neighborhood of Cramer Hill.

The area was served by Beideman Station, on the Pennsylvania Railroad's Camden and Amboy line.
