= Stockton, Camden =

Populated place in Camden County, New Jersey, US

Coordinates: 39.94417°N 75.077176°W

Stockton
- Neighborhood of Camden
- Interactive map of Stockton
- Country: United States
- State: New Jersey
- County: Camden
- City: Camden
- Incorporated: February 23, 1859 (as township)
- Incorporated: May 1, 1894 (as town)
- Annexed: March 24, 1899
- Area code: 856

Stockton is a neighborhood and former municipality in Camden, in the U.S. state of New Jersey. It has a population of 6,479.

Stockton was incorporated as a township by an act of the New Jersey Legislature on February 23, 1859, from portions of Delaware Township (now Cherry Hill). Portions of the township were taken to form Merchantville on March 3, 1874, and Pennsauken Township on February 18, 1892. Based on the results of a referendum that passed on March 22, 1894, Stockton was reincorporated as a town as of May 1, 1894. On March 24, 1899, Stockton was annexed by the City of Camden.
