= West Jersey Colored Orphanage =

Orphanage in Camden, New Jersey, U.S. (1874-1920)

- Successor: Camden Home for Friendless Children
- Established: 1874; 152 years ago
- Founders: John Cooper, Mary Cooper, and Joesph M. Kaighn
- Founded at: Camden
- Defunct: 1920; 106 years ago
- Type: Orphanage
- Region served: Camden, NJ, Philadelphia
- Key people: Mary Lindley Murray, James McCune Smith
- Affiliations: Camden Home for Friendless Children
- Funding: Donations

The West Jersey Colored Orphanage was an orphanage that operated from 1874 to the early 1920s. It operated at the corner of 6th and Mechanic Street in the Bergen Square neighborhood of Camden, New Jersey. It was replaced in the early 1920s by the Hunton Branch YMCA (later South Camden YMCA).

== History and description ==
=== Property's early history ===
The building that became the West Jersey Colored Orphanage was originally a two-story farmhouse built c.1820 by Joseph M. Kaighn (a member of the prominent Kaighn family). He and his family lived at this 1.5 acre estate for several years before converting it into some type of unregistered charitable house at an unknown date. There are no known photos of the house in its original capacity at this time.

=== Founding ===
The West Jersey Colored Orphanage was founded by the Society of Friends whose members included the prominent members of Camden high society such John Cooper and Mary Cooper (members of the prominent Cooper family). It was found because the Camden Home for Friendless Children, which was founded in 1865 to house orphans of the Civil War, was segregated and would not allow for the admission of black children. The Society of Friends decided to create an orphanage whose intent was to house orphaned black children. Planning for the new orphanage began in the winter of 1873–74. They originally planned on starting the new orphanage at a different address a few streets over at Oak and Chestnut with a donation of three lots owned by Joseph M. Kaighn. The orphanage received its charter on February 17, 1874. The old brick farmhouse at 6th and Mechanic St. was sold to the Society of Friends on November 21, 1874. The group decided that the farmhouse and surrounding lot would instead be the new home of the West Jersey Colored Orphanage. Prior to the opening, the building underwent some minor repairs and upgrades. On January 20, 1875, the new location at 6th and Mechanic received its first fosters. From its opening, its operation was paid for through voluntary donations of money and other merchandise.

=== Operating history: (1874–1920s) ===
The orphanage's objective was to "afford a home for the destitute colored children of our own and neighboring counties, giving them the rudiments of a simple education, and training them to habits of order and industry, and at a suitable age they are indentured to respectable families, in the country, if possible.". The orphanage claimed that it provided many benefits to the children, claiming that "after being indentured, are marked for their good deportment and, truthfulness and ability to be useful.". Throughout its operations, the orphanage typically cared after around twenty children on average at most times. In 1883, the current board of trustees for orphanage were: president - Howard M. Cooper of Camden, first vice president - Dr. G.W. Bailey of Wenonah, second vice president - Daniel Thackara of Woodbury, secretary and treasurer - Alex C. Wood of Camden, solicitor - Howard M. Cooper of Camden, Joseph M. Kaighn of Camden, William Bettle Jr. of Camden, John Cooper of Camden, Joseph M. Cooper of Camden, George K. Johnson Jr. of Camden, Augustus Reeve of Camden, Richard H. Reeve of Camden, William B. Cooper of Camden, John Gill Jr. of Haddonfield, Edward D. Barker of Camden (308 Penn St.), William J. Evans of Marlton, Edward L. Farr of Camden, William J. Cooper of Camden, Thomas W. Synnott of Wenonah, Dr. Wallace McGeorge of Woodbury. Howard M. Cooper continued to be the president of the board of trustees throughout the 1890s.

In a newspaper article in the Courier Post, the property is described as "an old fashioned two story brick farmhouse, surrounded by spacious grounds and a few beautiful shade trees...". In another article by the Camden Democrat, it is described as "covers one square ground running from Liberty to Mechanic and Sixth to Seventh streets. The house, a well aired country manor being in the centre.". As Camden grew in the latter half of the 19th century, the orphanage was able to sell a portion of their 1.5 acre parcel to an unknown developer for homes, possibly the Kaighn family themselves as they were involved in construction residential real estate at the time building rowhomes throughout the city, most likely intended to house the workers of factories in the surrounding area. Several factories and businesses would open up in the coming years as the area became more industrial. It is unknown the parcel was subdivided but by 1891 it had already been sold of. Assumed that the proceeds would have gone to the orphanage's continued operations. According to a fire map from 1891, the orphanage had three buildings on their lot including the orphanage (modified farmhouse), a schoolhouse, and another outbuilding of unknown use. The schoolhouse was built on the land surrounding the orphanage, right behind to be specific, though it is unknown when it was exactly built. In 1897, the new addition to the orphanage had started, with an article in the Courier Post saying, "Contractor F.W. Fawcett has the extensive addition to the West Jersey Colored Orphanage.". In 1898, the Orphanage took an ad out in the Camden Democrat, asking for donations. In this ad, they say that "the new building just completed more than doubles the capacity of the orphanage, and provides for isolation and proper treatment of the sick, a necessity if any of the children should be attacked with a contagious disease. The new dormitories also make separate beds for children possible, a condition which did not exist before.". As of 1906, those three remained the only buildings on the lot. As of 1898, Howard M. Cooper was still the president of the board of trustees.

The West Jersey Orphanage would close its doors in the early 1920s when it was absorbed into the Camden Home for Friendless Children, as it was no longer segregated, with all the remaining children at 6th and Mechanic being moved there. The Camden Home for Friendless Children would ultimately close its doors for good in 1979. The orphanage building (modified farmhouse) then housed the Hunton Branch of the YMCA (later called the South Camden YMCA). The original building (modified farmhouse) was demolished between 1957 and 1963 as they had constructed a new, larger facility on the property in 1950.

==== Life for the children ====
Life was said to be good at the West Jersey Colored Orphanage. Though, it was until 1898 would the children get their own own beds. There would often be events held for the entertainment of the children such as vaudeville shows. The children would often also go on day trips, with the Jersey Shore being a popular one amongst them.

== Operating practices ==
The orphanage refused those children who were seen as having mental or physical disabilities with only few exceptions that were only temporary at that. This refusal to help the disabled was pretty typical for the time as orphaned children with disabilities, both mental and physical, would often be put into a school fitting their disability if there was one that would accept them or sent state-run asylums. There is no information as to if these policies changed during the orphanage's operation.
