= Whitman Park, Camden =

Populated place in Camden County, New Jersey, US

Coordinates: 39.923168°N 75.099075°W

Whitman Park
- Neighborhood of Camden
- Interactive map of Whitman Park
- Country: United States
- State: New Jersey
- County: Camden
- City: Camden
- Area code: 856

Whitman Park is a neighbourhood in Camden, New Jersey. Located north of Woodlynne, Whitman Park has a population of 6,981.

Whitman Park is a crime and drug-infested neighborhood. However, businesses have started to move into Whitman Park in recent years. Due to high crime and murder rates, police have installed gunshot-recording microphones in Whitman Park. In 2015, the city of Camden submitted a redevelopment plan for the neighborhood. It is home to a substantial Polish American community, centered around the St. Joseph's Church.
