= Cramer Hill, Camden =

Populated place in Camden County, New Jersey, US

Coordinates: 39.953322°N 75.099075°W

Cramer Hill
- Neighborhood of Camden
- Interactive map of Cramer Hill
- Country: United States
- State: New Jersey
- County: Camden
- City: Camden
- Area code: 856

Cramer Hill is a neighborhood in the East Camden section of the City of Camden, New Jersey. Cramer Hill (and the entire section of East Camden) was formed upon the annexation of Stockton town by the City of Camden on March 24, 1899. In the early days of East Camden, Cramer Hill was one of several constituent neighborhood names that included Pavonia, Beideman, Stockton, Rosedale, and Marlton. The Pavonia name has become obsolete; Beideman was once known as "North Cramer Hill". The boundaries of Cramer Hill are sometimes considered to be State Street to the south, the Pavonia Railroad Yard and railroad lines to the east, 36th Street (also the border with Pennsauken Township) to the north, and the Delaware River to the west. Cramer Hill is located in the northeastern section of Camden. The primary road running through Cramer Hill is River Road, which runs southwest to northeast. River Road is a county road known as CR 543. According to the 2000 U.S. census, the neighborhood has a population of 4,358.

The 36th Street station of the River Line light rail system is located at the northern end of the neighborhood.

The 35-acre (14 ha) Cramer Hill Nature Preserve opened in 2019 and is connected to Petty Island by a bridge at 36th Street.
