= Camden Children's Garden =

Coordinates: 39.9445°N 75.130°W

The Camden Children's Garden is operated by the Camden City Garden Club, Inc and is located on the Camden Waterfront, across from downtown Philadelphia.

== History ==
This venue was created in 1999 and is designed for children and families.

== Facilities ==
This 4.5-acre (1.8 ha) garden features a variety of themed educational exhibits for children for creative and imaginative play, such as the Dinosaur Garden, a Giant Picnic Garden, Storybook Gardens, Red Oak Run and Tree House, and Cityscapes Garden. The facility includes indoor attractions such as the Philadelphia Eagles Four Seasons Butterfly House, Plaza de Aibonito, a Puerto Rican tropical greenhouse exhibit, and Benjamin Franklin’s Secret Garden and Workshop. Many exhibits and gardens were original displays in the Philadelphia Flower Show and come back to the Camden Children's Garden to find a permanent home. There are three amusement rides: Carousel, Arrow River Express Train Ride, and Spring Butterfly Ride. The Garden is closed January and February. Garden Festivals are family-oriented special events held at the Garden on the second and fourth weekends of the month, from April through November. The Garden also hosts the Annual Holiday Festival of Lights through December. Educational Programs are offered by the Camden Children's Garden, both on-site and through distance-learning (via video conferencing). More than 30 lessons are offered on various topics, tailored by grade level aligned to State Education Standards.
