= Ocean View =

Ocean View may refer to:

== Places ==
- Ocean View, New Zealand, New Zealand
- Ocean View, Cape Town, South Africa

=== Australia ===
- Ocean View, Queensland
- Torquay, Tasmania
- Ocean View, Victoria

=== United States ===
- Albany, California, previously named Ocean View
- West Berkeley, Berkeley, California, previously named Ocean View
- Ocean View, San Francisco, California, a neighborhood
- Ocean View, Delaware
- Ocean View, New Jersey
- Ocean View, Virginia, a coastal region in Norfolk, Virginia
- Ocean View, Hawaii

== Other uses ==
- Ocean View (Vietnam), a U.S. Marine Corps observation post in South Vietnam during the Vietnam War
- Ocean View Amusement Park, a former amusement in Norfolk, Virginia (USA)
- Ocean View High School, in Huntington Beach, California (USA)
- Ocean View Line, San Francisco, California (USA)
- Zanzibar Ocean View F.C., a football club in Tanzania
