= Peniston =

Peniston (and spelling variants) may refer to:

== People ==
=== Peniston ===
Surname

- CeCe Peniston (born 1969), American dance music singer
- Cherylin Peniston (born 1948), legislator in the U.S. state of Colorado
- James Peniston (born 1973), American sculptor
- Jared Peniston (born 1982), Bermudian football player
- Robert C. Peniston (1922–2014), former captain of the battleship USS New Jersey
- Ryan Peniston (born 1995), British tennis player

Given name

- Peniston Booth (1691–1765), 18th-century Anglican priest
- Peniston Lamb, 1st Viscount Melbourne (1745–1828), British politician
  - His son Peniston Lamb (1770–1805), also a British politician
- Peniston Powney (c. 1699–1757), British landowner and politician
  - His son Peniston Portlock Powney (1743–1794), also a British politician

=== Penniston ===
- S. Dell Penniston, American farmer and politician
- Thomas Penniston, early 18th century privateer

=== Penyston ===
- Sir Thomas Penyston, 1st Baronet, English MP

== See also ==
- Penistone, small town in South Yorkshire, England
