= USS New Jersey (BB-62) =

United States battleship and now museum ship

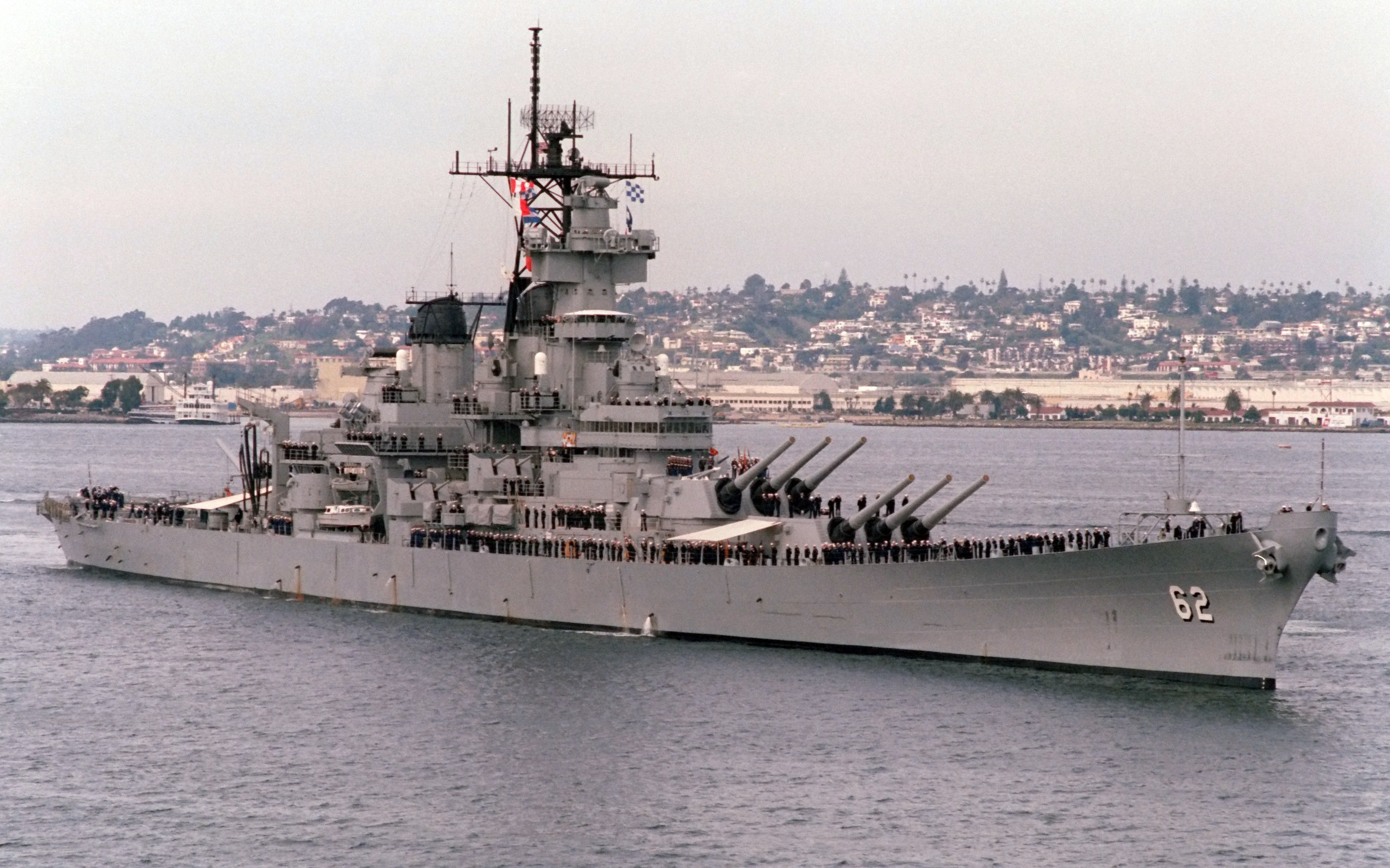
- USS New Jersey underway in January 1985

History

United States
- Namesake: State of New Jersey
- Ordered: 1 July 1939
- Builder: Philadelphia Naval Shipyard
- Laid down: 16 September 1940
- Launched: 7 December 1942
- Sponsored by: Carolyn Edison
- Commissioned: 23 May 1943
- Decommissioned: 30 June 1948
- Recommissioned: 21 November 1950
- Decommissioned: 21 August 1957
- Recommissioned: 6 April 1968
- Decommissioned: 17 December 1969
- Recommissioned: 28 December 1982
- Decommissioned: 8 February 1991
- Stricken: 4 January 1999
- Identification: Callsign: NEPP; Hull number: BB-62
- Motto: "Firepower for Freedom"
- Nickname(s): "Big J", "Black Dragon"
- Honors and awards: 19 battle stars; Navy Unit Commendation
- Status: Museum ship
- Notes: Most decorated battleship in the history of the U.S. Navy
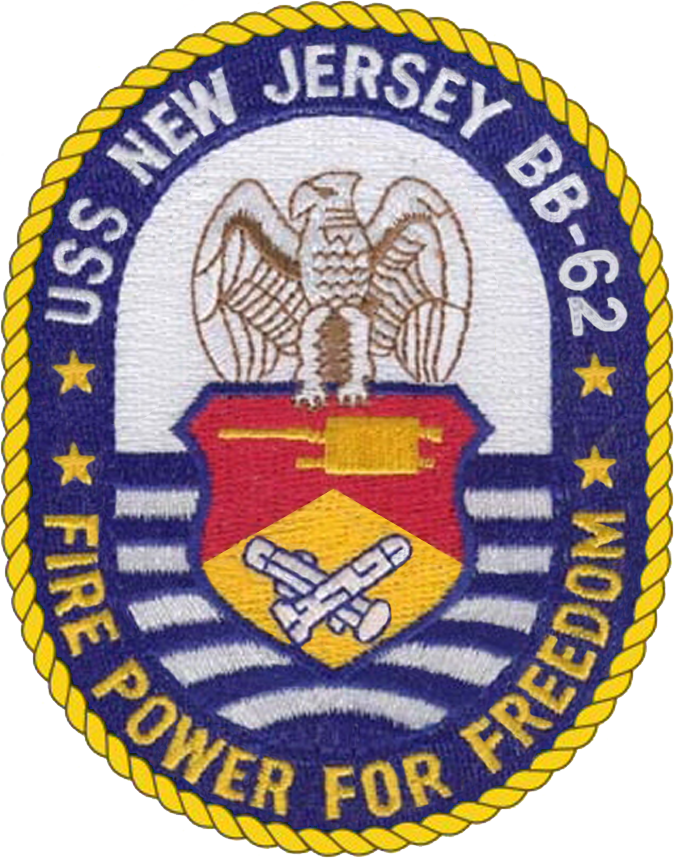
- Badge

General characteristics
- Class & type: Iowa-class battleship
- Displacement: 49,657 long tons (50,454 t) standard (1943); 58,132 long tons (59,065 t) full load (1943); 60,000 long tons (61,000 t) full load (1968)
- Length: 887 ft 7 in (270.54 m)
- Beam: 108 ft 1.375 in (32.95333 m)
- Draft: 37 ft 9 in (11.51 m) (full load) 41 ft 0 in (12.50 m) aft, 39 ft 0 in (11.89 m) forward (1968)
- Propulsion: 4 x 53,000 hp Westinghouse Electric Corporation steam turbines powered by 8 x 650 psi m-type boilers
- Speed: 33 knots (61 km/h)
- Complement: 1,921 officers and men
- Sensors & processing systems: AN/SPS-49 air search radar; AN/SPS-67 surface search radar; AN/SPQ-9 surface search/gun fire-control radar
- Electronic warfare & decoys: AN/SLQ-32; AN/SLQ-25 Nixie decoy system; 8 × Mark 36 SRBOC Super Rapid Bloom Rocket Launchers
- Armament: 1943: 9 × 16 in (406 mm) 50 cal. Mark 7 guns; 20 × 5 in (127 mm) 38 cal. Mark 12 guns; 80 × 40 mm 56 cal. antiaircraft (AA) guns; 49 × 20 mm 70 cal. AA guns; 1968: 9 × 16 in (406 mm) 50 cal Mark 7 guns; 20 × 5 in (127 mm) 38 cal Mark 12 guns; 1982: 9 × 16 in (406 mm) 50 cal. Mark 7 guns; 12 × 5 in (127 mm) 38 cal. Mark 12 guns; 32 × BGM-109 Tomahawk cruise missiles; 16 × RGM-84 Harpoon antiship missiles; 4 × 20 mm/76 cal. Phalanx CIWS
- Armor: Belt: 12.1 in (307 mm); Bulkheads: 11.3 in (287 mm); Barbettes: 11.6 to 17.3 in (295 to 439 mm); Turrets: 19.5 in (495 mm); Decks: main 1.5 in (38 mm); second 6.0 in (152 mm)
- Aircraft carried: 1943: 2 catapults; 3 Vought OS2U Kingfisher floatplanes; 1950s: Sikorsky H-5; 1968–1969: Gyrodyne QH-50 DASH drone; 1982: Deck for up to four helicopters but replaced with one RQ-2 Pioneer UAV

USS New Jersey (BB-62) is an Iowa-class battleship and the second ship of the United States Navy to be named after the U.S. state of New Jersey. She was often referred to as "Big J" or "Black Dragon". New Jersey earned more battle stars for combat actions than the other three completed Iowa-class battleships and was the only U.S. battleship used to provide gunfire support during the Vietnam War.

During World War II, New Jersey shelled targets on Guam and Okinawa and screened aircraft carriers conducting raids in the Marshall Islands. During the Korean War, she was involved in raids along the North Korean coast, after which she was decommissioned into the United States Navy reserve fleets, better known as the "mothball fleet". She was briefly reactivated in 1968 and sent to Vietnam to support U.S. troops before returning to the mothball fleet in 1969. Reactivated once more in the 1980s as part of the 600-ship Navy program, New Jersey was modernized to carry missiles and recommissioned for service. In 1983, she participated in U.S. operations during the Lebanese Civil War.

New Jersey was decommissioned for the last time in 1991 after having served a total of 21 years in the active fleet. During her career, she earned a Navy Unit Commendation for service in Vietnam, and 19 battle and campaign stars for combat operations during World War II, the Korean War, the Vietnam War, the Lebanese Civil War, and service in the Persian Gulf. After a brief retention in the mothball fleet, she was donated to the Home Port Alliance in Camden, New Jersey, and has served as a museum ship there since 15 October 2001.

== Construction ==
New Jersey was one of the Iowa-class "fast battleship" designs planned in 1938 by the Preliminary Design Branch at the Bureau of Construction and Repair. She was launched on 7 December 1942 (the first anniversary of the attack on Pearl Harbor) and commissioned on 23 May 1943. She was the second of the Iowa class to be commissioned by the U.S. Navy (USN). She was christened at her launching by Carolyn Edison, wife of Governor Charles Edison of New Jersey, himself a former secretary of the Navy, and commissioned at Philadelphia on 23 May 1943, Captain Carl F. Holden in command.

New Jersey's main battery consisted of nine 16"/50 caliber Mark 7 guns in three three-gun turrets, which could fire 2,700-pound (1,225 kg), armor-piercing shells some 23 miles (42.6 km). Her secondary battery consisted of twenty 5"/38 caliber guns mounted in twin-gun dual-purpose turrets, which could hit targets up to 9 miles (16.7 km) away. With the advent of air power and the need to gain and maintain air superiority came a need to protect the growing fleet of allied aircraft carriers, so New Jersey was fitted with an array of Oerlikon 20 mm and Bofors 40 mm antiaircraft (AA) guns. When reactivated in 1968, New Jersey had her 20 mm and 40 mm AA guns removed and was tailored for use as a heavy bombardment ship. When reactivated in 1982, New Jersey had four twin 5"/38 caliber DP mounts removed. She was outfitted with four Phalanx Close-In Weapon System mounts for protection against missiles and aircraft, and eight armored box launchers and four quad-cell launchers designed to fire Tomahawk and Harpoon missiles, respectively.

Her main deck was 53,000 square feet of teak. Unlike the other Iowa-class battleships, New Jersey was named by President Franklin D. Roosevelt to repay a political debt, to then-New Jersey Governor Charles Edison. During his time in the USN department, Edison pushed to build the Iowa ships and to build one at the Philadelphia Navy Yard, which secured votes for Roosevelt in Pennsylvania and New Jersey in the 1940 presidential election.

== World War II (1943–1945) ==
=== Shakedown and service with the 5th Fleet, Admiral Spruance ===
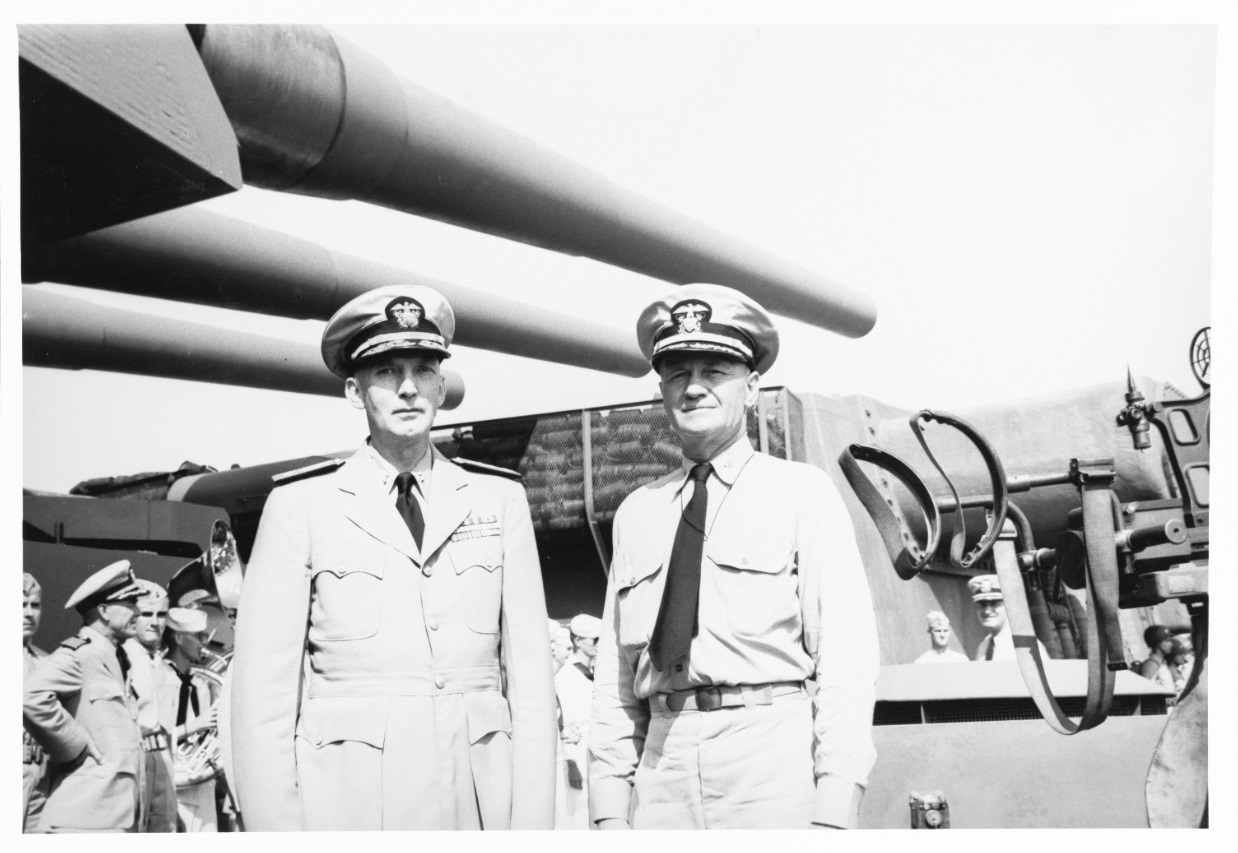
Captain Carl F. Holden (right) with Rear Admiral Donald B. Beary during inspection of New Jersey

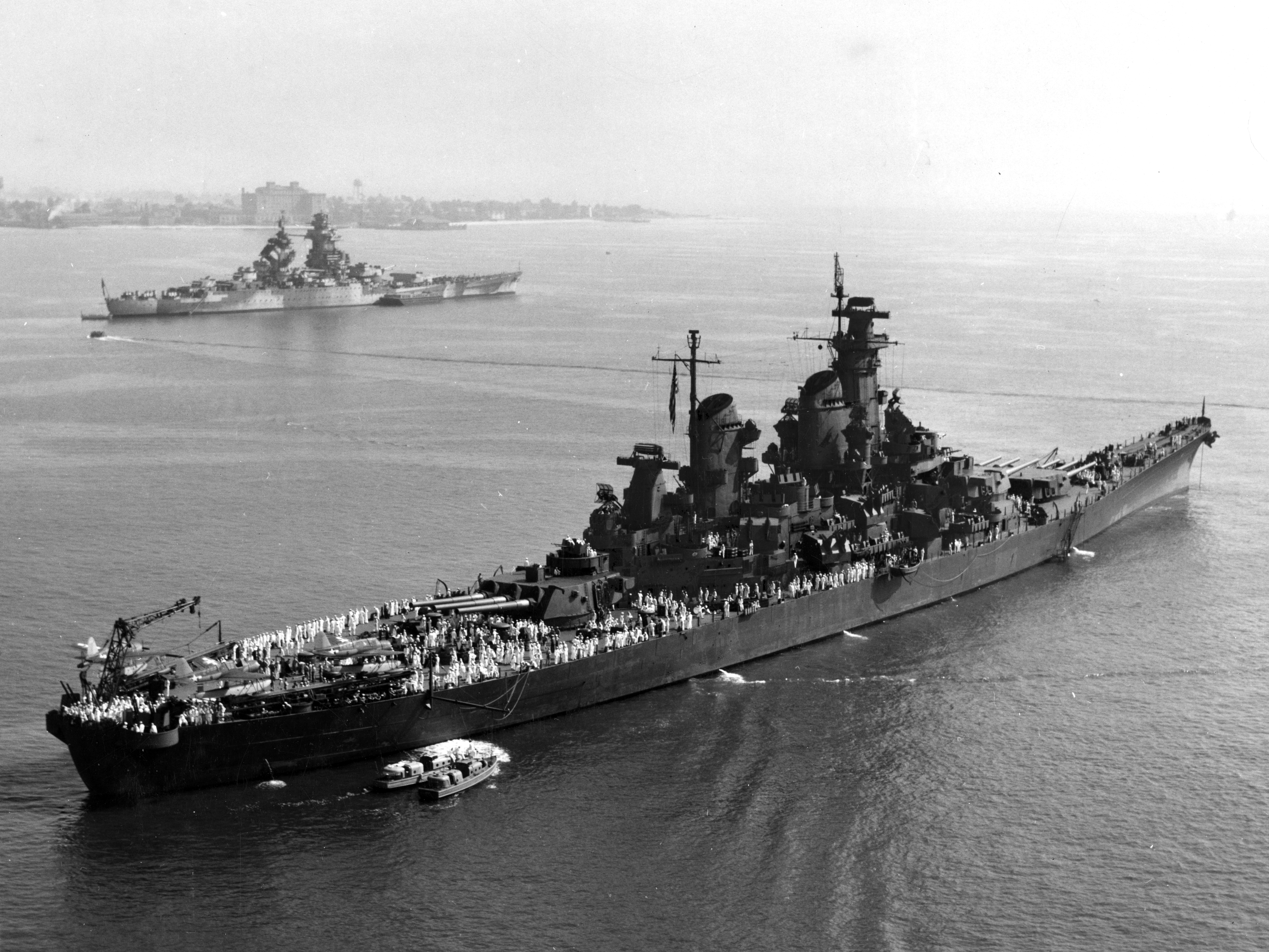
New Jersey with the French battleship Richelieu (left) at Hampton Roads in September 1943

New Jersey completed fitting out and trained her initial crew in the Western Atlantic Ocean and Caribbean Sea. On 7 January 1944, she passed through the Panama Canal war-bound for Funafuti, Ellice Islands. She reported there on 22 January for duty with the United States Fifth Fleet and three days later met with Task Group 58.2 (TG 58.2) for the assault on the Marshall Islands. New Jersey screened the aircraft carriers from Japanese attack as planes from TG 58.2 flew strikes against Kwajalein and Eniwetok from 29 January to 2 February, softening up the latter for its invasion and supporting the troops who landed on 31 January.

New Jersey began her career as a flagship on 4 February in Majuro Lagoon, when Admiral Raymond A. Spruance, commanding the 5th Fleet, broke his flag from her main. Her first action as a flagship was in Operation Hailstone, a two-day surface and air strike by her task force against the major Japanese fleet base on Truk in the Carolines. This attack, coordinated with the assault on Kwajalein, effectively interdicted the Japanese naval retaliation to the conquest of the Marshalls. On 17 and 18 February, the task force accounted for two Japanese light cruisers, four destroyers, three auxiliary cruisers, two submarine tenders, two submarine chasers, an armed trawler, a plane ferry, and 23 other auxiliaries, not including small craft. New Jersey destroyed a trawler, and with other ships, sank the destroyer Maikaze. New Jersey also fired on an enemy aircraft that attacked her formation. The task group returned to the Marshalls on 19 February.

Between 17 March and 10 April, New Jersey first sailed with Rear Admiral Marc A. Mitscher's flagship Lexington for an air and surface bombardment of Mille, then rejoined TG 58.2 for a strike against shipping in the Palaus, and bombarded Woleai. Upon his return to Majuro, Admiral Spruance transferred his flag to Indianapolis. New Jersey's next war cruise, 13 April – 4 May 1944, began and ended at Majuro. She screened the carrier striking force that gave air support to the invasion of Aitape, Tanahmerah Bay, and Humboldt Bay, New Guinea, on 22 April, then shelled shipping and shore installations at Truk on 29–30 April. New Jersey and her formation shot down two enemy torpedo bombers at Truk. Her 16-inch salvos pounded Ponape on 1 May, destroying fuel tanks, badly damaging the airfield, and demolishing a headquarters building.

After rehearsing in the Marshalls for the invasion of the Marianas, New Jersey put to sea on 6 June in the screening and bombardment group of Admiral Mitscher's task force. On the second day of preinvasion air strikes, 12 June, New Jersey shot down an enemy torpedo bomber, and during the next two days, her heavy guns battered Saipan and Tinian in advance of the Marine landings on 15 June. The Japanese response to the Marianas operation was an order to its main surface fleet to destroy the American invasion force. Shadowing American submarines tracked the Japanese fleet into the Philippine Sea as Admiral Spruance joined his task force with Admiral Mitscher's to meet the enemy. New Jersey took station in the protective screen around the carriers on 19 June 1944 as American and Japanese pilots dueled in the Battle of the Philippine Sea. That day and the next crippled Japanese naval aviation, in what would become known as the "Marianas Turkey Shoot", the Japanese lost some 400 planes for fewer than two dozen American aircraft in return. This loss of trained pilots and aircraft was equaled in disaster by the sinking of the Japanese aircraft carriers Taihō and Shōkaku by the submarines Albacore and Cavalla, respectively, and the loss of Hiyō to aircraft launched from the light aircraft carrier Belleau Wood. In addition to these losses, Allied forces succeeded in damaging two Japanese carriers and a battleship. The AA fire of New Jersey and the other screening ships proved virtually impenetrable; two American ships were slightly damaged during the battle. Only 17 American planes were lost in combat.

=== Service with the 3rd Fleet, Admiral Halsey ===
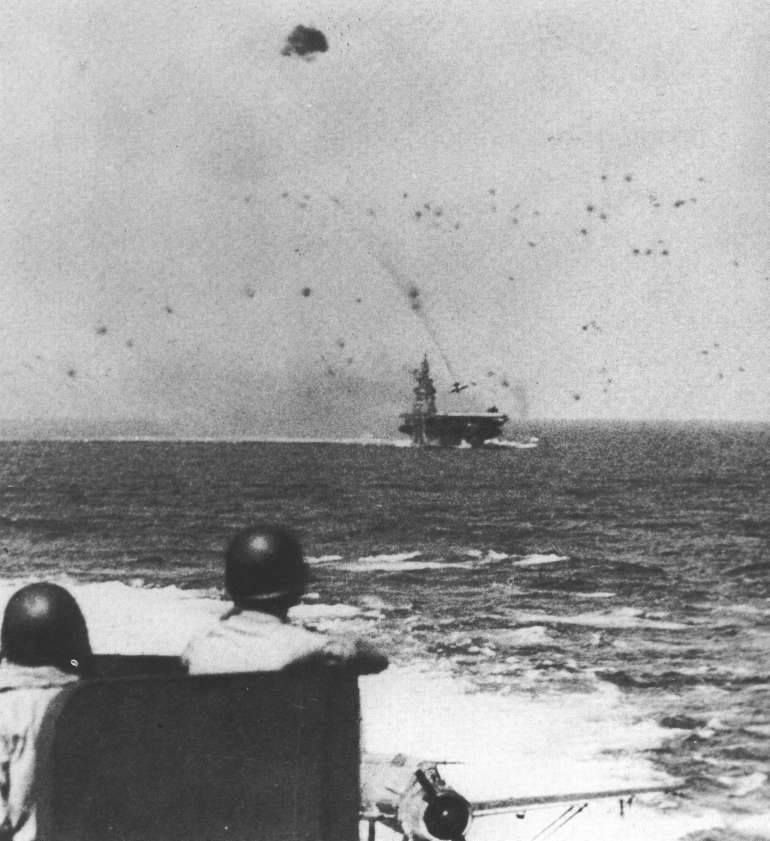
A crewman assigned to one of New Jersey's AA guns watches as a Japanese kamikaze pilot prepares to strike Intrepid.

New Jersey's final contribution to the conquest of the Marianas was in strikes on Guam and the Palaus, from which she sailed for Pearl Harbor, arriving 9 August. Here, she broke the flag of Admiral William F. Halsey Jr., on 24 August, becoming flagship of the U.S. Third Fleet. On 30 August, New Jersey set sail from Pearl Harbor and for the next 8 months was based at Ulithi to lend support to Allied forces operating in the Philippines. In this span of the Pacific War, fast-carrier task forces ranged the waters off the Philippines, Okinawa, and Formosa, making repeated strikes at airfields, shipping, shore bases, and invasion beaches.

In September, the targets were in the Visayas and the southern Philippines, then Manila and Cavite, Panay, Negros, Leyte, and Cebu. Early in October, raids to destroy enemy air power based on Okinawa and Formosa were begun in preparation for the Leyte landings of 20 October 1944. This invasion brought on the last great sortie of the Imperial Japanese Navy. Its plan for the Battle of Leyte Gulf included a feint by a northern force of heavy attack carriers, depleted of planes, to draw away the battleships, cruisers, and fast carriers with which Admiral Halsey was protecting the landings. This was to allow the Japanese Center Force to enter the gulf through the San Bernardino Strait. At the opening of the battle, planes from the carriers guarded by New Jersey struck hard at both the Japanese Southern and Center Forces, sinking a battleship on 23 October. The next day, Halsey shaped his course north after the decoy force had been spotted. Planes from his carriers sank four of the Japanese carriers, as well as a destroyer and a cruiser, while New Jersey steamed south at flank speed to meet the newly developed threat of the Center Force. It had been turned back in defeat by the time she arrived.

New Jersey rejoined her fast carriers near San Bernardino on 27 October 1944 for strikes on central and southern Luzon. Two days later, the force came under kamikaze attack. New Jersey shot down a plane whose pilot maneuvered it into the port gun galleries of Intrepid, while machine gun fire from Intrepid wounded three of New Jersey's men. During a similar action on 25 November, three Japanese planes were shot down by the combined fire of the force, part of one flaming onto the flight deck of Hancock. Intrepid was again attacked; she shot down one would-be kamikaze aircraft, but was hit by another despite hits scored on the attacker by New Jersey gunners. New Jersey shot down a plane diving on Cabot and hit another plane, which smashed into Cabot's port bow.

On 18 December 1944, the ships of Task Force 38 encountered Typhoon Cobra during their attempt to refuel at sea. At the time, the ships were operating about 300 miles (500 km) east of Luzon in the Philippine Sea. The carriers had just completed three days of heavy raids against Japanese airfields, suppressing enemy aircraft during the American amphibious operations against Mindoro in the Philippines. The task force met with Captain Jasper T. Acuff and his fueling group on 17 December with the intention of refueling all ships in the task force and replacing lost aircraft.

Although the sea had been growing rougher all day, the nearby cyclonic disturbance gave relatively little warning of its approach. Each of the carriers in the Third Fleet had a weatherman aboard, and as the fleet flagship, New Jersey had a highly experienced weatherman, Commander G. F. Kosco, a graduate of the aerology course at Massachusetts Institute of Technology, who had also studied hurricanes in the West Indies; despite this, none of these individuals or staffs was able to give Third Fleet due warning of the impending typhoon. On 18 December, the typhoon overtook the task force, while many of the ships were attempting to refuel. Many of the ships were caught near the center of the storm and buffeted by extreme seas and hurricane-force winds. Three destroyers—Hull, Monaghan, and Spence—capsized and sank with nearly all hands, while a cruiser, five aircraft carriers, and three destroyers suffered serious damage. About 790 officers and men were lost or killed, with another 80 injured. Fires occurred in three carriers when planes broke loose in their hangars, and some 146 planes on various ships were lost or damaged beyond economical repair by fires, impact damage, or by being swept overboard. New Jersey survived the storm largely unscathed. She returned to Ulithi on Christmas Eve to be met by Fleet Admiral Chester Nimitz.

=== Service with Battleship Division Seven, Admiral Badger ===
From 30 December 1944 to 25 January 1945, New Jersey conducted her last cruise as Admiral Halsey's flagship. She guarded the carriers in their strikes on Formosa, Okinawa, and Luzon, on the coast of Indo-China, Hong Kong, Shantou, and Amoy, and again on Formosa and Okinawa. At Ulithi on 27 January, Admiral Halsey lowered his flag on New Jersey, but it was replaced two days later by that of Rear Admiral Oscar C. Badger II, commanding Battleship Division 7. In support of the assault on Iwo Jima, New Jersey screened the Essex group in air attacks on the island 19–21 February, and gave the same service for the first major carrier raid on Tokyo on 25 February, a raid aimed specifically at aircraft production. During the next two days, Okinawa was attacked from the air by the same strike force.

New Jersey was directly engaged in the invasion of Okinawa from 14 March until 16 April. As the carriers prepared for the invasion with strikes there and on Honshū, New Jersey fought off air raids, used her seaplanes to rescue downed pilots, defended the carriers from kamikaze planes, shooting down at least three and assisting in the destruction of others. On 24 March 1945, she again carried out the role of heavy bombardment, preparing the invasion beaches for the assault a week later. During the final months of the war, New Jersey was overhauled at Puget Sound Naval Shipyard, from which she sailed 4 July for San Pedro, Pearl Harbor, and Eniwetok bound for Guam. Here on 14 August, she once again became flagship of the Fifth Fleet under Admiral Spruance. Brief stays at Manila and Okinawa preceded her arrival in Tokyo Bay on 17 September, where she served as flagship for the successive commanders of USN forces in Japanese waters until relieved on 28 January 1946 by Iowa (BB-61). As part of the ongoing Operation Magic Carpet, New Jersey took aboard nearly 1000 homeward-bound troops, with whom she arrived at San Francisco 10 February.

== After World War II (1946–1950) ==
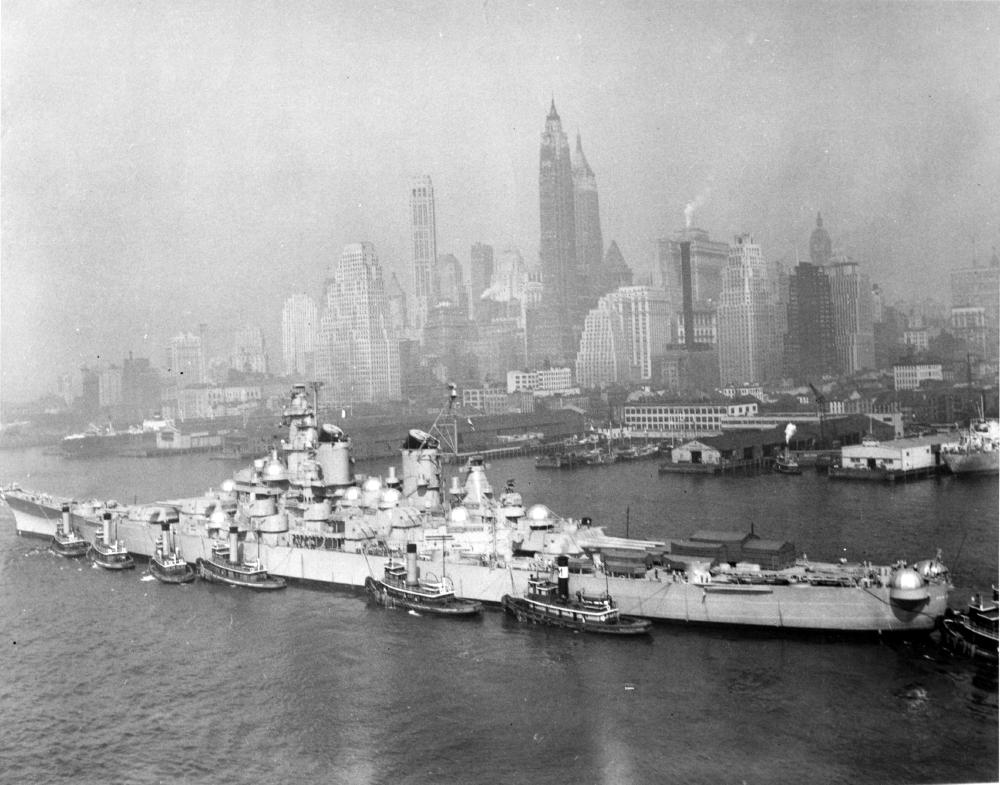
New Jersey photographed shortly after her 1948 decommissioning: The igloo-like domes on the ship were placed over her AA guns as protection from the elements.

After West Coast operations and a normal overhaul at Puget Sound, New Jersey came home to Bayonne, New Jersey, for a fourth birthday party on 23 May 1947. Present were Governor Alfred E. Driscoll, former Governor Walter E. Edge, and other dignitaries. Between 7 June and 26 August, New Jersey formed part of the first training squadron to cruise Northern European waters since the beginning of World War II. Over 2000 United States Naval Academy and NROTC midshipmen received seagoing experience under the command of Admiral Richard L. Connolly, Commander Naval Forces Eastern Atlantic and Mediterranean, who broke his flag in New Jersey at Rosyth, Scotland, on 23 June. She was the scene of official receptions at Oslo, where King Haakon VII of Norway inspected the crew on 2 July, and at Portsmouth, England. The training fleet was westward bound on 18 July for exercises in the Caribbean and Western Atlantic.

After serving at New York as flagship for Rear Admiral Heber H. McLean, Commander, Battleship Division 1, 12 September – 18 October, New Jersey was inactivated at the New York Naval Shipyard. She was decommissioned at Bayonne on 30 June 1948 and assigned to the New York Group, Atlantic Reserve Fleet.

== The Korean War (1950–1953) ==
In 1950, North Korea invaded South Korea, prompting the U.S. to intervene in the name of the United Nations (UN). President Harry S. Truman was caught off guard when the invasion struck, but quickly ordered U.S. forces stationed in Japan into South Korea. Truman also sent U.S.-based troops, tanks, fighter and bomber aircraft, and a strong naval force to Korea to support the Republic of Korea. As part of the naval mobilization, New Jersey was recalled from the mothball fleet to provide seaborne artillery support for the UN and South Korean troops. New Jersey was recommissioned at Bayonne on 21 November 1950, Captain David M. Tyree in command, and proceeded to the Caribbean. She sailed from Norfolk, Virginia, on 16 April 1951 and arrived from Japan off the east coast of Korea on 17 May. Vice Admiral Harold M. Martin, commanding the U.S. Seventh Fleet, placed his flag in New Jersey for the next six months.

New Jersey's guns opened the first shore bombardment of her Korean career at Wonsan on 20 May. During her two tours of duty in Korean waters, she was repeatedly called upon for seaborne mobile artillery. In direct support to UN troops in preparation for ground actions, interdicting Communist supply and communication routes, or destroying supplies and troop positions, New Jersey used her 16-inch guns to fire far beyond the capacity of land artillery, moved rapidly and free from major attack from one target to another, and at the same time could be available immediately to guard aircraft carriers should they require her protection. On this first such mission at Wonsan,t she received her only combat casualties of the Korean War. One of her men was killed with two severely wounded when she took a hit from a shore battery on her number-one turret and received a near miss aft to port.

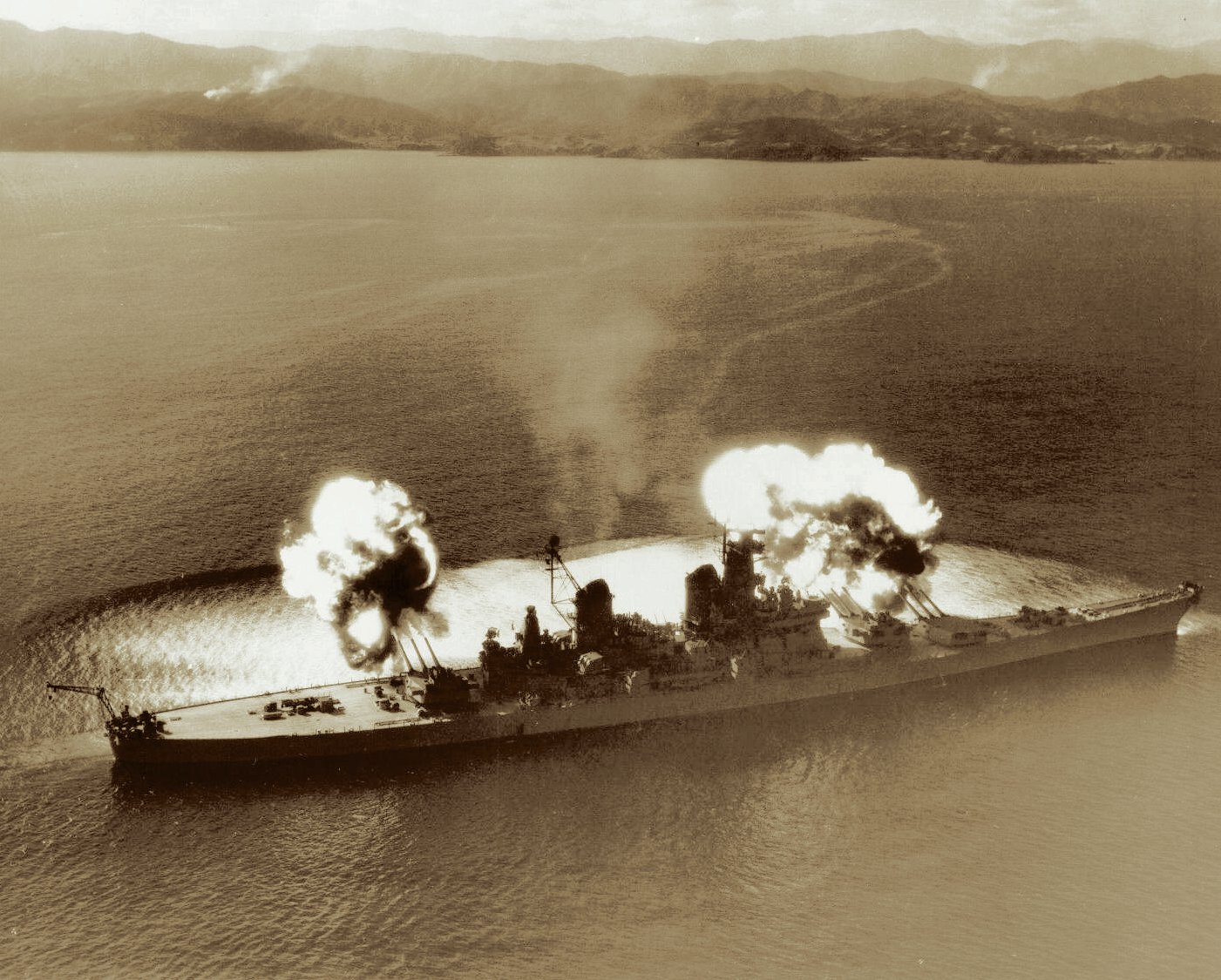
New Jersey opening fire on North Korean targets near the 38th parallel

Between 23 and 27 May and again on 30 May 1951, New Jersey pounded targets near Yangyang and Kansong, dispersing troop concentrations, dropping a bridge span, and destroying three large ammunition dumps. Air spotters reported Yangyang abandoned at the end of this action, while railroad facilities and vehicles were smashed at Kansong. On 24 May, she lost one of her helicopters after the crew pushed their chopper to the limit of its fuel searching for a downed aviator. The helicopter crew was able to reach friendly territory and the members later returned to their ship.

With Admiral Arthur W. Radford, Commander-in-Chief Pacific Fleet, and Vice Admiral C. Turner Joy, Commander Naval Forces Far East, aboard, New Jersey bombarded targets at Wonsan on 4 June. At Kansong two days later, she fired her main battery at an artillery regiment and truck encampment, with Seventh Fleet aircraft spotting targets and reporting successes. On 28 July off Wonsan, the battleship was again taken under fire by shore batteries. Several near misses splashed to port, but New Jersey's precision fire silenced the enemy and destroyed several gun emplacements. Between 4 and 12 July, New Jersey supported a UN push in the Kansong area, firing at enemy buildup and reorganization positions. As the Republic of Korea's First Division hurled itself on the enemy, shore fire-control observers saw New Jersey's salvos hit directly on enemy mortar emplacements, supply and ammunition dumps, and personnel concentrations. New Jersey returned to Wonsan on 18 July, where she destroyed five gun emplacements with five direct hits.

New Jersey sailed to the aid of troops of the Republic of Korea once more on 17 August, returning to the Kansong area, where for four days, she provided harassing fire by night and broke up counterattacks by day, inflicting a heavy toll on enemy troops. She returned to this general area yet again 29 August, when she fired in an amphibious demonstration staged behind enemy lines to ease pressure on the Republic of Korea's troops. The next day, she started a three-day saturation of the Changjon area, with one of her own helicopters spotting the results - four buildings destroyed, road junctions smashed, railroad marshaling yards afire, tracks cut and uprooted, coal stocks scattered, and many buildings and warehouses set on fire.

Aside from a brief break in firing on 23 September to take aboard wounded from the Korean frigate Apnok (PF-62), damaged by gunfire, New Jersey was heavily engaged in bombarding the Kansong area, supporting the movement of the U.S. X Corps. The pattern again was harassing fire by night, destruction of known targets by day. Enemy movement was restricted by the fire of her big guns. A bridge, a dam, several gun emplacements, mortar positions, pillboxes, bunkers, and two ammunition dumps were demolished. On 1 October 1951, General Omar Bradley, chairman of the Joint Chiefs of Staff, and General Matthew B. Ridgeway, Commander-in-chief Far East, came on board to confer with Admiral Martin.

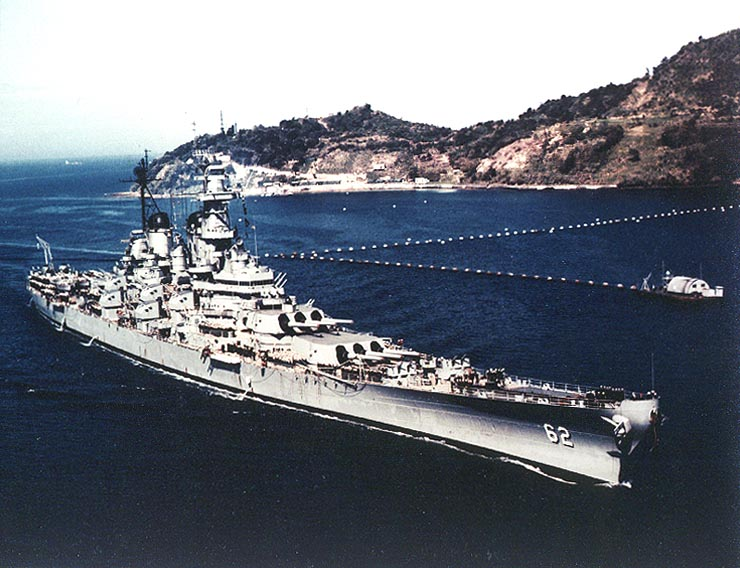
New Jersey in Japanese waters, 1953

Between 1 and 6 October, New Jersey was in action daily at Kansong, Hamhung, Hungnam, Tanchon, and Songjin. Enemy bunkers and supply concentrations provided the majority of the targets at Kansong; at the others, New Jersey fired on railroads, tunnels, bridges, an oil refinery, trains, and shore batteries. She also engaged an enemy gun emplacement with her 5-inch (127 mm) guns, which New Jersey successfully destroyed. The Kojo area was her target on 16 October, as she sailed in company with HMS Belfast, pilots from HMAS Sydney spotting. The operation was well-planned and coordinated, and excellent results were obtained. Another highly satisfactory day was 16 October, when the spotter over the Kansong area reported "beautiful shooting every shot on target-most beautiful shooting I have seen in five years." This five-hour bombardment leveled 10 artillery positions, and in smashing trenches and bunkers, inflicted some 500 enemy casualties.

New Jersey dashed up the North Korean coast, raiding transportation facilities from 1 to 6 November. She struck at bridges, roads, and rail installations at Wonsan, Hungnam, Tanchon, Iowon, Songjin, and Chongjin, leaving four bridges destroyed, others badly damaged, two marshaling yards badly torn up, and many feet of track destroyed. With renewed attacks on Kansong and near the Chang-San-Got Peninsula 11 and 13 November, New Jersey completed her first tour of duty in Korea. Relieved as flagship by Wisconsin, New Jersey cleared Yokosuka for Hawaii, Long Beach, and the Panama Canal, and she returned to Norfolk on 20 December for a six-month overhaul. Between 19 July 1952 and 5 September, she sailed as flagship for Rear Admiral Harry R. Thurber, who commanded the NROTC midshipman training cruise to Cherbourg, Lisbon, and the Caribbean. Now, New Jersey prepared and trained for her second Korean tour, for which she sailed from Norfolk on 5 March 1953.

Shaping her course via the Panama Canal, Long Beach, and Hawaii, New Jersey reached Yokosuka on 5 April and the next day relieved Missouri as flagship of Vice Admiral Joseph H. Clark, Commander 7th Fleet. On 12 April, New Jersey returned to action by shelling Chongjin; in 7 minutes, she scored seven direct hits, blowing away half the main communications building there. At Pusan two days later, New Jersey manned her rails to welcome the President of the Republic of Korea and Madame Rhee, and American Ambassador Ellis O. Briggs. New Jersey fired on coastal batteries and buildings at Kojo 16 April, on railway track and tunnels near Hungnam 18 April, and on gun emplacements around Wonsan Harbor 20 April, silencing them in five areas after she had taken several near misses herself. Songjin provided targets on 23 April; New Jersey scored six direct 16-inch shell (406 mm) hits on a railroad tunnel and knocked out two rail bridges.

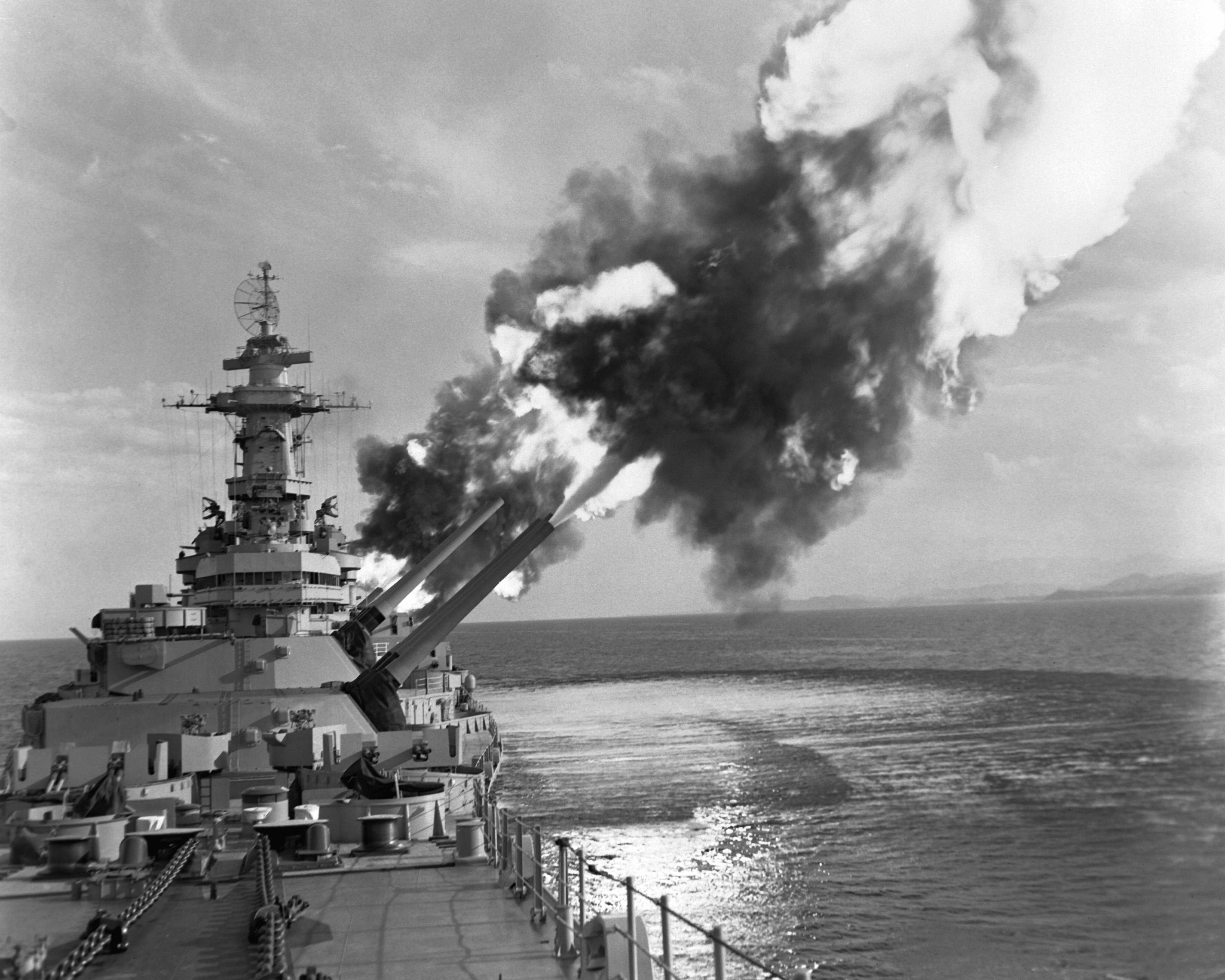
New Jersey firing a six-gun salvo of 16-inch shells into an enemy troop concentration near Kaesong, Korea

New Jersey provided artillery support for a major air and surface strike at Wonsan on 1 May, as Seventh Fleet planes both attacked the enemy and spotted for the battleship. She knocked out 11 Communist shore guns that day, and four days later destroyed the key observation post on the island of Hodo Pando, commanding the harbor. Two days later, Kalmagak at Wonsan was her target. New Jersey's 10th birthday, 23 May 1953, was celebrated at Incheon with President and Madame Rhee, Lieutenant General Maxwell D. Taylor, and other dignitaries on board. Two days later, New Jersey returned to action along the west coast at Chinampo to knock out harbor defense positions.

The battleship was under fire at Wonsan on 27–29 May, but her 5-inch (127 mm) guns silenced the counterfire, and her 16-inch shells destroyed five gun emplacements and four gun caves. She also hit a target that flamed spectacularly, either a fuel storage area or an ammunition dump. New Jersey returned to the key task of direct support to troops at Kosong on 7 June. On her first mission, she completely destroyed two gun positions, an observation post, and their supporting trenches, then stood by on call for further aid. She then sailed back to Wonsan for a day-long bombardment on 24 June, aimed at guns placed in caves. The results were excellent, with eight direct hits on three caves, one cave demolished, and four others closed. The next day, she returned to troop support at Kosong, her assignment until 10 July, aside from necessary withdrawal for replenishment.

At Wonsan on 11–12 July, New Jersey fired one of the most concentrated bombardments of her Korean duty. For 9 hours the first day, and for 7 the second, her guns opened fire on gun positions and bunkers on Hodo Pando and the mainland with telling effect. At least 10 enemy guns were destroyed, many were damaged, and a number of caves and tunnels were sealed. New Jersey smashed radar-control positions and bridges at Kojo on 13 July, and was once more on the east coast bomb line on 22–24 July to support South Korean troops near Kosong. These days found her gunners at their most accurate; a large cave housing an important enemy observation post was closed, and the end of a month-long UN effort came, with a great many bunkers, artillery areas, observation posts, trenches, tanks, and other weapons were destroyed.

At sunrise on 25 July 1953, New Jersey was off the key port, rail, and communications center of Hungnam, pounding coastal guns, bridges, a factory area, and oil storage tanks. She sailed north that afternoon, firing at rail lines and railroad tunnels as she made for Tanchon, where she launched a whaleboat in an attempt to spot a train known to run nightly along the coast. Her big guns were trained on two tunnels between which she hoped to catch the train, but in the darkness, she could not see the results of her six-gun salvo.

== After the Korean War (1953–1967) ==
New Jersey's mission at Wonsan the next day was her last. Here, she destroyed large-caliber guns, bunkers, caves, and trenches. Two days later, she learned of the truce. Her crew celebrated during a seven-day visit at Hong Kong, where she anchored on 20 August. Operations around Japan and off Formosa were carried out for the remainder of her tour, which was highlighted by a visit to Pusan, where President Rhee came aboard on 16 September to present the Korean Presidential Unit Citation to the Seventh Fleet.

Relieved as flagship at Yokosuka by Wisconsin on 14 October, New Jersey was homeward bound the next day, reaching Norfolk on 14 November. During the next two summers, she crossed the Atlantic with midshipmen on board for training, and during the rest of the year, she sharpened her skills with exercises and training maneuvers along the Atlantic Coast and in the Caribbean. New Jersey stood out of Norfolk on 7 September 1955 for her first tour of duty with the United States Sixth Fleet in the Mediterranean. Her ports of call included Gibraltar, Valencia, Cannes, Istanbul, Souda Bay, and Barcelona. She returned to Norfolk on 7 January 1956 for the spring program of training operations. That summer, she again carried midshipmen to Northern Europe for training, bringing them home to Annapolis on 31 July. New Jersey sailed for Europe once more on 27 August as flagship of Vice Admiral Charles Wellborn, Jr., Commander United States Second Fleet. She called at Lisbon, participated in NATO exercises off Scotland, and paid an official visit to Norway, where Crown Prince Olav was a guest. She returned to Norfolk on 15 October, and on 14 December, she arrived at New York Naval Shipyard for inactivation. She was decommissioned and placed in reserve at Bayonne on 21 August 1957.

== The Vietnam War (1967–1969) ==
Due to heavy loss rates of U.S. aircraft (commencing with Operation Rolling Thunder in 1965), studies were conducted on ways of alleviating those air losses while at the same time delivering the ordnance payloads required by the escalation of the war. On 31 May 1967, Secretary of Defense Robert McNamara authorized a study aimed at determining what would be required to get New Jersey reactivated in her present condition, and when the results of the submitted study proved favorable toward the reactivation, he took action. In August 1967, the secretary of Defense made the decision to recommission a battleship "for employment in the Pacific Fleet to augment the naval gunfire support force in Southeast Asia". New Jersey was selected for this task because she was in better material condition than her sisters, having received an extensive overhaul prior to decommissioning. Upon her reactivation, she underwent a period of modernization during which the 20 mm and 40 mm AA guns on the battleship were removed, and she received improved electronic warfare systems and improvements to her radar. Armed as such, New Jersey was formally recommissioned on 6 April 1968 at the Philadelphia Naval Shipyard, Captain J. Edward Snyder in command. During sea trials following her modernization, New Jersey set the battleship world speed record by achieving 35.2 knots (65.2 km/h; 40.5 mph), maintaining this speed for six hours.

New Jersey, then the world's only active battleship, departed Philadelphia on 16 May, calling at Norfolk and transiting the Panama Canal on 4 June, before arriving at her new home port of Long Beach, California, on 11 June. Further training off Southern California followed. On 24 July, New Jersey received 16-inch shells and powder tanks from Mount Katmai by conventional highline transfer and helicopter lift, the first time heavy battleship ammunition had been transferred by helicopter at sea (now known as vertical replenishment).

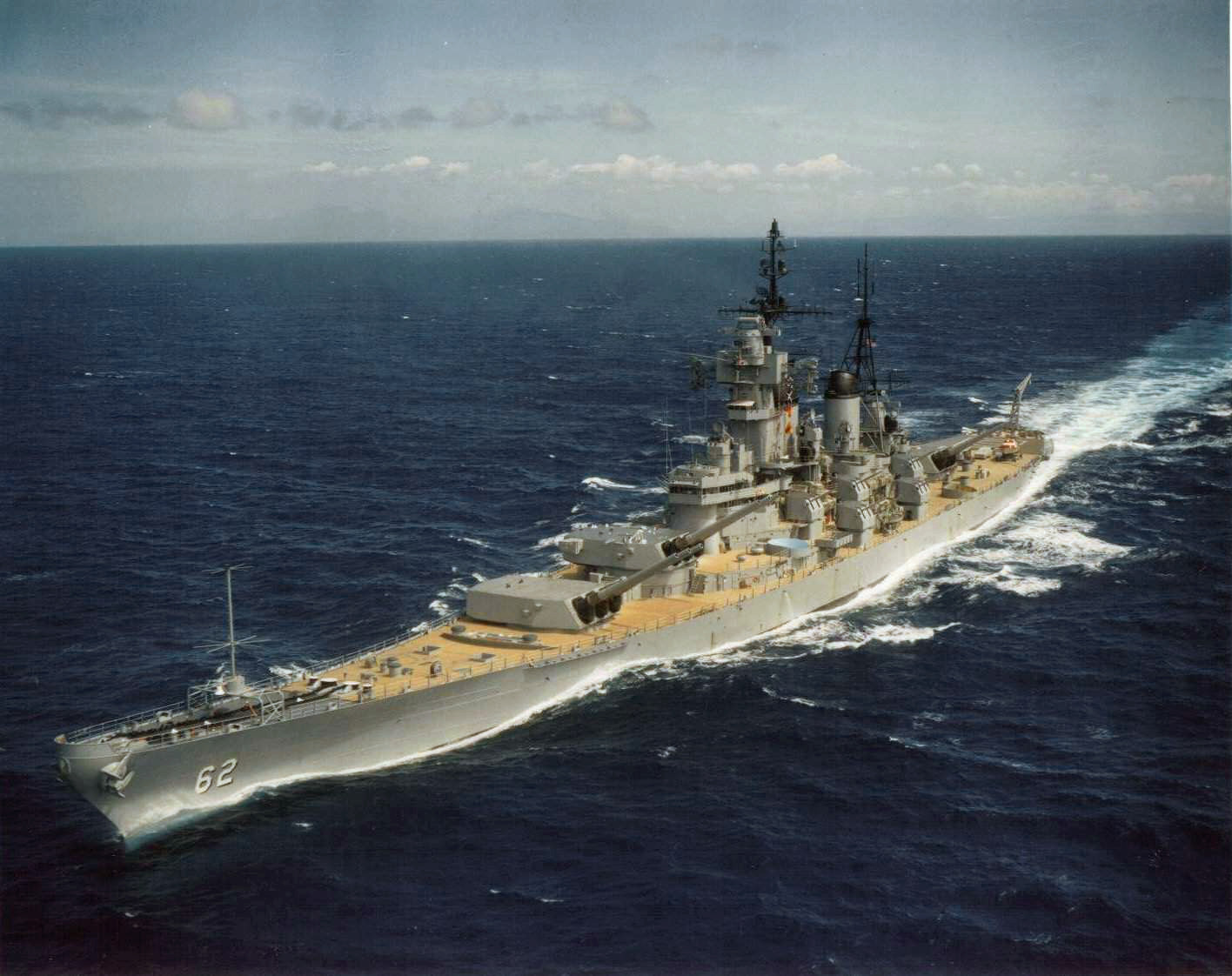
New Jersey off Oahu in September 1968, prior to departure on her first WESTPAC cruise following recommissioning for service in the Vietnam War

Departing Long Beach on 2 September, New Jersey touched at Pearl Harbor and Subic Bay before sailing on 25 September for her first tour on the gun line along the Vietnamese coast. Near the 17th parallel on 30 September, the battleship fired her first shots in battle in over 16 years, expending twenty-nine 16-inch rounds against People's Army of Vietnam (PAVN) targets in and near the demilitarized zone (DMZ) at the 17th parallel. New Jersey took up station off Tiger Island on 1 October and fired at targets north of the DMZ before moving south that afternoon to engage Viet Cong targets. She accounted for six bunkers, a supply truck, and an AA site that day; additionally, she helped rescue the crew of a Marine spotting plane forced down at sea by AA fire. On 3 October, New Jersey fired on targets south of Tiger Island, and on 4 October, the battleship fired on a Communist troop concentration and destroyed several bunkers. On the evening of 7 October, New Jersey received reports that a number of waterborne logistics craft were moving south near the mouth of the Song Giang River. New Jersey responded by closing on the formation, and she succeeded in sinking 11 of the craft before they could beach.

On 11 October, New Jersey engaged a coastal installation with her guns, but she shifted her fire when a reconnaisense plane spotting for the battleship reported an enemy truck concentration north of Nha Ky. New Jersey gunners quickly retrained the battleship's big guns and managed to inflict heavy damage on six of the vehicles. Early on the morning of 12 October, New Jersey trained her guns in anticipation of shelling the heavily fortified and well-protected Vinh caves. For the next three days, New Jersey pounded the area with her 16-inch shells in an effort to eliminate the Viet Cong presence in the region. Aided by spotter aircraft from the aircraft carrier USS America, New Jersey engaged enemy targets, setting several enemy positions on fire and sealing one cave. On 14 October New Jersey shifted her gunfire to the coastal artillery sites on Hon Mat Island, destroying one battery on the island.

On 16 October New Jersey took up station in support of the U.S. Third Marine Division. Using both the 16-inch and 5-inch guns, New Jersey engaged and destroyed 13 structures and an artillery site, in the process halting an enemy platoon moving through the DMZ. New Jersey continued to lend firepower support on the 17th until departing to lend her gunfire to the First Field Force. Foul weather prevented spotter aircraft from flying until 20 October; New Jersey quickly made up for lost time on the gun line, though, by destroying a Viet Cong command post and nine bunkers in support of the 173rd Airborne Brigade, who were operating about 50 miles (80 km) north of Nha Trang. The next day, New Jersey maneuvered into the waters of the Baie de Van Fong to fire at Viet Cong command posts, but poor visibility of the target area prevented any damage estimates.

On the night of 23 October, New Jersey steamed north to rearm before taking up position in support of the Third Marines on 25 October. That day, she shelled enemy troops located by a spotter plane. The next day, New Jersey engaged targets of opportunity, destroying 11 structures, seven bunkers, a concrete observation tower, and an enemy trench line. She also received hostile fire when North Vietnamese gunners attempted to strike at New Jersey with artillery positioned near Cap Lay. Some 10 to 12 rounds were launched at New Jersey, but the rounds fired landed well short of the battleship. Aerial spotters were called in to look at the suspected gun position; they reported no artillery present, but fresh tire tracks led to a concealed area, suggesting that artillery had been there earlier. Armed with this information, New Jersey fired five 16-inch shells at the site, but in the darkness, spotters were unable to confirm any hits.

On 28 October, New Jersey steamed south to engage Communist targets. During the shelling, aircraft spotting for the battleship reported taking heavy AA fire to the extreme north of the target zone; subsequently, New Jersey altered her fire to silence the site with her big guns. The next day, New Jersey leveled 30 structures, destroyed three underground bunkers, and shelled a Viet Cong trench line. That afternoon, an aerial observer located an enemy artillery position on a hilltop southwest of Cap Lay. New Jersey responded by firing six 16-inch rounds at the site, destroying it. Follow-up assaults on 30 October destroyed a Communist resupply area and an AA site. The official PAVN history claims that on 28 October, their 25th Battery, 21st Artillery Battalion using 130 mm guns hit the New Jersey, setting her ablaze.

Upon completion of this mission, New Jersey steamed south, taking a position off Da Nang and Point DeDe to lend naval gunfire support to the U.S. First Marine Division operating in the area. On 2 November, New Jersey commenced firing operations against nine positions, but the heavy foliage in the area prevented spotters from seeing the results of the shelling. On 4 November, New Jersey received orders to reinforce southern II Corps near Phan Thiết; she arrived on station later that night. The next day, she answered eight call-for-fire-support missions from the 173rd Airborne Brigade, in the process destroying eight Viet Cong bunkers and five structures. On 11 November, New Jersey departed Vietnamese waters to replenish; she returned to the gun line on 23 November and relieved USS Galveston, taking up position in support of the U.S. Army's Americal Division. That afternoon, New Jersey's 5-inch guns shelled enemy buildings, destroying 15 structures and inflicted heavy damage on 29 others.

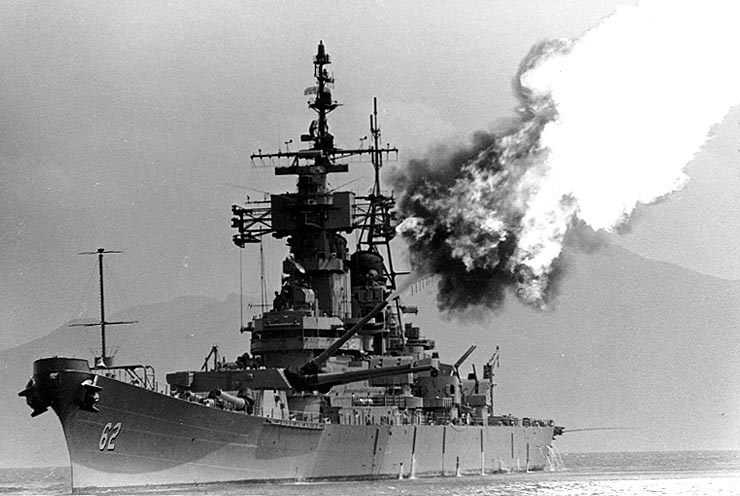
USS New Jersey bombarding positions during the Vietnam War

On 25 November, New Jersey launched the most destructive shore bombardment of her Vietnam tour. For the next two days, the battleship concentrated her fire at Viet Cong storage areas near Quảng Ngãi, destroying 182 structures and 54 bunkers, inflicting heavy damage to 93 structures, and demolishing several tunnel complexes before departing for Point Betsy near Hue on 27 November to support the 101st Airborne Division. Between 2 and 8 December, New Jersey returned to aid the Third Marine Division, shelling Viet Cong bunker complexes for the Marines operating around the Da Nang area before departing for Singapore on 9 December. On 26 December, New Jersey returned to the gun line, taking up station off Tuy Hòa in support of the Army of the Republic of Vietnam 47th Regiment. For the next three days, New Jersey fired her guns to support the II Corps, in the process destroying Viet Cong bunkers and supply depots and neutralizing enemy cave posts. New Jersey remained in the waters of the DMZ until after New Years, shelling Communist bunkers for ground troops until leaving to support the First Marine Division on 3 January 1969.

Throughout January and into February, New Jersey operated in support of the Marines. On 10 February, the battleship left to reinforce the Korean Second Marine Brigade operating near Da Nang. The battleship's target was a suspected subterranean staging area for a Viet Cong regiment. New Jersey's big guns went to work on the complex, firing 16-inch shells into tunnels and bunkers to aid the ground troops. On 14 February, the battleship steamed south of the DMZ to provide support for the Third Marine Division, in the process destroying an AA site with her big guns. The next day, New Jersey fired on an enemy rocket site northeast of Con Thien, destroying the facility, then trained her guns on known Communist positions to harass PAVN forces. On 22 February, New Jersey responded to an urgent request for fire support from the besieged Oceanview observation post near the DMZ. For the next six hours, New Jersey fired her guns, ultimately repelling the attacking force.

For the remainder of February and into March New Jersey shelled targets along the DMZ. On 13 March, the battleship departed the gun line bound for Subic Bay. She returned to action on 20 March, operating near Cam Ranh Bay in support of the Korean 9th Infantry Division. For the next week, New Jersey patrolled the waters between Phan Thiet and Tuy Hoa, shelling targets of opportunity along the coast. On 28 March, New Jersey took up station south of the DMZ to aid the Third Marine Division, remaining there until 1 April, whereupon New Jersey departed for Japan. During the battleship's tour of duty along the gun line in Vietnam, New Jersey had fired 5,688 rounds of 16-inch shells, and 14,891 rounds of 5-inch shells.

== After the Vietnam War (1969–1982) ==
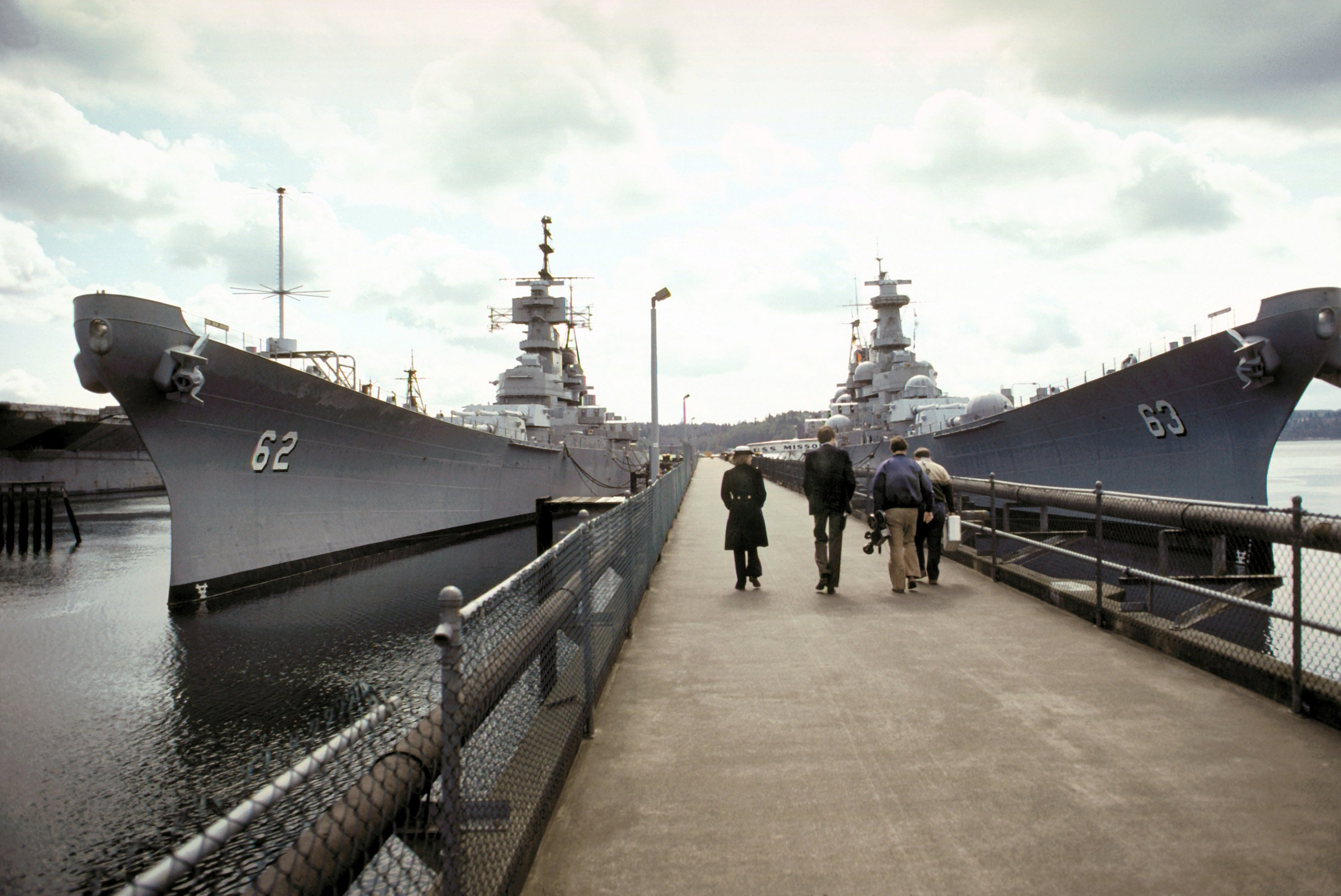
New Jersey and Missouri moored at the Naval Inactive Ship Maintenance Facility at Puget Sound Naval Shipyard in 1981: Note the difference between the modernized New Jersey and the nearly unmodified Missouri.

Her first Vietnam combat tour completed, New Jersey departed Subic Bay on 3 April 1969 for Japan. She arrived at Yokosuka for a two-day visit, sailing for the United States on 9 April. Her homecoming, however, was to be delayed. On the 15th, while New Jersey was still at sea, North Korean jet fighters shot down an unarmed EC-121 Constellation electronic surveillance plane over the Sea of Japan, killing its entire crew. A carrier task force was formed and sent to the Sea of Japan, while New Jersey was ordered to come about and steam toward Japan. On the 22nd, she arrived once more at Yokosuka, and immediately put to sea in readiness for what might befall.

As the crisis eased, New Jersey was released to continue her interrupted voyage. She anchored at Long Beach on 5 May 1969, her first visit to her home port in 8 months. Through the summer, New Jersey's crew worked to make her ready for another deployment, and deficiencies discovered on the gun line were remedied. According to official reports, though, reasons of economy were to dictate otherwise; on 22 August 1969, Secretary of Defense Melvin Laird released a list of names of ships to be inactivated; at the top of the list was New Jersey. Five days later, Captain Snyder was relieved of command by Captain Robert C. Peniston.

Assuming command of a ship already earmarked for the "mothball fleet", Captain Peniston and his crew prepared for their task. New Jersey got underway on the voyage 6 September, departing Long Beach for Puget Sound Naval Shipyard. She arrived on the 8th, and began preinactivation overhaul to ready herself for decommissioning. On 17 December 1969, New Jersey's colors were hauled down and she entered the inactive fleet, following the words of her last commanding officer: "Rest well, yet sleep lightly; and hear the call, if again sounded, to provide fire power for freedom."

== Reactivation (1982) ==
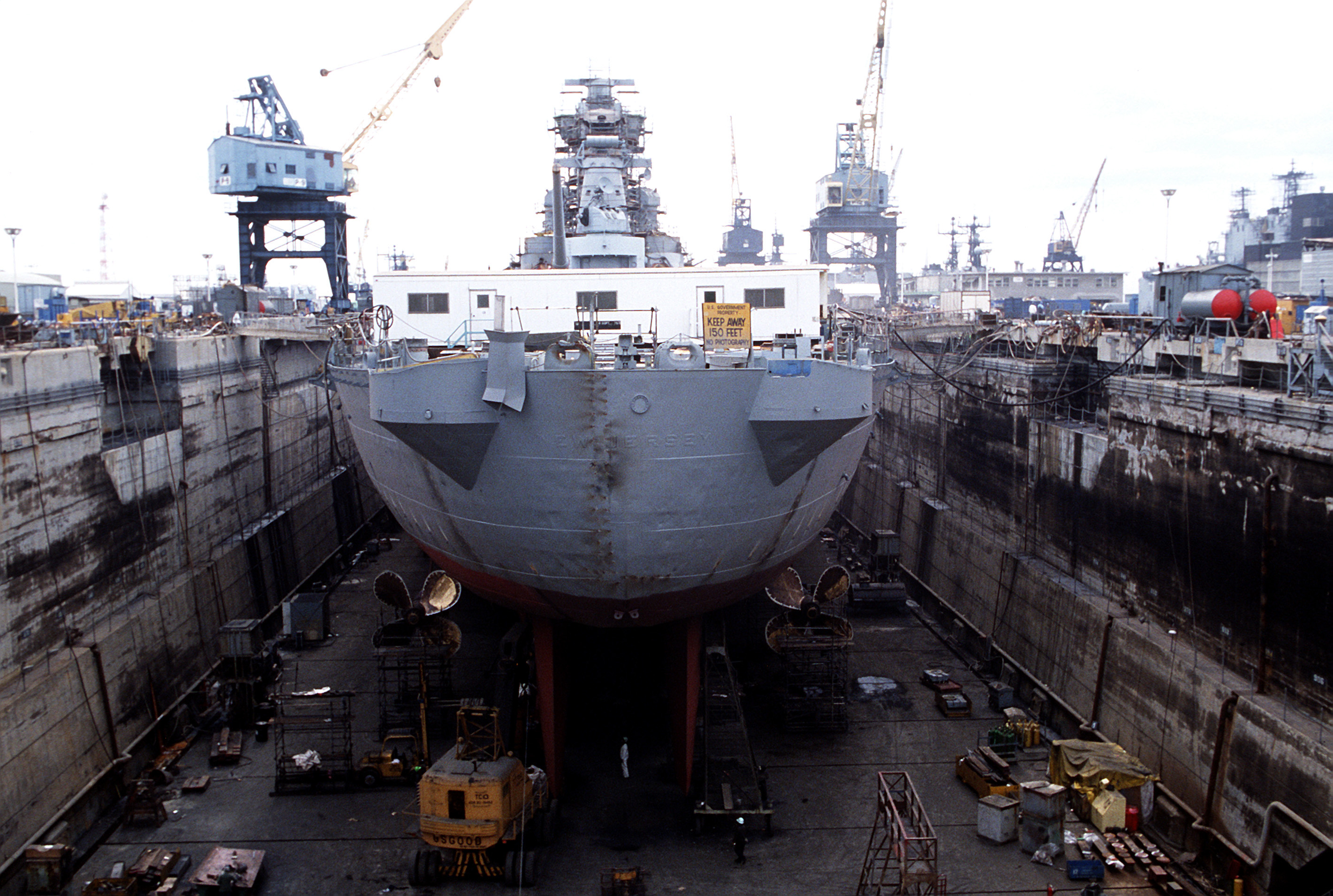
New Jersey in drydock while undergoing modernization

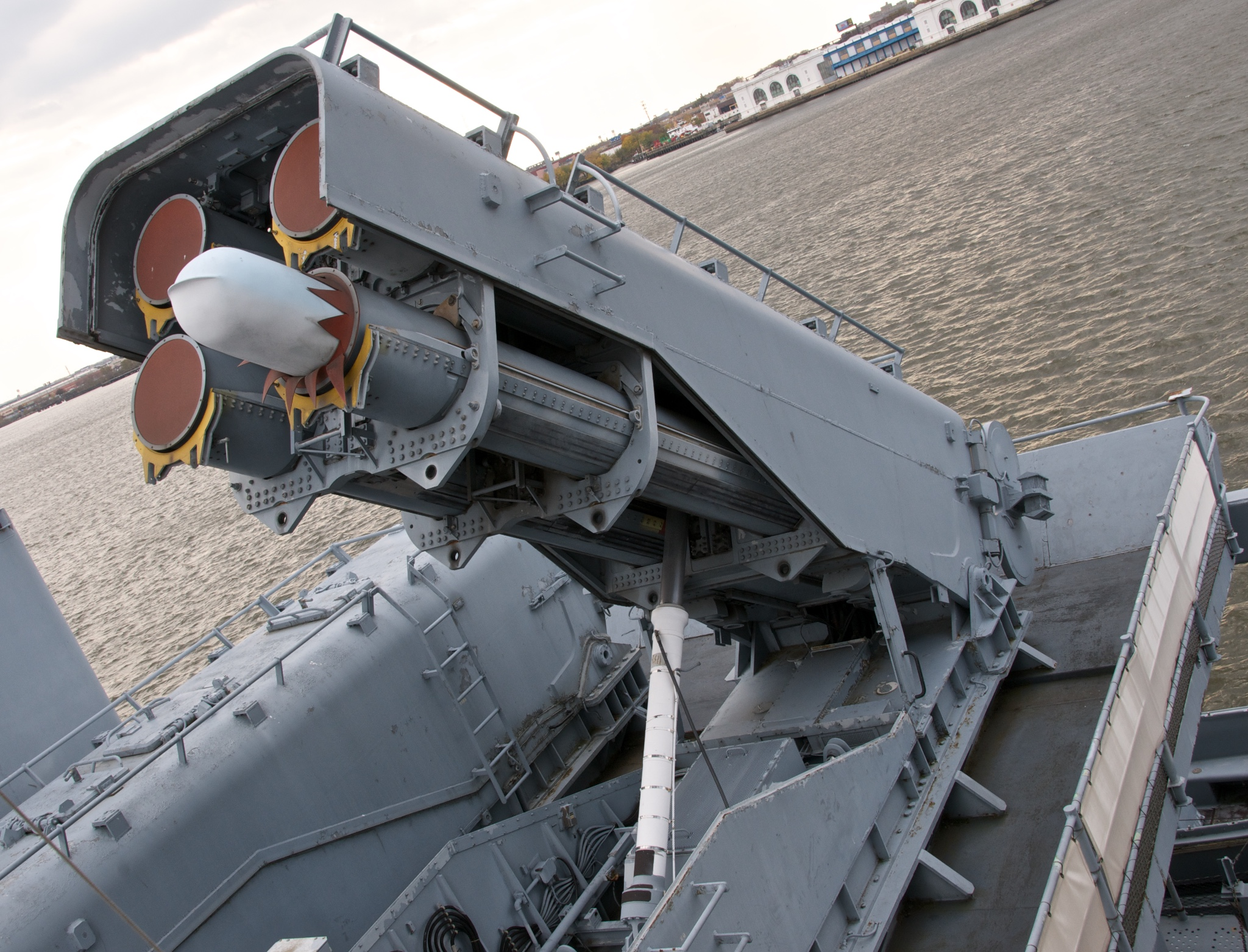
A Tomahawk cruise missile protrudes from an All-Up-Round canister.

As part of President Ronald Reagan and Navy Secretary John Lehman's efforts to create a 600-ship Navy, New Jersey was selected for reactivation in the spring of 1981, and she was towed from Puget Sound Naval Shipyard to Long Beach Naval Shipyard at the end of July 1981 for modernization/reactivation.

At the time of the reactivation, the USN envisioned using New Jersey and her sister ship Iowa to meet sustained global requirements and relieve the strain created by an increase in U.S. commitments to the Indian Ocean and Caribbean Sea regions. During this time, the USN developed several proposals to update its battleships to carry cruise and antiship missiles, as well as point defense system mounts. Preliminary modernizations schemes included the removal of four of the ten 5-inch gun mounts on New Jersey to make room for the armored box launchers that would be required to carry and launch the BGM-109 Tomahawk missiles. At one point, the NATO Sea Sparrow was to be installed on the reactivated battleships; however, the system was found to not be able to withstand the overpressure effects when firing the main battery.

On 28 December 1982, New Jersey was formally recommissioned at Long Beach, California, her new homeport. Her recommissioning marked a return of the world's last battleships after a 13-year absence from the world's oceans. New Jersey, decommissioned in 1969, then was the first to be recommissioned under the 600-ship Navy program.

New Jersey's modernization was unique in that she was to be the only reactivated Iowa-class battleship to lose a gun turret. At the time the USN made the announcement, plans were underway to remove New Jersey's number-three 16-in gun turret (located aft of the superstructure). In its place, the USN planned to install one of two systems, a vertical launching missile magazine, which would have enabled New Jersey to carry an additional 48 Tomahawk or Harpoon missiles, or to use the space generated by the removed gun turret for aircraft-related updates centering on VTOL- or V/STOL-type aircraft. These ideas were ultimately dropped, and New Jersey retained that gun turret during her 1980s career.

Over the next several months, the ship was upgraded with the most advanced weaponry available; among the new weapons systems installed were four MK 141 quad-cell launchers for 16 RGM-84 Harpoon antiship missiles, eight armored box launcher (ABL) mounts for 32 BGM-109 Tomahawk missiles, and a quartet of the USN's Phalanx close-in weapon system Gatling guns for defense against enemy antiship missiles and enemy aircraft. New Jersey also received eight RQ-2 Pioneer unmanned aerial vehicles, which are remote-control drones that replaced the helicopters previously used to spot for her nine 16-inch/50 Mark 7 guns. Also included in her modernization were upgrades to radar and fire-control systems for her guns and missiles and improved electronic warfare capabilities.

Because New Jersey had been recalled for service in the Vietnam War, her modernization differed from her sisters for a number of reasons. When reactivated in 1967, New Jersey had her 20 mm Oerlikon and 40 mm Bofors AA guns removed, and received improved electronic warfare capabilities. This alteration helped reduce the time needed to get New Jersey recommissioned; since she was not in her World War II format, the only major physical alteration to New Jersey involved the removal of four of her ten 5-inch gun mounts to make room for the ABLs. In addition to saving time, this also made New Jersey cheaper to reactivate, since the cost needed to modernize the battleship only included the addition of missile and gun system mounts, electronic warfare suites, and improved radar and gun-spotter technology.

Since the Tomahawk missile system had not yet been adopted for use during New Jersey's original update, the USN announced plans to divert assets from two of its Spruance-class destroyers to install the necessary Tomahawk launchers. Similarly, assets were diverted from two Farragut-class guided-missile destroyers to allow for the installation of Harpoon launchers on New Jersey.

== Lebanese Civil War (1983–1984) ==
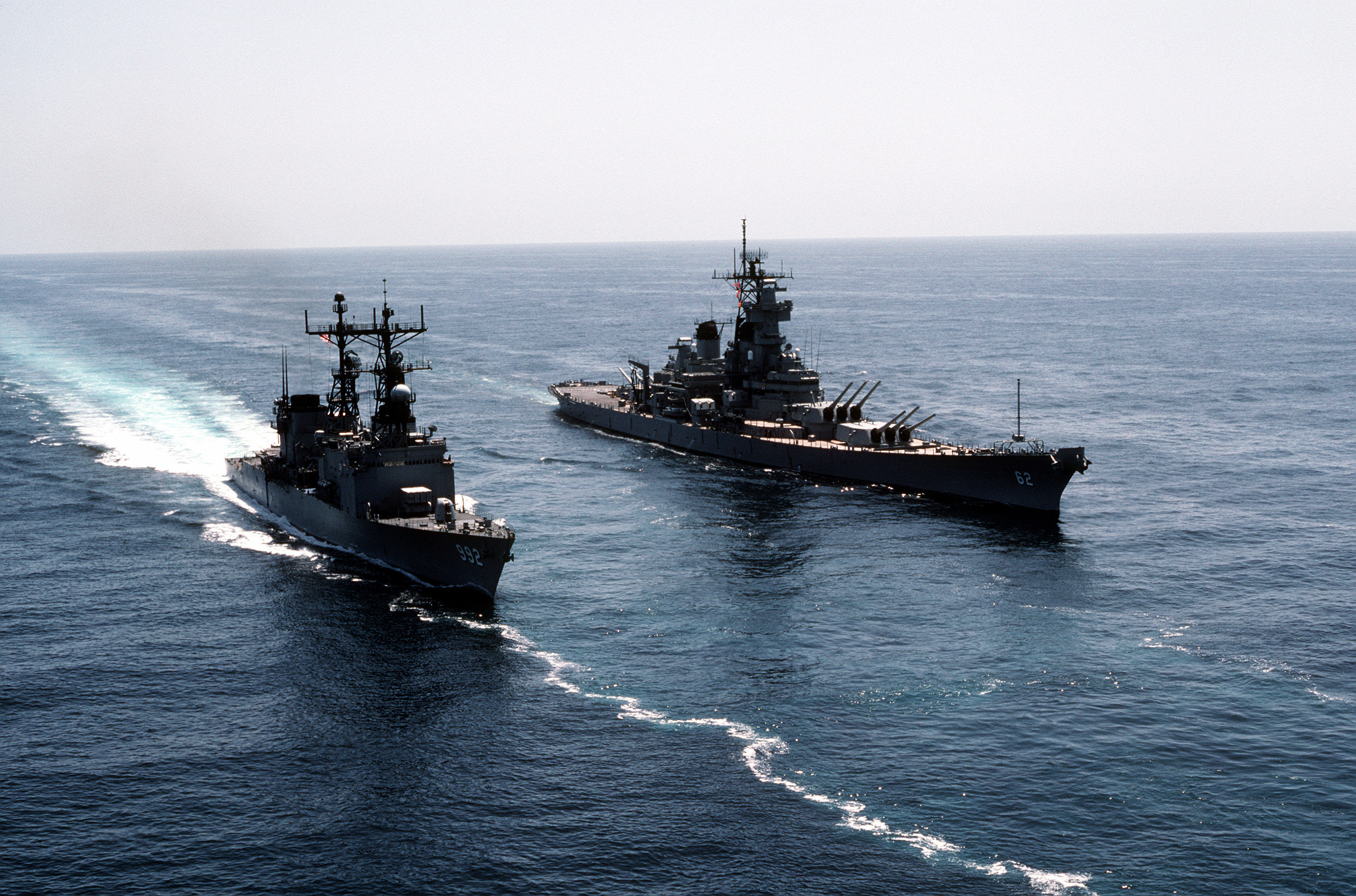
New Jersey cruising off the coast of California alongside the destroyer Fletcher prior to her deployment to the Mediterranean

In 1983, a bloody civil war was raging in Lebanon. To stop the violence in the region, a multinational force of peacekeepers composed largely of U.S., Italian, and French armed-services members was created and sent to the region to attempt a restoration of order. As part of the multinational force, the United States mobilized an expeditionary force composed of members of the United States Marine Corps and elements of the U.S. Sixth Fleet, which operated out of the Mediterranean.

On 18 April 1983, a van, carrying a 2,000 pound load of explosives, slammed into the U.S. embassy in West Beirut, killing 63. In August 1983, Israel withdrew its Defense Forces from the Chouf District (southeast of Beirut), thus removing the buffer between the Druze and the Christian militias, triggering another round of brutal fighting. In August 1983, militiamen began to bombard U.S. Marine positions near Beirut International Airport with mortar and rocket fire as the Lebanese Army fought Druze and Shia forces in the southern suburbs of Beirut. On 29 August 1983, two Marines were killed and 14 were wounded; in the ensuing months, the Marines came under almost daily attack from artillery, mortar, rocket, and small-arms fire. After this attack, the Marines began returning fire. The Reagan Administration decided to dispatch New Jersey, which the Marines cheered.

On 16 September 1983, Druze forces massed on the threshold of Suk El Gharb, a village defended by the Lebanese Army. The village had strategic importance; the militias coming up from the south had to traverse Suk El Gharb to get to the Beirut–Aley road. Moreover, Suk El Gharb controlled a ridge that overlooked Baabda, Yarze, which was the location of the Ministry of Defence and East Beirut. From that ridge, the militia gunners could shoot directly downhill at those locations with artillery. USN warships shelled Druze positions and helped the Lebanese Army hold the town of Suk El Gharb until a cease-fire was declared on 25 September, the day New Jersey arrived on the scene. The arrival of New Jersey was one of several factors contributing to a reduction in the number of attacks on the Marines.

On 28 November—after the 23 October 1983 Beirut barracks bombing—the U.S. government announced that New Jersey would remain off Beirut, although her crew would be rotated. On 14 December, New Jersey fired 11 projectiles from her 16-inch (406 mm) guns at hostile positions inland of Beirut. These were the first 16-inch shells fired for effect anywhere in the world since New Jersey ended her time on the gun line in Vietnam in 1969.

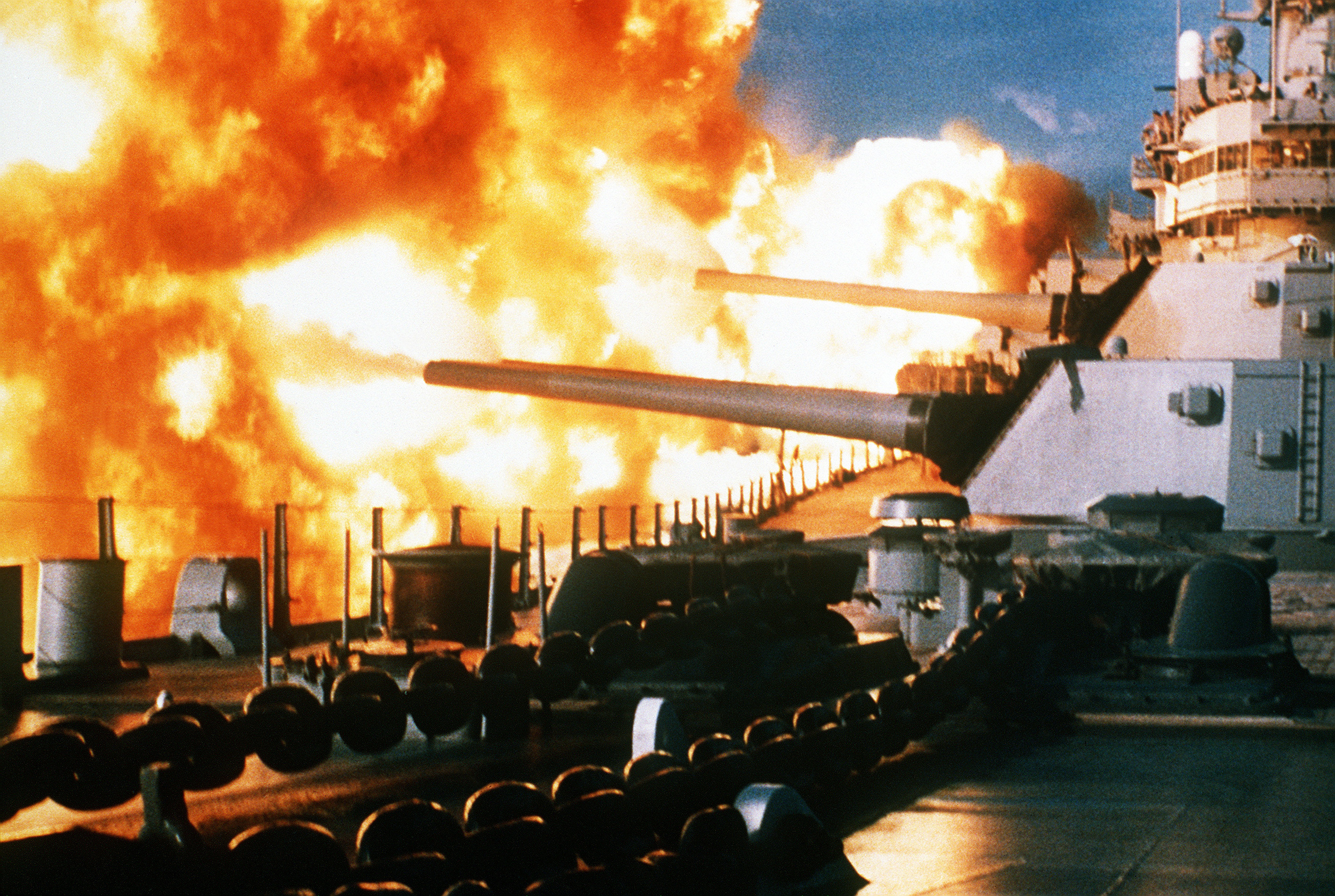
New Jersey opened fire on an enemy position from off the coast of Beirut on January 9, 1984.

This shelling was in response to attacks on U.S. reconnaissance planes by Syrian/Druze AA batteries.

Carrying on a tradition he had begun in World War II of spending Christmas with U.S. forces overseas, Bob Hope and his troupe of entertainers gave a show aboard the New Jersey on 24 December 1983. About 400 Marines stationed in Beirut attended the show. On 8 February 1984, New Jersey fired almost 300 shells at Druze and Shi'ite positions in the hills overlooking Beirut. Some 30 of these massive projectiles rained down on a Syrian command post in the Bekaa Valley east of Beirut, killing the general commanding Syrian forces in Lebanon and several other senior officers. This was the heaviest shore bombardment since the Korean War.

Although New Jersey performed her job expertly during the intervention in Lebanon, some have criticized the decision to have New Jersey shell Druze and Syrian forces. Members of this camp allege that this action forced a shift in the previously neutral U.S. forces by convincing local Lebanese Muslims that the U.S. had taken the Christian side; New Jersey's shells had killed hundreds of people, mostly Shiites and Druze. In his memoir, General Colin Powell (at the time an assistant to Caspar Weinberger) noted, "When the shells started falling on the Shiites, they assumed the American 'referee' had taken sides."

The accuracy of New Jersey's guns was also called into question. An investigation into New Jersey's gunfire effectiveness in Lebanon, led by Marine Colonel Don Price, found that many of the ship's shells had missed their targets by as much as 10,000 yards (9,140 m), so may have inadvertently killed civilians. Tim McNulty, a correspondent for the Chicago Tribune based in Lebanon, said, "Everybody loved the New Jersey until she fired her guns. Once she fired, it was obvious she couldn't hit anything." The inaccuracy is believed to have resulted because the ship's main gunpowder had been remixed by the USN, under the direction of Captain Joseph Dominick Miceli at the Naval Weapons Support Center, and rebagged. Powder lots (individual production runs of powder) burn at different rates. Therefore, remixing the powder lots could cause the guns to fire inconsistently. The problem was apparently resolved after the USN was able to locate additional powder supplies that had not been remixed.

== After the Lebanese deployment (1984–1990) ==
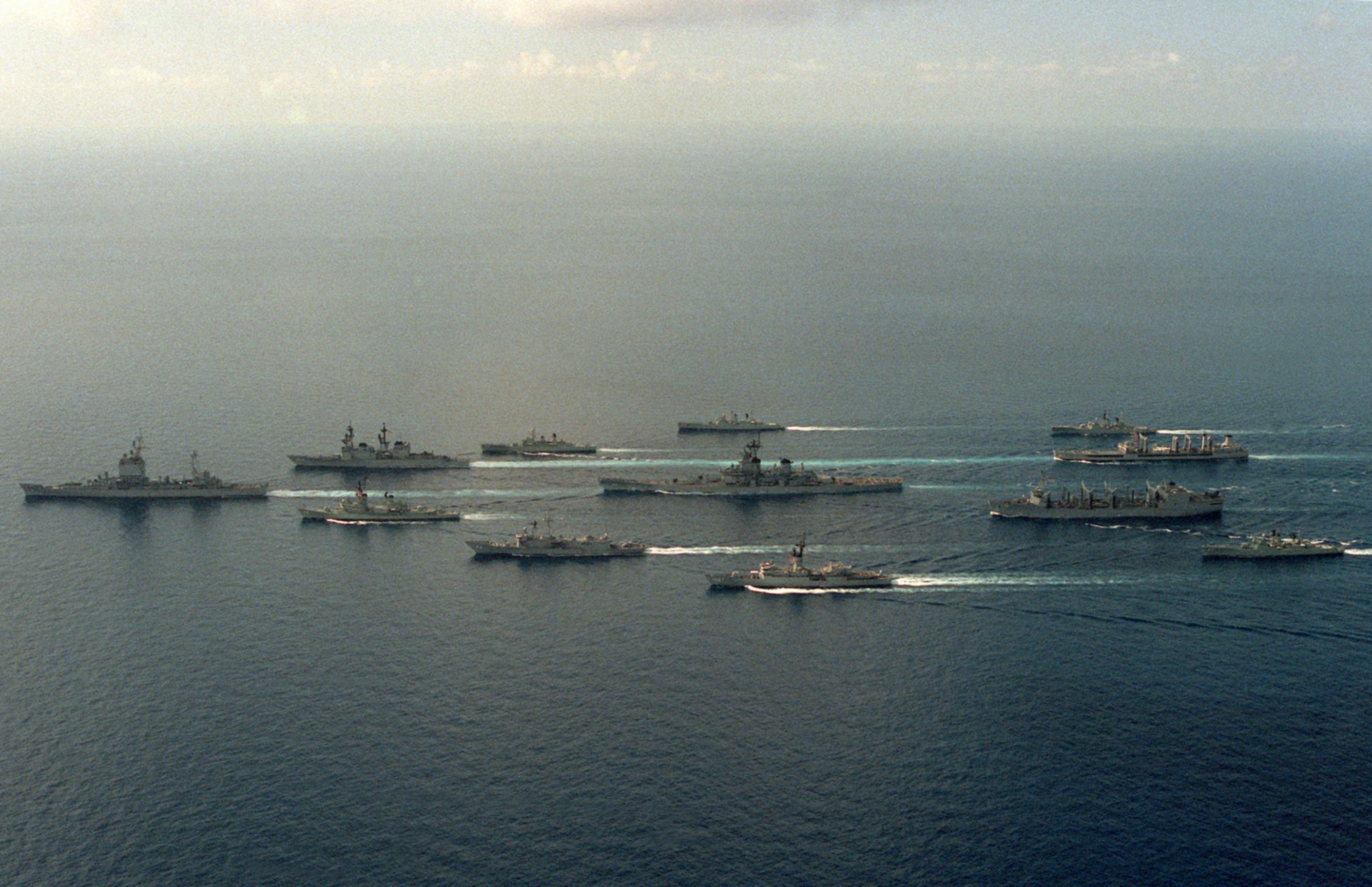
New Jersey battle group, July 1, 1986

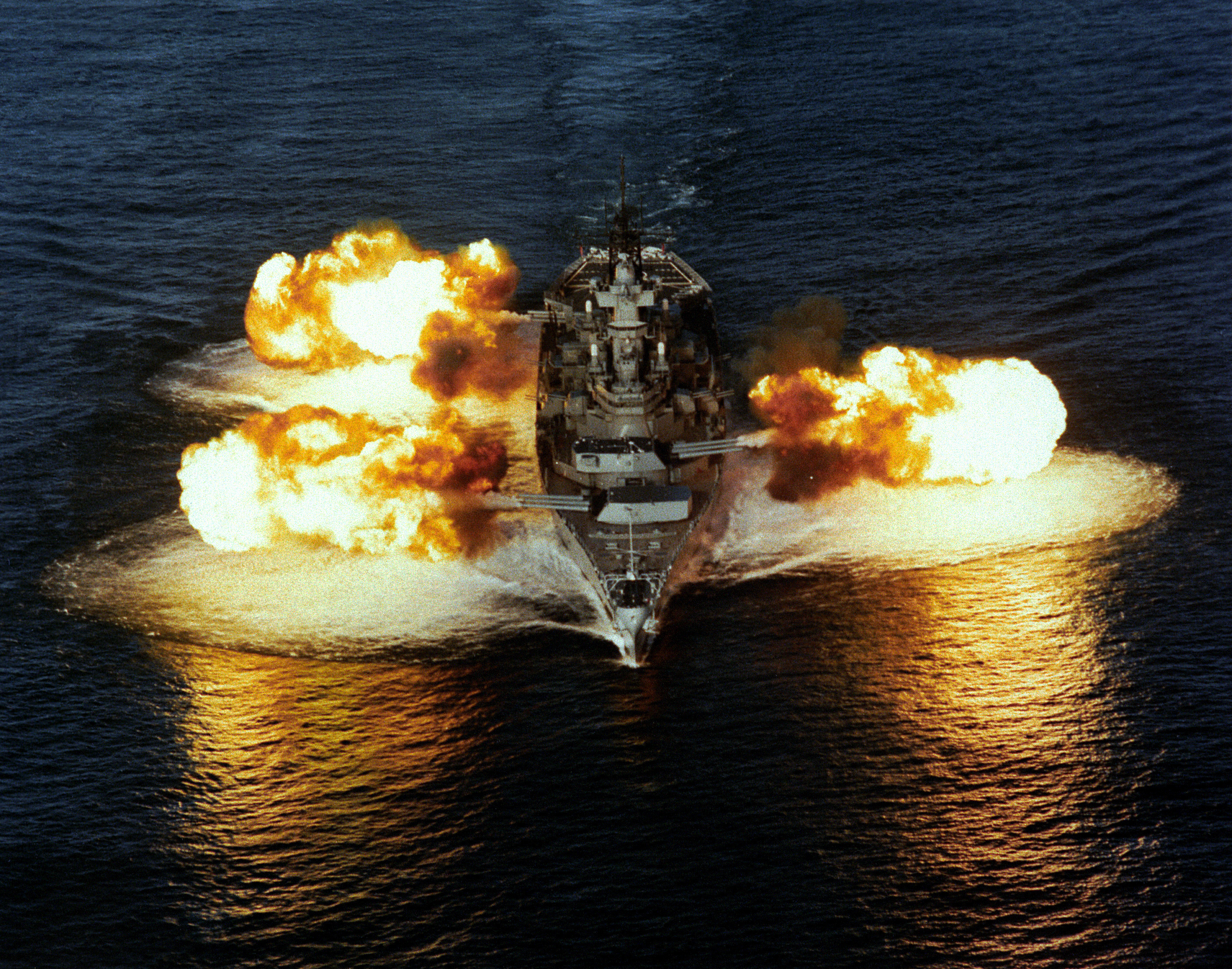
New Jersey fired all her main guns, December 1986.

In 1986, New Jersey began her next deployment, this time operating as part of the Pacific Fleet and as the centerpiece of her own battle group. Designated Battle Group Romeo, her escorts included the cruiser USS Long Beach, destroyer USS Merrill, frigates USS Copeland and USS Thach, and replenishment oiler USS Wabash. This was first time that New Jersey had operational control of her own group of escorts since the Korean War, and she cruised from Hawaii to Thailand in 1986, freeing up U.S. aircraft carriers for other missions and in the process becoming the only major U.S. naval presence in the region from May to October. Although in command of her own battleship battlegroup, New Jersey did sail with the aircraft carriers USS Ranger (CV-61) and USS Constellation (CV-64) and USS Thach (FFG-43) while deployed in 1986.

According to a declassified command history for the nuclear-armed battleship New Jersey, during her transit through the Sea of Okhotsk on 27–28 September 1986, "close passes" were made by Soviet Bear and Badger bombers, a Hormone helicopter, and a May maritime patrol airplane. A Kara-class cruiser and two Grisha III frigates also shadowed the U.S. ships. The maneuver, according to the command history, "marked the first time a U.S. battleship had operated in the Soviet Navy's backyard." Following an overhaul at Long Beach, which lasted into 1988, New Jersey returned to the Pacific Ocean, this time operating as part of a surface action group. The battleship operated near the coast of Korea prior to the opening of the 1988 Summer Olympics in Seoul, South Korea, then departed for Australia to participate in the Australian bicentennial celebrations.

In April 1989, as New Jersey was preparing for her last operational cruise, sister ship Iowa suffered a catastrophic explosion in her number-two gun turret. Fallout from the incident led USN officials to freeze live-fire exercises with the guns until the investigation into the explosion was concluded. Eventually, the ban was lifted, and New Jersey was allowed to use her big guns again. New Jersey's final cruise began in 1989 as part of Pacific Exercise '89. Upon completion of the exercise, New Jersey sailed through the Indian Ocean and into the Persian Gulf, in the process becoming the centerpiece for various battle groups and surface action groups. New Jersey remained in the Persian Gulf for the rest of the year, returning to the U.S. in February 1990.

== Reserve fleet and museum ship (1991–present) ==
- USS New Jersey (BB-62)
- U.S. National Register of Historic Places
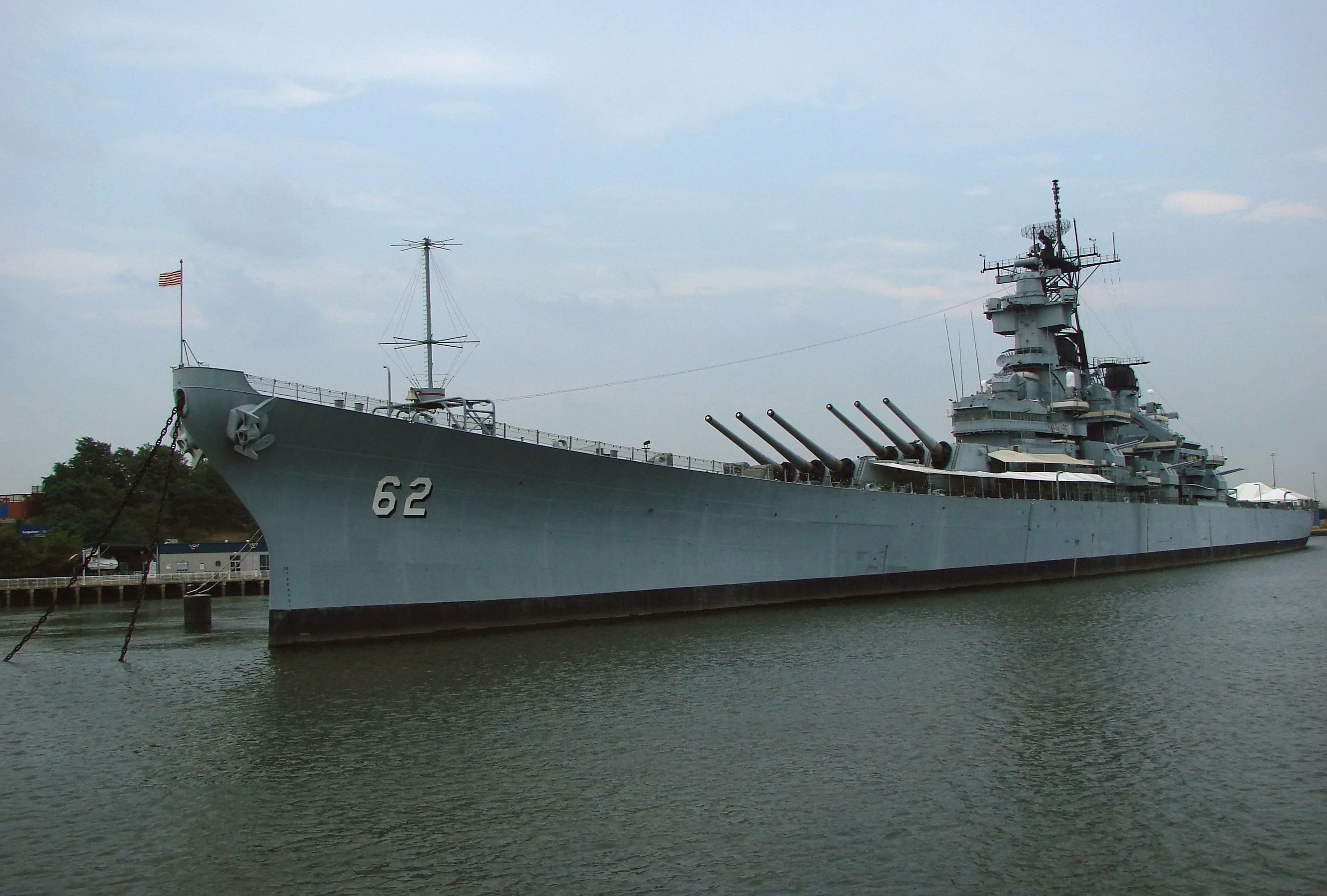
- Overview of the ship from a river ferry

- Location within Camden County, New Jersey
- Location: 62 Battleship Place; Camden, New Jersey
- Coordinates: 39°56′21″N 75°7′58″W
- Built: 1942
- Architect: U.S. Navy
- NRHP reference No.: 04000980
- Added to NRHP: 17 September 2004

With the collapse of the Soviet Union in the early 1990s and the lack of a perceived threat against the U.S. came drastic cuts to the defense budget, and the high cost of maintaining battleships as part of the active fleet became uneconomical; as a result, New Jersey was decommissioned for the final time at Naval Station Long Beach, California, on 8 February 1991, with the ship serving a total of 21 years (the most of the four Iowa ships) in active service. The decision to decommission New Jersey robbed the battleship of the chance to participate in Operation Desert Storm in 1991, a military campaign to forcibly remove Iraqi troops from Kuwait. Hostilities had commenced on or about 15 January 1991 and sister ships Missouri and Wisconsin were engaging Iraqi targets with Tomahawk missiles at the time of New Jersey's decommissioning. Following her decommissioning, New Jersey was towed to Bremerton, Washington, where she remained in reserve until struck from the Naval Vessel Register in January 1995.

Section 1011 of the National Defense Authorization Act of 1996 required the USN to reinstate to the Naval Vessel Register two of the Iowa-class battleships that had been struck in 1995; these ships were to be maintained in the USN reserve fleets (or "mothball fleet"). The USN was to ensure that both of the reinstated battleships were in good condition and could be reactivated for use in the Marine Corps' amphibious operations. Due to Iowa's damaged turret 2, the USN selected New Jersey for placement into the mothball fleet, though some claimed that the training mechanisms on New Jersey's 16-inch guns had been welded down (when in fact it was only the turret locking pins). The cost to fix New Jersey was considered less than the cost to fix Iowa; as a result, New Jersey and Wisconsin were reinstated to the Naval Vessel Register and placed back in the reserve fleet.

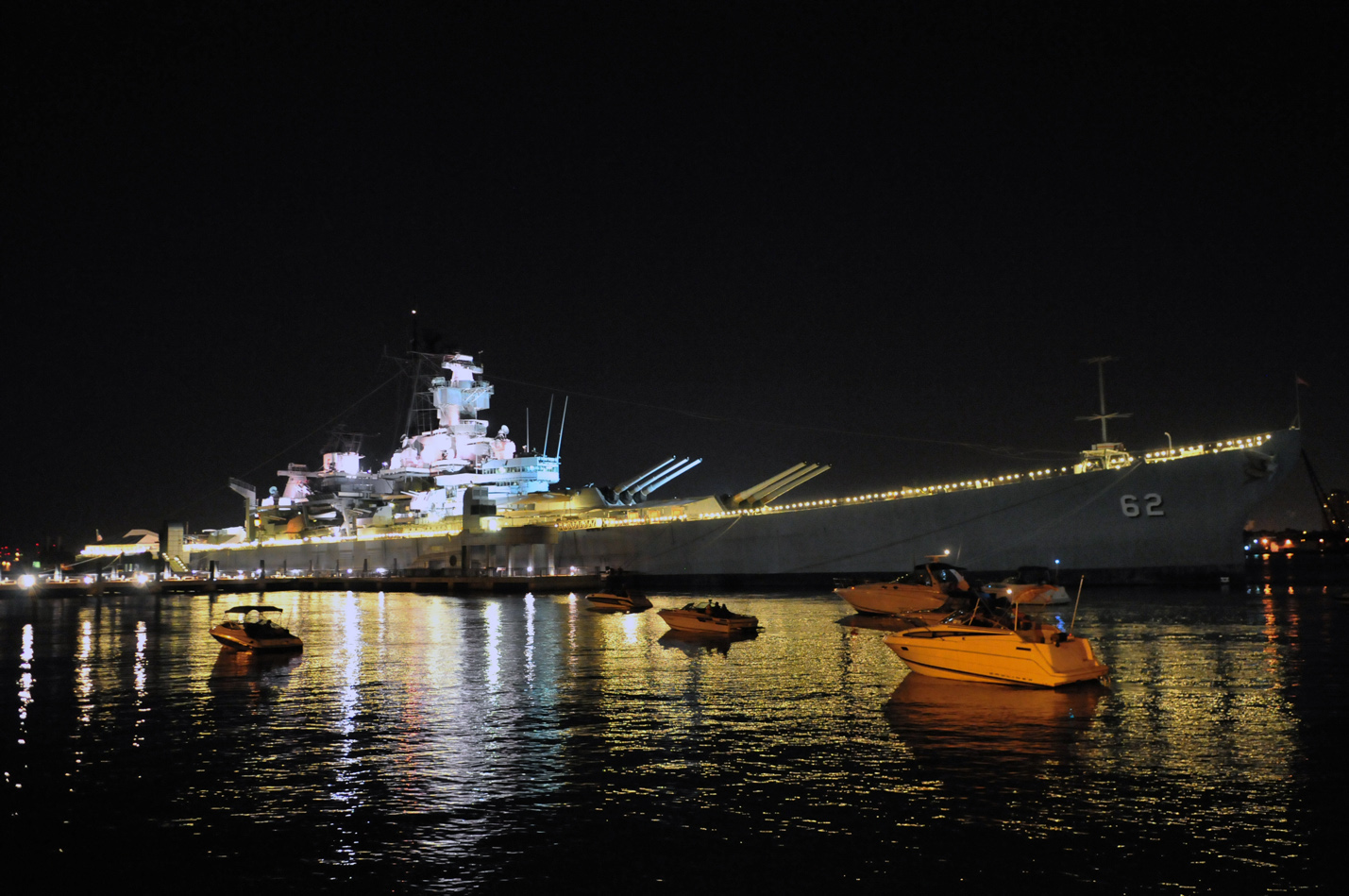
New Jersey at her berth in Camden at night, September 2010

The New Jersey remained in the mothball fleet until the Strom Thurmond National Defense Authorization Act of 1999 passed through the United States Congress on 18 October 1998. Section 1011 required the U.S. Secretary of the Navy (SecNav) to list and maintain Iowa and Wisconsin on the Naval Vessel Register, while Section 1012 required the SecNav to strike New Jersey from the Naval Vessel Register and transfer the battleship to a not-for-profit entity in accordance with section 7306 of Title 10, United States Code. Section 1012 also required the transferee to locate the battleship in New Jersey. The USN made the switch in January 1999, and on 12 September, New Jersey was towed by the tug Sea Victory from Bremerton, Washington, to Philadelphia for restoration work in the Philadelphia Naval Shipyard in advance of her planned donation for use as a museum.

Two competing requests for the battleships were filed, one by the USS New Jersey Battleship Commission of Bayonne, New Jersey, and one by the Home Port Alliance of Camden, New Jersey. Both teams submitted plans to operate and maintain the battleship as a museum. After a review of both plans, the USN selected the Home Port Alliance as the battleship's final resting place. SecNav Richard Danzig made the announcement on 20 January 2000, and on 15 October of that year, New Jersey arrived at her final resting place on the Camden Waterfront.

=== Opened to the public ===
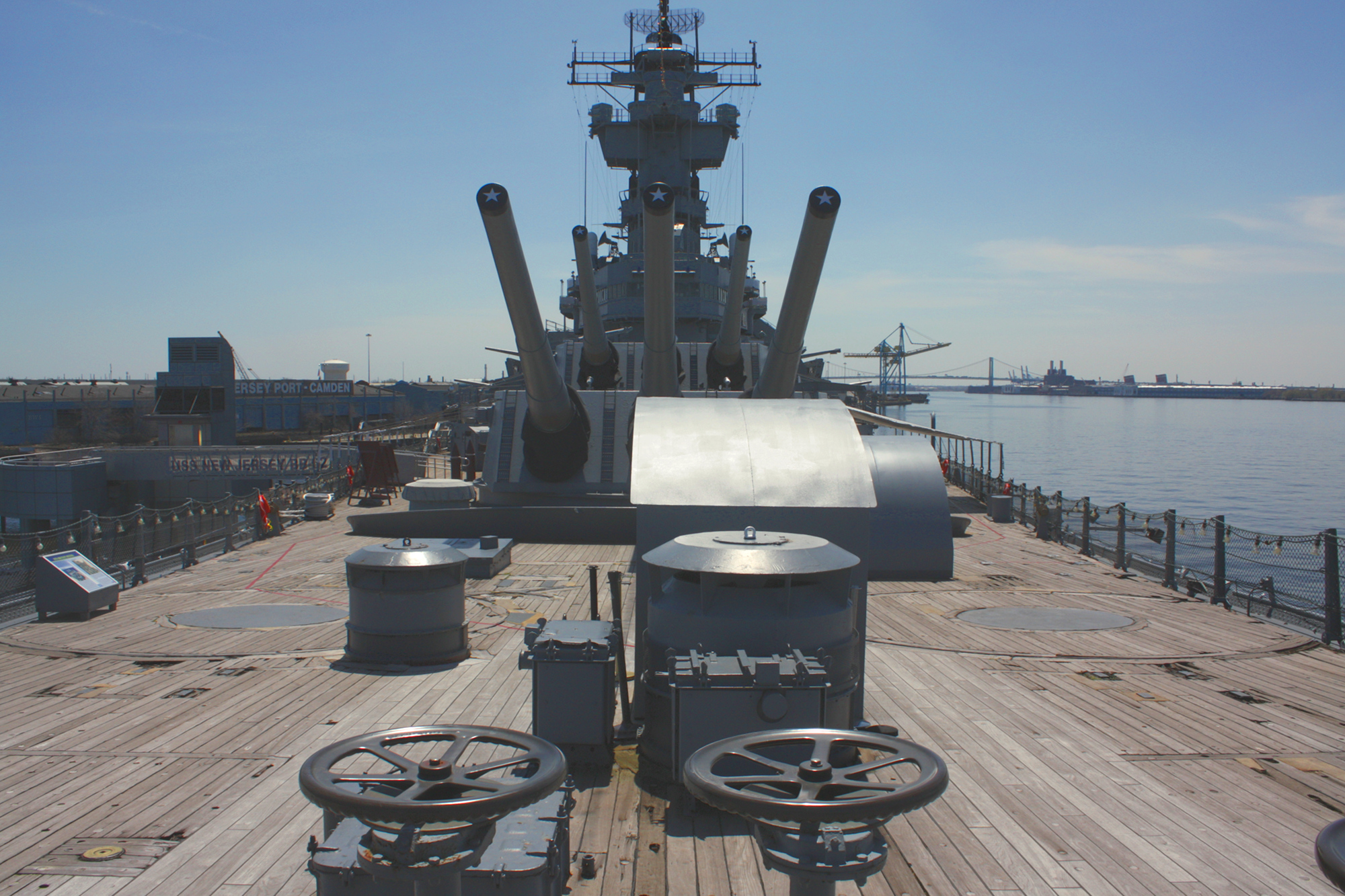
Detail of teak deck and forward guns, Camden, 2018

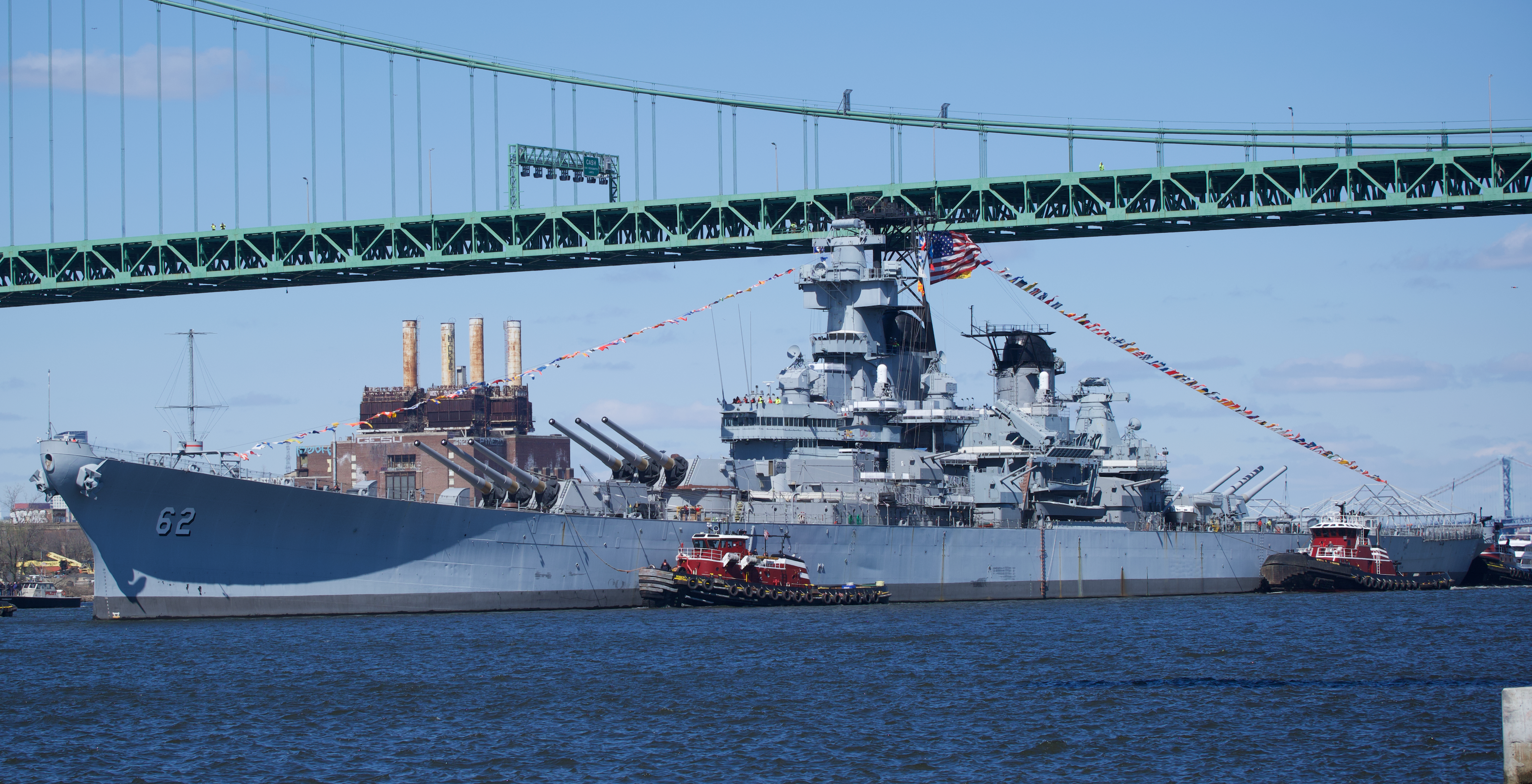
New Jersey under tow below the Walt Whitman Bridge en route to Paulsboro, New Jersey, in March 2024

Shortly after her arrival, New Jersey was opened to the public, officially beginning her new career as a museum ship with the name Battleship New Jersey Museum and Memorial. Self-guided tours, guided group tours, and overnight encampments are offered on the floating museum. Overnight encampments, often for the benefit of scouting organizations, offer the opportunity to sleep and eat in the original berths and mess decks.

New Jersey has been placed on several historic registers. In 1997, while the ship was still in the mothball fleet, the New Jersey State Review Board for Historic Sites recommended that she "be listed in the New Jersey Register of Historic Places, contingent upon the transfer of the battleship to New Jersey waters." In 2004, the State of New Jersey officially designated the battleship as an historical place. This cleared New Jersey for placement on the National Register of Historic Places, to which New Jersey was officially added in 2004.

In 2012, another nonprofit, the USS New Jersey Battleship Foundation, Inc., advocated that New Jersey should be moved to Liberty State Park. Ultimately, nothing came from that effort and the ship remains in Camden. One of USS New Jersey's original gun barrels from 1943 to 1954 now sits on the northwest corner of the Marine Parade Grounds alongside Broad Street and Intrepid Avenue in Philadelphia. Another original gun barrel is located in Camden, next to USS New Jersey, and a third is on display in Basking Ridge, New Jersey. A propeller is on display in front of Naval Weapons Station Earle, in Colts Neck, New Jersey. The museum also operates a YouTube channel where curators educate viewers on various historical details, facts, and the service history of the ship.

In the spring of 2024, New Jersey left Camden and went downriver to Philadelphia to enter drydock at Drydock Number 3 at the Philadelphia Naval Shipyard, the same drydock where she underwent final assembly in 1943. The purpose of the drydock refit, with its estimated cost of $10 million, was to conduct crucial preservation work, as New Jersey had not gone into drydock since her decommissioning. While drydocked from 27 March to 14 June, the underwater portion of the hull was pressure-washed down to bare steel and repainted with several coats, leaks were repaired, seams in the hull's riveted steel plates were caulked, anodes for cathodic protection were replaced, sections of the hull that had rusted thin were reinforced with extra steel, and some hull openings, such as where the propeller shafts pass through, were closed off.

In 2025, New Jersey was chosen to host a two-day live event celebrating the seventh anniversary of the English/worldwide release of Azur Lane, a mobile game that features anthropomorphic "shipgirls" including New Jersey herself, who is a popular character.

== Awards ==
New Jersey earned nine battle stars for her World War II service, four for the Korean War, three for the Vietnam War, and three for action in Lebanon and the Persian Gulf region. Among other awards, she received the Navy Unit Commendation for Vietnam and Lebanon service, the Presidential Unit Citation from the Republic of the Philippines, and the Presidential Unit Citation from the Republic of Korea. Based on these, New Jersey is the most decorated battleship in US history.

Combat Action Ribbon with 1 star	Navy Unit Commendation with 1 star	Navy E Ribbon with 2 Battle Es	Navy Expeditionary Medal
China Service Medal	American Campaign Medal	Asiatic-Pacific Campaign Medal with 9 battle stars	World War II Victory Medal
Navy Occupation Service Medal with "ASIA" clasp	National Defense Service Medal with 2 stars	Korean Service Medal with 4 battle stars	Armed Forces Expeditionary Medal with 1 star
Vietnam Service Medal with 3 stars	Navy Sea Service Deployment Ribbon with 3 stars	Philippine Presidential Unit Citation	Korean Presidential Unit Citation
Vietnam Cross of Gallantry	Philippine Liberation Medal with 2 stars	United Nations Korea Medal	Vietnam Campaign Medal

== See also ==
- List of broadsides of major World War II ships
- List of museum ships
- Drydock Tour: https://www.youtube.com/watch?v=uruR7nr2JUg&list=PLcj4c_-vfQjgHF0S-_R10B89uvJCKJkLU&index=17
