= Battleship New Jersey Museum and Memorial =

Museum in Camden, New Jersey

Coordinates: 39.9394°N 75.1331°W

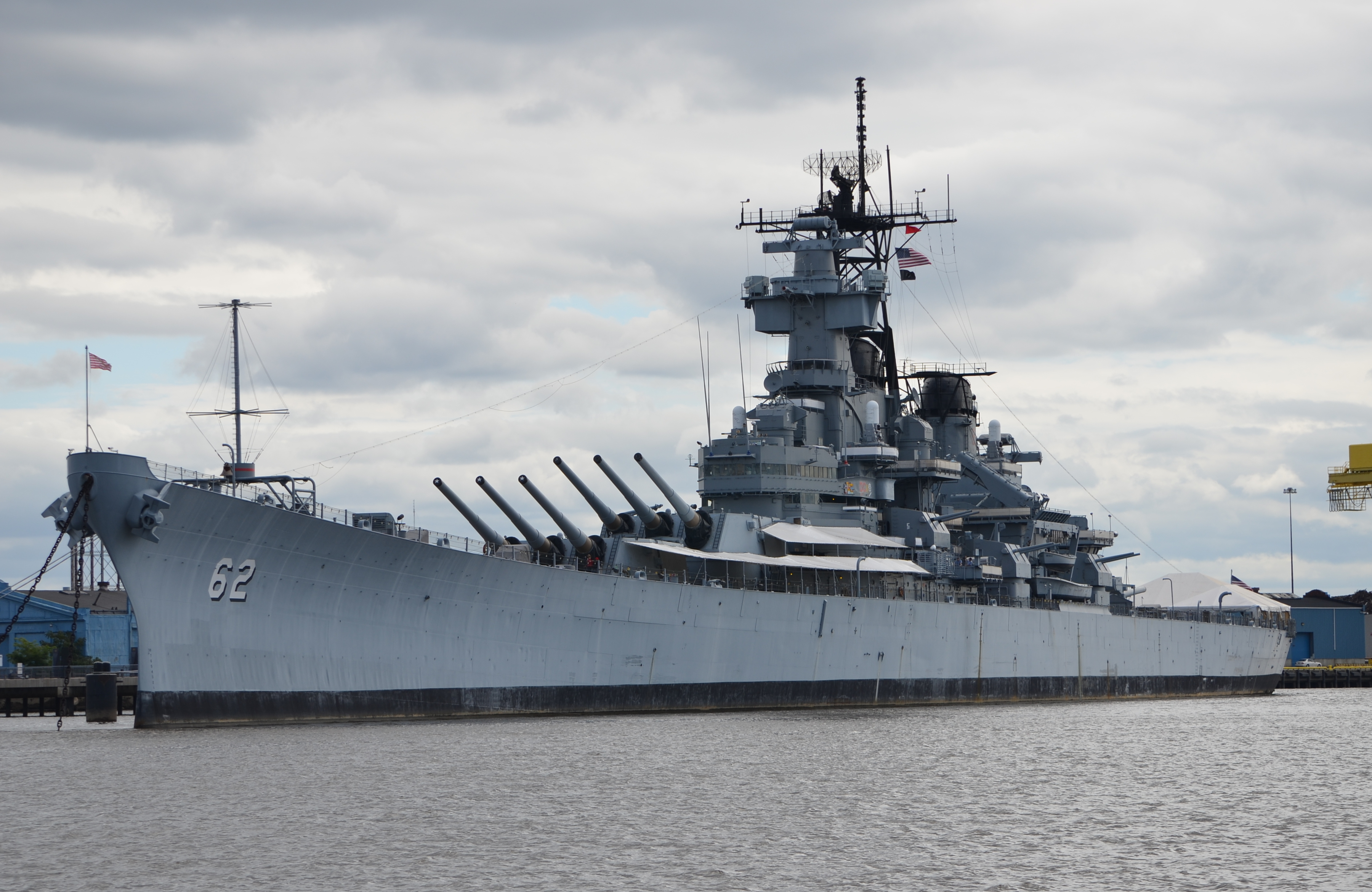
- USS New Jersey in Camden, New Jersey, July 2011
- Established: October 2001 (opened as a museum)
- Location: 62 Battleship Place; Camden, New Jersey, United States
- Type: History
- Director: Marshall Spevak
- Chairperson: Lisa Conte
- Curator: Ryan Szimanski
- Public transit access: Entertainment Center
- Website: Battleship New Jersey Museum and Memorial

The Battleship New Jersey Museum and Memorial is located at 62 Battleship Place, Camden, New Jersey. This museum ship preserves and displays USS New Jersey, the most decorated battleship to have served in the U.S. Navy and one of the largest ever built.

== History ==
in February 1991, USS New Jersey was retired and sent to Bremerton, Washington to serve as one of the many mothball ships, effectively making the battleship a backup in case of an emergency. After being on and off the Naval Registry for another seven years, the battleship was approved by the United States Congress to be swapped with USS Iowa on the Naval Registry. USS New Jersey was slated to go to one of three sites in New Jersey: Bayonne, Jersey City, or Camden which would be chosen by the Battleship Commission. On February 3, 1999, Jersey City decided to not submit a proposal to obtain the battleship, citing unity with Bayonne and concerns about the expense of getting the battleship properly stationed there. Bayonne became a front runner to Battleship Commission chairman Joseph Azzolina, who stated that the Bayonne and Jersey City proposal would have a higher chance at attracting tourist than in Camden. Camden countered, offering four million dollars to convert the battleship into a museum if the battleship were to come to Camden. Camden wanted the battleship to enhance the waterfront and also because so many of the people who worked on building the battleship had lived in the South Jersey and Pennsylvania area.

On September 10, 1999, the Battleship Commission selected Bayonne as the site for the battleship New Jersey. People from South Jersey were not pleased with the ruling, as many of the people who voted on where the battleship would end up were from North Jersey. The commission decided that the Navy would decide where the battleship will end up. On November 11, 1999, the battleship arrived in Philadelphia after being transported from Washington. The arrival into Philadelphia was scheduled to be temporary and would be moved to either Camden or Bayonne once a place was finalized. On January 21, 2000, the Navy decided that Camden would host the battleship due to many factors, including a much more detailed plan by Camden about what they would do with the battleship, the money that Camden was willing to donate to the battleship, and concern that Intrepid, another museum ship, would be overshadowed by the battleship. Congress had 30 days to reverse the decision for the battleship to go to Camden, but ultimately decided to agree with the Navy.

On February 7, 2001, the battleship received approval to the pier changes they wished to implement, but they still needed to be given an exception to dredge the area during the spring fish mating season. On May 8, 2001, the United States Army Corps of Engineers approved the dredging of the Delaware River in order to have the battleship stationed at the new dock. The ship needed 35 feet (11 m) of depth clearance in order to fit. Excess dredging materials went to a disposal facility in the town of National Park in Gloucester County.

Walkway access to the museum

Originally, the museum was planning to open Labor Day weekend, but was ultimately delayed due to Tropical Storm Barry delaying a shipment of materials for the battleship. Opening day was delayed to October 15, 2001. The museum ran tour groups of 15 people that lasted 90–120 minutes and covered 7 decks of the ship. The museum expected to have 1,500 people per day during the first few opening days. Within the first couple of days, most reviews were positive, however some were not happy with the touring situation. Some wished that people were allowed to explore the museum on their own without needing to be on a tour.

Since August 2017 the museum has been operating a YouTube channel that, as of 2025, has over 270 thousand subscribers and posts videos on a regular basis.

In 2025, New Jersey was chosen to host a two-day live event celebrating the 7th anniversary of the English/worldwide release of Azur Lane, a mobile game that features anthropomorphic "shipgirls" including New Jersey herself, who is a popular character.

== Exhibits ==
- Mark 2, 40 mm quad gun mount: Gun mount used between 1939 and 1950. Used as intermediate anti-aircraft weapon
- Mark 2, 40 mm single gun mount: Gun mount used between 1939 and 1950. Used as a close range anti-aircraft weapon

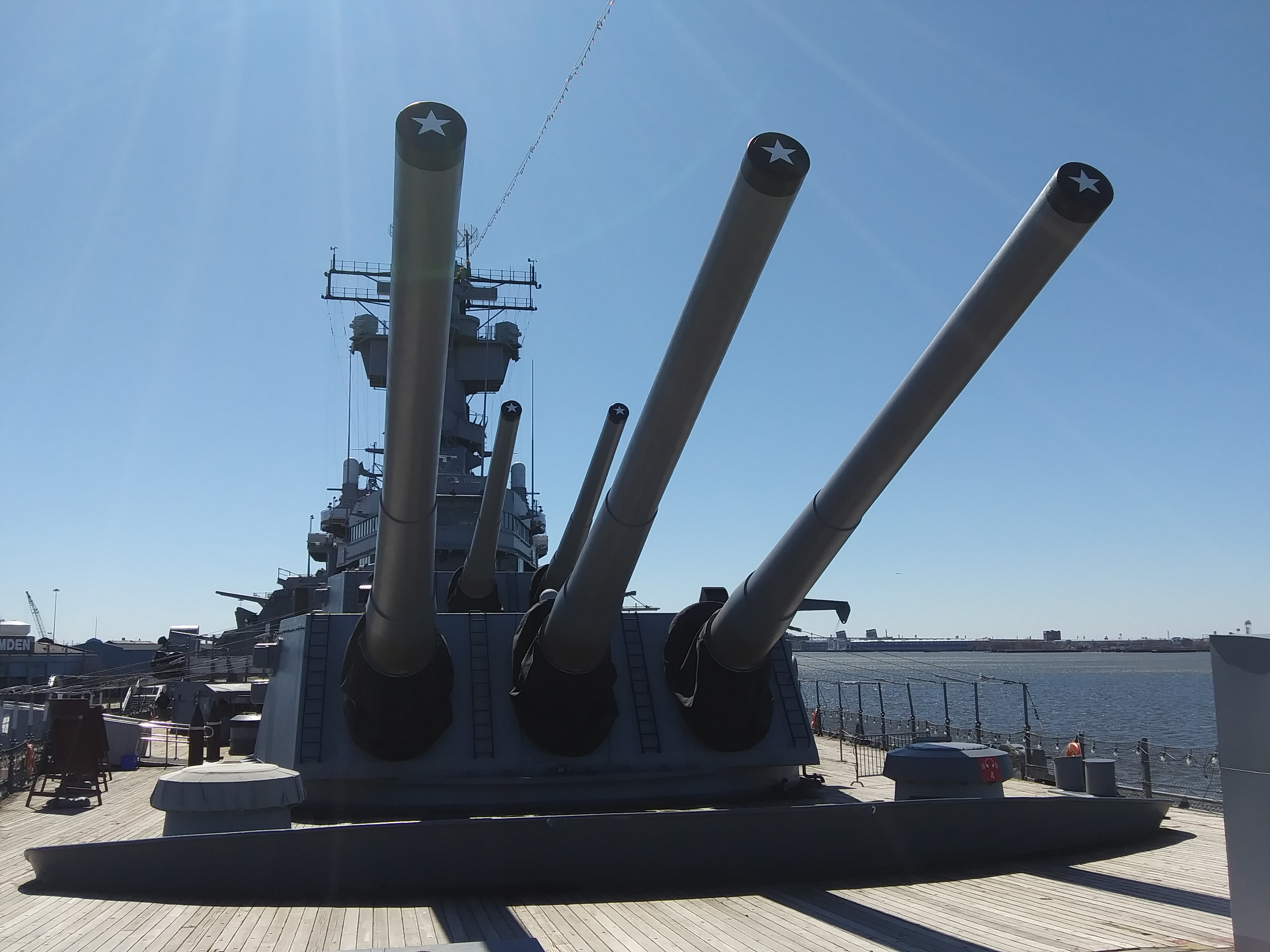
A triple 16-inch/50-caliber Mark 7 gun turret aboard USS New Jersey

- Mark 28 5-inch/38-caliber gun mount: Gun mount used against all targets
- Mark 15 20 mm Phalanx: Gun mount used against missile attacks
- BGM-109 Tomahawk cruise missiles: Contained 32 missiles
- RGM-84 Harpoon cruise missiles: Missiles used against ships
- 16-inch/50-caliber Mark 7 gun: Gun mount used against ships and for shore bombardment
- Crew's Quarters
- Radio Control Room
- Radar Room
- Senior Staff Cabin

== Donations ==
A Little Slice of New York, Georgetti Market, and Finnaren & Haley, and Williams Gas Pipeline-Transco of Houston donated pizzas, sandwiches, paint, and cathodic protection respectively toward the restoration effort. Prior to opening, the battleship looked for volunteers to help lead guided tours of the battleship. Over 90,000 hours of donated time went into getting the museum ready for opening day. After opening, Vector Security, Radionics, and Interlogix donated alarm system and security devices totaling more than $50,000.

== Renovations ==
L3 Communications and Lockheed Martin helped to restore the ship's intercom system and donated money for the battleship to print and distribute brochures for the battleship.

In March 2024 the ship left its home port in Camden for Philadelphia Naval Shipyard and underwent a major dry-docking renovation that lasted 78 days.

== See also ==
- U.S. Navy memorials
- U.S. Navy museums (and other battleship museums)
- List of maritime museums in the United States
- List of battleships of the United States Navy
- List of museums in New Jersey
