= J. Edward Snyder =

US Navy officer (1924–2007)

J. Edward Snyder Jr.
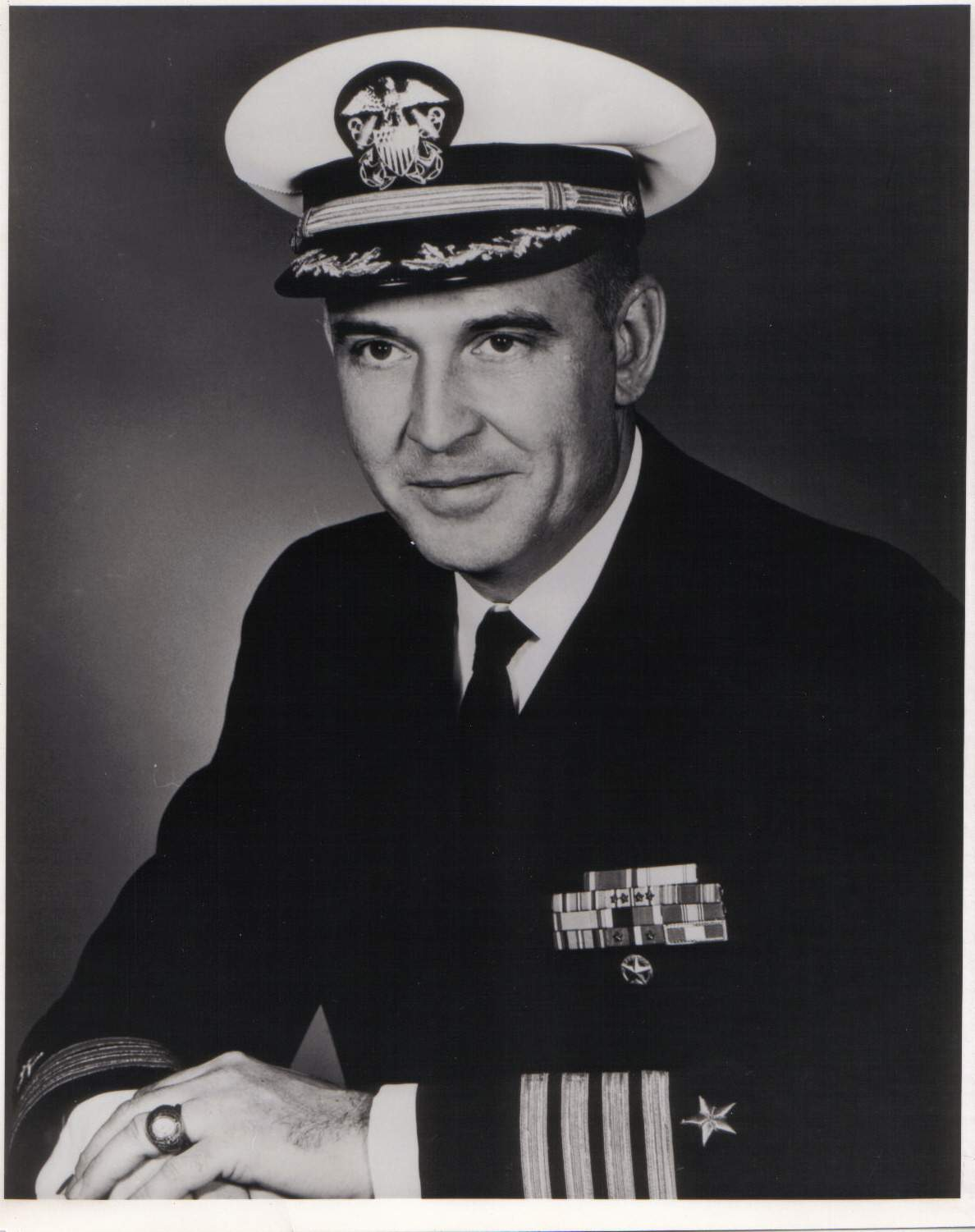
- J. Edward Snyder Jr.
- Born: October 23, 1924; Grand Forks, North Dakota
- Died: November 4, 2007 (aged 83); Bethesda, Maryland
- Burial place: Arlington National Cemetery
- Military career
- Allegiance: United States of America
- Branch: United States Navy
- Service years: 1941–1980
- Rank: Rear Admiral
- Commands: USS Calcaterra; USS Brownson; USS New Jersey; Training Command, Atlantic Fleet; Naval Meteorology and Oceanography Command
- Conflicts: World War II; Korean War; Vietnam War
- Awards: Legion of Merit; Meritorious Service Medal

Rear Adm. J. Edward Snyder, USN (Ret.) (October 23, 1924 – November 4, 2007) was notable as the captain of the battleship USS New Jersey during that ship's deployment to the Vietnam War in 1968. Considered by those serving on the New Jersey to be a "sailor's captain," Captain Snyder was able to motivate his men through his more relaxed shipboard policies.

Snyder was also known for his wry sense of humor. While deployed off Vietnam, the USS New Jersey encountered a small US Navy ship. Fearing that the unidentified vessel was a North Vietnamese gunboat, the commanding officer of the smaller ship flashed a message to the New Jersey using its signal lamp, ordering the battleship to identify itself or be fired upon. In response, Snyder ordered that the largest signal lamp aboard be used to identify the ship and relay the message, replete with pun, "OPEN FIRE WHEN READY. FEAR GOD. DREADNOUGHT."

Snyder also sought to cultivate a wider sense of mission. He brought ground troops aboard the New Jersey for weekend liberty, earning the ship the nickname "The New Jersey Hilton." Told to stop the "unauthorized public relations stunt" by DoD, Snyder sternly responded, noting that he had notified the Pentagon, and that it was no stunt. Instead, it was meant to give the ground troops a respite from the war, and remind his men why they were providing gunfire support. He finished his message by disparaging the Pentagon as "Disneyland East," and stating that he had no idea what was going on there, but couldn't care less.

Captain Snyder died on Sunday, November 4, 2007, from pancreatic cancer.

== Awards and decorations ==

Legion of Merit with 3 stars	Meritorious Service Medal	Navy and Marine Corps; Commendation Medal with "V" device
Combat Action Ribbon	Navy Unit Commendation	American Defense Service Medal
Asiatic-Pacific Campaign Medal with 4 stars	World War 2 Victory Medal	Navy Occupation Service Medal
National Defense Service Medal with 1 star	Korean Service Medal	Armed Forces Expeditionary Medal
Vietnam Service Medal with 2 stars	Presidential Unit Citation (Philippines)	Vietnam Gallantry Cross with Palm and Frame
Philippine Liberation Medal with 2 stars	Vietnam Distinguished Service Order	Vietnam Campaign Medal with 60- device
Command at Sea Insignia worn on right breast pocket
