= Robert C. Peniston =

Robert C. Peniston (October 25, 1922 – August 2, 2014) was a career United States Navy officer who rose to the rank of captain and commanded the battleship USS New Jersey.

Born on October 25, 1922, in Chillicothe, Missouri, Peniston attended the University of Wichita, then joined the Navy in 1943.

Peniston graduated with the Class of 1947 from the U.S. Naval Academy. Among other assignments, he served as navigator of the presidential yacht Williamsburg in 1952. He commanded the destroyer escort USS Savage and the guided missile destroyer USS Tattnall. He was the second captain for the recommissioned USS Albany, which was restored to service as a guided missile cruiser on November 9, 1968. He took command of New Jersey on August 27, 1969, and helped decommission her on December 17, 1969, with these words: "Rest well, yet sleep lightly; and hear the call, if again sounded, to provide firepower for freedom." (New Jersey was recommissioned in the 1980s). He retired from the Navy as a captain in 1976.

Along the way, Peniston earned an M.A. from Stanford University in 1958, and also attended the Naval War College.

Peniston became director of the Lee Chapel at Washington and Lee University, retired again, and subsequently began volunteering in the Special Collections section of the college's Leyburn Library, where he transcribed more than 3,000 letters from the library's Robert E. Lee collection and Lee-Jackson Foundation Papers. As well, he occasionally spoke to American History classes at the college.

Peniston died August 2, 2014, in Lexington, Virginia.
