= Ocean View (Vietnam) =

Site information
- Type: Marines
- Condition: abandoned

Location
- Coordinates: 16.9514°N 107.147°E

Site history
- Built: 1967
- In use: 1967-9
- Battles/wars: Vietnam War

Garrison information
- Occupants: 3rd Marine Division

Oceanview was a U.S. Marine Air Naval Gunfire Liaison Company (ANGLICO) observation post located on the coast some 10 km north of the Cua Viet River in Quang Tri Province and just south of the Vietnamese Demilitarized Zone (DMZ). It was a very isolated spot and could be reached only by Amtrac or helicopter.

The primary reasons for its existence were to prevent infiltration of troops through the DMZ into I Corps and to direct counterbattery fire against People's Army of Vietnam (PAVN) artillery. Navy ships would unload supplies at the Cửa Việt Base and these would be taken up the Cua Viet River to Đông Hà Combat Base. Typically ships would begin to unload and PAVN guns would open fire either from North Vietnam or the DMZ. The observers would calculate the PAVN artillery positions and call in the coordinates to Navy ships and then adjust the rounds onto the target.

Oceanview was defended by 32 Marines from the 1st Amphibian Tractor Battalion, plus 11 Army crewmen manning two M42 Dusters from 1st Battalion 44th Artillery, 108th Artillery Group at Đông Hà, assigned to the 3rd Marine Division.

The PAVN attempted to overrun the position at least twice. On 2 August 1968, several squads of PAVN infantry attacked Oceanview, but were driven off by fire from the Amtracs, Dusters and naval gunfire killing eight PAVN. Later that day a platoon of PAVN was seen moving nearby and naval gunfire was again called in, resulting in a further two PAVN killed. On the night of 22 February 1969, an estimated 500 PAVN troops attacked Oceanview. The battleship USS New Jersey was on station nearby and it fired 16 inch and 5 inch rounds over a period of six hours to break up the attack.
