= Sacco and Vanzetti Must Die! =

2006 novel by Mark Binelli

- Cover of the 2006 Dalkey Archive Press edition
- Author: Mark Binelli
- Language: English
- Publisher: Dalkey Archive
- Publication date: 2006
- ISBN: 978-1-56478-445-2 (first edition)
- Dewey Decimal: 813.6
- LC Class: PS3602.I53 S23

Sacco and Vanzetti Must Die! is a 2006 novel by Mark Binelli, published by Dalkey Archive. It is Binelli's first novel.

The main characters, Nic Sacco and Bart Vanzetti, are a Laurel and Hardy-style comedic team that is a re-imagining of Sacco and Vanzetti, with the Sacco character being fat and comedic and the Vanzetti character being the straight man. Therefore the Sacco is "Fatty" and the Vanzetti is "Skinny". The two characters act in silent films and do slapstick comedy. The narrative uses journal entries, excerpts of interviews, and variety shows.

Brendan Driscoll of Booklist wrote that "it’s clear that Binelli’s most abiding intellectual interest is about the social construction of ethnicity." The book also discusses historical memory and public personas. Publishers Weekly wrote that "it takes a long time for Binelli to bring together his counter-tale with its real-life antecedents."

== Reception ==
Rod Smith of Time Out New York wrote that "Binelli falls prey to a few mildly ouch-worthy jokes, but for the most part, he matches hyperkinetic storytelling with an inventive prose style".

Publishers Weekly described the book as "a hefty book, more intellectually satisfying than emotionally so" and concluded that "this is an impressive first outing; ambitious in scope and brimming with sharp-edged black humor."

== See also ==
- Detroit City Is the Place to Be (nonfiction book by Binelli)
