= The Passion of Sacco and Vanzetti =

1931–1932 painting series by Ben Shahn

- Series painting in the Whitney Museum
- Artist: Ben Shahn
- Year: 1931–1932
- Medium: Gouache
- Movement: Social realism
- Subject: Sacco and Vanzetti

Detail of Shahn mural in New Jersey

The Passion of Sacco and Vanzetti is a 1932 painting series by Ben Shahn consisting of 32 gouache paintings of Sacco and Vanzetti .

== Creation ==
Artist Ben Shahn had always wanted to be alive during a time of greatness, such as the crucifixion of Christ. Seeing the public reaction to and honoring of Sacco and Vanzetti's lives, Shahn came to see the event as a "crucifixion" of his own time. He participated in a picket against the execution and grew more convinced of their innocence over time.

Shahn created 23 gouache paintings between 1931 and 1932 in The Passion of Sacco and Vanzetti. They were first exhibited at Downtown Gallery in April 1932.

During the Great Depression, Shahn submitted a mural sketch in 1932 to the Museum of Modern Art based on his Sacco and Vanzetti series, which the museum was purported not to like. They made an offer to purchase the painting if he would withdraw his application. It was later reproduced in the catalog and brought on national tour but only sold years later, in 1949, to the Whitney Museum of American Art's permanent collection.

Shahn resuscitated the mural concept when Syracuse University invited him to create a mural panel series in 1965, which is displayed on the external wall of the university's law school. French artist Gabriel Loire produced the mosaic. The university press published an art book of the murals with reproductions several years later.

== Bibliography ==
- Dilliard, Irving (1969). "The Shoemaker and the Fish Peddler". The American Scholar. 39 (1): 170–177. ISSN 0003-0937. JSTOR 41209739.
