= Sacco and Vanzetti =

Italian American anarchist duo executed by Massachusetts

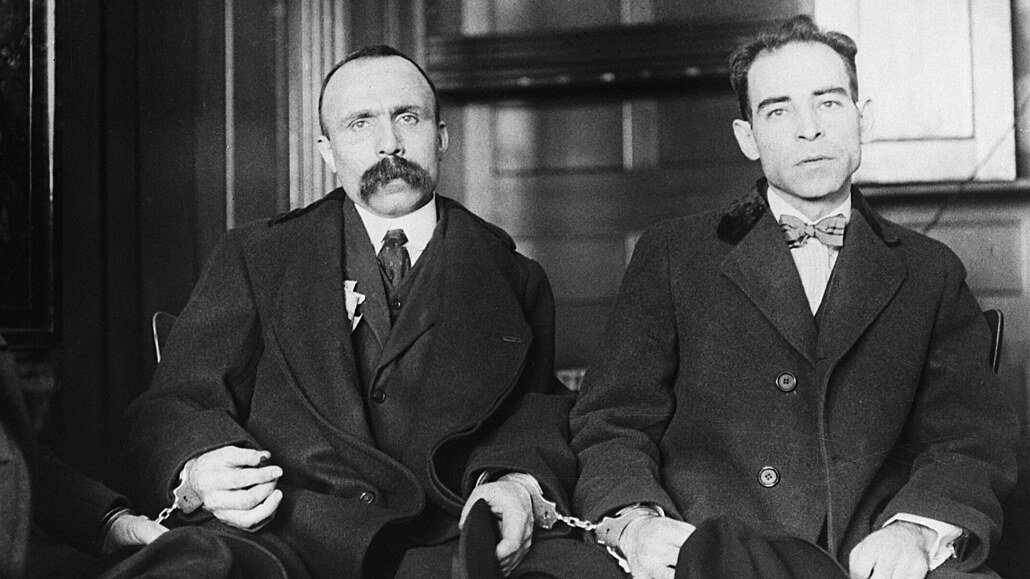
Anarchist trial defendants Bartolomeo Vanzetti (left) and Nicola Sacco (right)

Nicola Sacco (Italian: [niˈkɔːla ˈsakko]; April 22, 1891 – August 23, 1927) and Bartolomeo Vanzetti (Italian: [bartoloˈmɛːo vanˈtsetti, -ˈdzet-]; June 11, 1888 – August 23, 1927) were Italian immigrants and anarchists, controversially accused of murdering Alessandro Berardelli and Frederick Parmenter, a guard and a paymaster, during the April 15, 1920, armed robbery of the Slater and Morrill Shoe Company in Braintree, Massachusetts, United States. Seven years later, they were executed in the electric chair at Charlestown State Prison, on the same day as Celestino Medeiros, who had confessed to the crime. (Note: Technically, Medeiros was executed for a different murder, but his execution had been stayed in the event his testimony was needed in the Sacco–Vanzetti case.) Most historians consider their conviction unfair because it was affected by prejudice against immigrants and radicals.

After a few hours' deliberation on July 14, 1921, the jury convicted Sacco and Vanzetti of first-degree murder and they were sentenced to death by the trial judge. Anti-Italianism, anti-immigrant, and anti-anarchist bias were suspected by some as having influenced the verdict. A series of appeals followed, funded largely by the private Sacco and Vanzetti Defense Committee. The appeals were based on recanted testimony, conflicting ballistics evidence, a prejudicial pretrial statement by the jury foreman, and a confession by an alleged participant in the robbery. All appeals were denied by trial judge Webster Thayer and also later denied by the Massachusetts Supreme Judicial Court. By 1926, the case had drawn worldwide attention. As details of the trial and the men's suspected innocence became known, Sacco and Vanzetti became the center of one of the largest causes célèbres in modern history. In 1927, protests on their behalf were held in every major city in North America and Europe, as well as in Tokyo, Sydney, Melbourne, São Paulo, Rio de Janeiro, Buenos Aires, Dubai, Montevideo, Johannesburg, Mexico City and Auckland.

Celebrated writers, artists, and academics pleaded for their pardon or for a new trial. Harvard law professor and future Supreme Court justice Felix Frankfurter argued for their innocence in a widely read Atlantic Monthly article that was later published in book form. Even the Italian fascist dictator Benito Mussolini was convinced of their innocence and attempted to pressure American authorities to have them released. The two were scheduled to be executed in April 1927, accelerating the outcry. Responding to a massive influx of telegrams urging their pardon, Massachusetts governor Alvan T. Fuller appointed a three-man commission to investigate the case. After weeks of secret deliberation that included interviews with the judge, lawyers, and several witnesses, the commission upheld the verdict. Sacco and Vanzetti were executed in the electric chair just after midnight on August 23, 1927.

Investigations in the aftermath of the executions continued throughout the 1930s and 1940s. The publication of the men's letters, containing eloquent professions of innocence, intensified the public's belief in their wrongful execution. A ballistic test performed in 1961 suggested that the pistol found on Sacco was used to commit the murders, though later commentators have questioned its reliability and conclusiveness, given questions about the chain of custody and possible manipulation of evidence. On August 23, 1977—the 50th anniversary of the executions—Massachusetts Governor Michael Dukakis issued a proclamation that Sacco and Vanzetti had been unfairly tried and convicted and that "any disgrace should be forever removed from their names". The proclamation however, did not include a pardon.

== Background ==
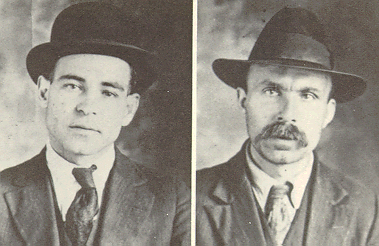
Sacco and Vanzetti

Sacco was a shoemaker and a night watchman, born April 22, 1891, in Torremaggiore, Province of Foggia, Apulia region (in Italian: Puglia), Italy, who migrated to the United States at the age of seventeen. Before immigrating, according to a letter he sent while imprisoned, Sacco worked on his father's vineyard, often sleeping out in the field at night to prevent animals from destroying the crops. Vanzetti was a fishmonger born June 11, 1888, in Villafalletto, Province of Cuneo, Piedmont region. Both left Italy for the US in 1908, although they did not meet until a 1917 strike.

The men were believed to be followers of Luigi Galleani, an Italian anarchist who advocated revolutionary violence, including bombing and assassination. Galleani published Cronaca Sovversiva (Subversive Chronicle), a periodical that advocated violent revolution, and a bomb-making manual called La Salute è in voi! (Salvation Is within You!). At the time, immigrant Italian anarchists—in particular the Galleanist group—ranked at the top of the United States government's list of dangerous enemies. Since 1914, the Galleanists had been identified as suspects in several violent bombings and assassination attempts, including an attempted mass poisoning. Publication of Cronaca Sovversiva was suppressed in July 1918, and the government deported Galleani and eight of his closest associates on June 24, 1919.

Other Galleanists remained active for three years, 60 of whom waged an intermittent campaign of violence against US politicians, judges, and other federal and local officials, especially those who had supported deportation of alien radicals. Among the dozen or more violent acts was the bombing of Attorney General A. Mitchell Palmer's home on June 2, 1919. In that incident, Carlo Valdinocci, a former editor of Cronaca Sovversiva, was killed when the bomb intended for Palmer exploded in the editor's hands. Radical pamphlets entitled "Plain Words" signed "The Anarchist Fighters" were found at the scene of this and several other midnight bombings that night.

Several Galleanist associates were suspected or interrogated about their roles in the bombing incidents. Two days before Sacco and Vanzetti were arrested, a Galleanist named Andrea Salsedo fell to his death from the US Justice Department's Bureau of Investigation (BOI) offices on the 14th floor of 15 Park Row in New York City. Salsedo had worked in the Canzani Printshop in Brooklyn, to where federal agents traced the "Plain Words" leaflet.

Roberto Elia, a fellow New York printer and admitted anarchist, was later deposed in the inquiry, and testified that Salsedo had committed suicide for fear of betraying the others. He portrayed himself as the 'strong' one who had resisted the police. According to anarchist writer Carlo Tresca, Elia changed his story later, stating that Federal agents had thrown Salsedo out the window.

=== Braintree murders ===
Vanzetti's .38 Harrington & Richardson top break revolver

Sacco's .32 Colt Model 1903 automatic pistol

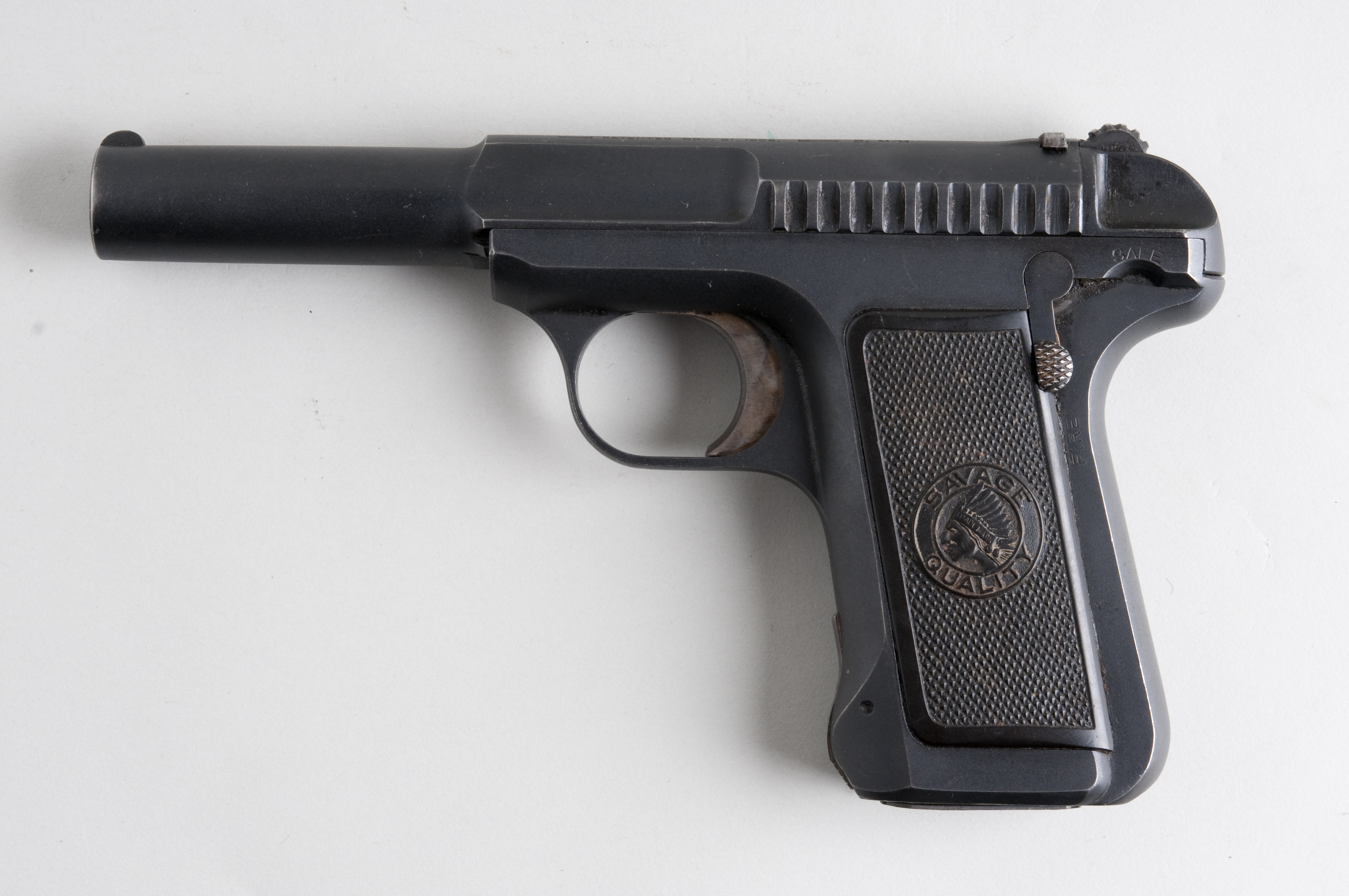
.32 Savage Model 1907 semi-automatic pistol

The Slater-Morrill Shoe Company factory was located on Pearl Street in Braintree, Massachusetts. On April 15, 1920, two men were robbed and killed while transporting the company's payroll in two large steel boxes to the main factory. One of them, Alessandro Berardelli—a security guard—was shot four times as he reached for his hip-holstered .38-caliber, Harrington & Richardson revolver; his gun was not recovered from the scene. The other man, Frederick Parmenter—a paymaster who was unarmed—was shot twice: once in the chest and a second time, fatally, in the back as he attempted to flee. The robbers seized the payroll boxes and escaped in a stolen dark blue Buick that was carrying several other men.

As the car was being driven away by Michael Codispoti, the robbers fired wildly at company workers nearby. A coroner's report and subsequent ballistic investigation revealed that six bullets removed from the murdered men's bodies were of .32 automatic (ACP) caliber. Five of these .32-caliber bullets were all fired from a single semi-automatic pistol, a .32-caliber Savage Model 1907, which used a particularly narrow-grooved barrel rifling with a right-hand twist. Two of the bullets were recovered from Berardelli's body. Four .32 automatic brass shell casings were found at the murder scene, manufactured by one of three firms: Peters, Winchester, or Remington. The Winchester cartridge case was of a relatively obsolete cartridge loading, which had been discontinued from production some years earlier. Two days after the robbery, police located the robbers' Buick; several 12-gauge shotgun shells were found on the ground nearby.

=== Arrests and indictment ===
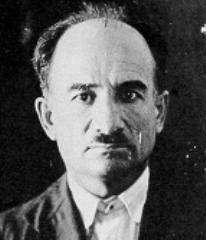
Mario Buda

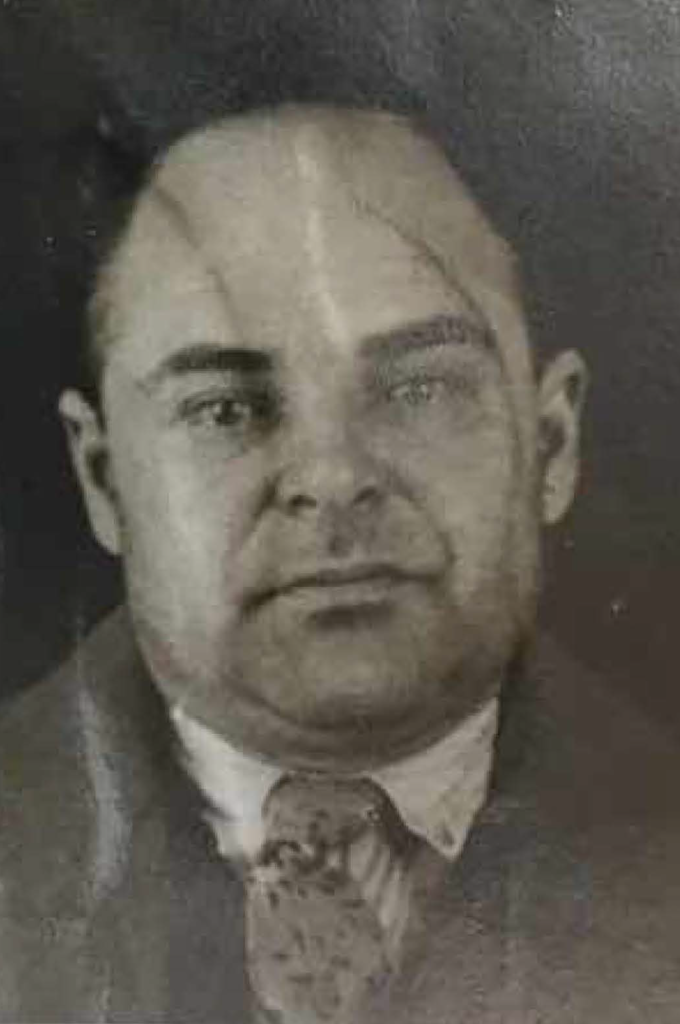
Ferruccio Coacci

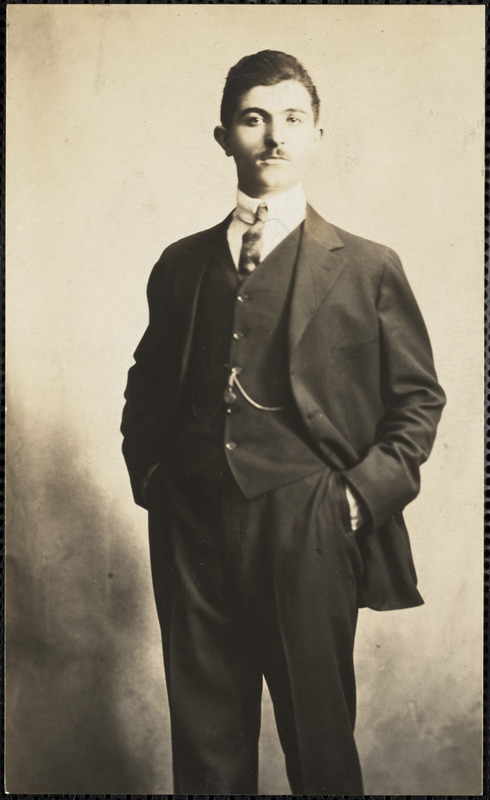
Ricardo Orciani

An earlier attempted (unsuccessful) robbery of another shoe factory payroll had occurred on December 24, 1919, in Bridgewater, Massachusetts, by four persons identified as Italian who used a car that was seen escaping to Cochesett in West Bridgewater. A delivery truck for the L.Q. White Shoe Factory was taking a $33,113.31 payroll with a driver, paymaster and a police constable. The assailants in a car tried to hijack the truck with one robber using a pistol and the other a double-barrelled shotgun. Police speculated that Italian anarchists perpetrated the robberies to finance their activities. Bridgewater police chief Michael E. Stewart suspected that known Italian anarchist Ferruccio Coacci was involved. Stewart discovered that Mario Buda (aka 'Mike' Boda) lived with Coacci.

When Chief Stewart later arrived at the Coacci home, only Buda was living there, and, when questioned, he said that Coacci owned a .32 Savage automatic pistol, which he kept in the kitchen. A search of the kitchen did not locate the gun, but Stewart found (in a kitchen drawer) a manufacturer's technical diagram for a Model 1907 of the exact type of .32 caliber pistol used to shoot Parmenter and Berardelli. Stewart asked Buda if he owned a gun, and the man produced a .32-caliber Spanish-made automatic pistol. Buda told police that he owned a 1914 Overland automobile, which was being repaired. The car was delivered for repairs four days after the Braintree crimes, but it was old and apparently had not been run for five months. Tire tracks were seen near the abandoned Buick getaway car, and Chief Stewart surmised that two cars had been used in the getaway, and that Buda's car might have been the second car.

When Stewart discovered that Coacci had worked for both shoe factories that had been robbed, he returned with the Bridgewater police. Mario Buda was not home, but, on May 5, 1920, he arrived at the garage with three other men, later identified as Sacco, Vanzetti, and Riccardo Orciani. The four men knew each other well; Buda would later refer to Sacco and Vanzetti as "the best friends I had in America". None of these arrests led the police to the relevant robbed cash loot.

Sacco and Vanzetti boarded a streetcar but were tracked down and soon arrested. When searched by police, both denied owning any guns, but were found to be holding loaded pistols. Sacco was found to have an Italian passport, anarchist literature, a loaded .32 Colt Model 1903 automatic pistol, and twenty-three .32 automatic cartridges in his possession; several of those bullet cases were of the same obsolescent type as the empty Winchester .32 casing found at the crime scene, and others were manufactured by the firms of Peters and Remington, much like other casings found at the scene. Vanzetti had four 12-gauge shotgun shells and a five-shot nickel-plated .38-caliber Harrington & Richardson revolver. All looked exactly alike, similar to the 38 carried by Berardelli, the slain Braintree guard, whose weapon was not found at the scene of the crime. When they were questioned, the pair denied any connection to anarchists.

Orciani was arrested May 6, but gave the alibi that he had been at work on the day of both crimes. Sacco had been at work on the day of the Bridgewater crimes but said that he had the day off on April 15—the day of the Braintree crimes—and was charged with those murders. The self-employed Vanzetti had no such alibis and was charged for the attempted robbery and attempted murder in Bridgewater and the robbery and murder in the Braintree crimes. Sacco and Vanzetti were charged with the crime of murder on May 5, 1920, and indicted four months later on September 14.

Following Sacco and Vanzetti's indictment for murder for the Braintree robbery, Galleanists and anarchists in the United States and abroad began a campaign of violent retaliation. Two days later, on September 16, 1920, Mario Buda allegedly orchestrated the Wall Street bombing, where a time-delay dynamite bomb packed with heavy iron sash-weights in a horse-drawn cart exploded, killing 40 people and wounding 134. In 1921, a booby trap bomb mailed to the American ambassador in Paris exploded, wounding his valet. For the next six years, bombs exploded at other American embassies all over the world.

== Trials ==
=== Bridgewater crimes trial ===
Rather than accept court-appointed counsel, Vanzetti chose to be represented by John P. Vahey, a former foundry superintendent and future state court judge who had been practicing law since 1905, most notably with his brother James H. Vahey and his law partner Charles Hiller Innes. James Graham, who was recommended by supporters, also served as defense counsel. Frederick G. Katzmann, the Norfolk and Plymouth County District Attorney, prosecuted the case. The presiding judge was Webster Thayer, who was already assigned to the court before this case was scheduled. A few weeks earlier he had given a speech to new American citizens decrying Bolshevism and anarchism's threat to American institutions. He supported the suppression of functionally violent radical speech, and incitement to commit violent acts. He was known to dislike foreigners but was considered to be a fair judge.

The trial began on June 22, 1920. The prosecution presented several witnesses who put Vanzetti at the scene of the crime. Their descriptions varied, especially with respect to the shape and length of Vanzetti's mustache. Physical evidence included a shotgun shell retrieved at the scene of the crime and several shells found on Vanzetti when he was arrested.

The defense produced 16 witnesses, all Italians from Plymouth, who testified that at the time of the attempted robbery they had bought eels from Vanzetti for Christmas, in accordance with their traditions. Such details reinforced the difference between the Italians and the jurors. Some testified in imperfect English, others through an interpreter, whose inability to speak the same dialect of Italian as the witnesses hampered his effectiveness. On cross examination, the prosecution found it easy to make the witnesses appear confused about dates. A boy who testified admitted to rehearsing his testimony. "You learned it just like a piece at school?", the prosecutor asked. "Sure", he replied. The defense tried to rebut the eyewitnesses with testimony that Vanzetti always wore his mustache in a distinctive long style, but the prosecution rebutted this.

The defense case went badly and Vanzetti did not testify in his own defense. During the trial, he said that his lawyers had opposed putting him on the stand. That same year, defense attorney Vahey told the governor that Vanzetti had refused his advice to testify. Decades later, a lawyer who assisted Vahey in the defense said that the defense attorneys left the choice to Vanzetti, but warned him that it would be difficult to prevent the prosecution from using cross examination to challenge the credibility of his character based on his political beliefs. He said that Vanzetti chose not to testify after consulting with Sacco. Herbert B. Ehrmann, who later joined the defense team, wrote many years later that the dangers of putting Vanzetti on the stand were very real. Another legal analysis of the case faulted the defense for not offering more to the jury by letting Vanzetti testify, concluding that by his remaining silent it "left the jury to decide between the eyewitnesses and the alibi witness without his aid. In these circumstances a verdict of not guilty would have been very unusual". That analysis claimed that "no one could say that the case was closely tried or vigorously fought for the defendant".

Vanzetti complained during his sentencing on April 9, 1927, for the Braintree crimes, that Vahey "sold me for thirty golden money like Judas sold Jesus Christ." He accused Vahey of having conspired with the prosecutor "to agitate still more the passion of the juror, the prejudice of the juror" towards "people of our principles, against the foreigner, against slackers."

On July 1, 1920, the jury deliberated for five hours and returned guilty verdicts on both counts, assault with intent to rob and assault with intent to murder. Before sentencing, Judge Thayer learned that during deliberations, the jury had tampered with the shotgun shells found on Vanzetti at the time of his arrest to determine if the shot they contained was of sufficient size to kill a man. Since that prejudiced the jury's verdict on the attempted murder charge, Thayer declared that part a mistrial. On August 16, 1920, he sentenced Vanzetti, on the charge of assault with intent to rob, to a term of 12 to 15 years in prison, the maximum sentence allowed.

Sacco and Vanzetti both denounced Thayer. Vanzetti wrote, "I will try to see Thayer death [sic] before his pronunciation of our sentence" and asked fellow anarchists for "revenge, revenge in our names and the names of our living and dead."

In 1927, advocates for Sacco and Vanzetti charged that this case was brought first because a conviction for the Bridgewater crimes would help convict him for the Braintree crimes, where evidence against him was weak. The prosecution countered that the timing was driven by the schedules of different courts that handled the cases. The defense raised only minor objections in an appeal that was not accepted. A few years later, Vahey joined Katzmann's law firm.

=== Braintree crimes trial ===
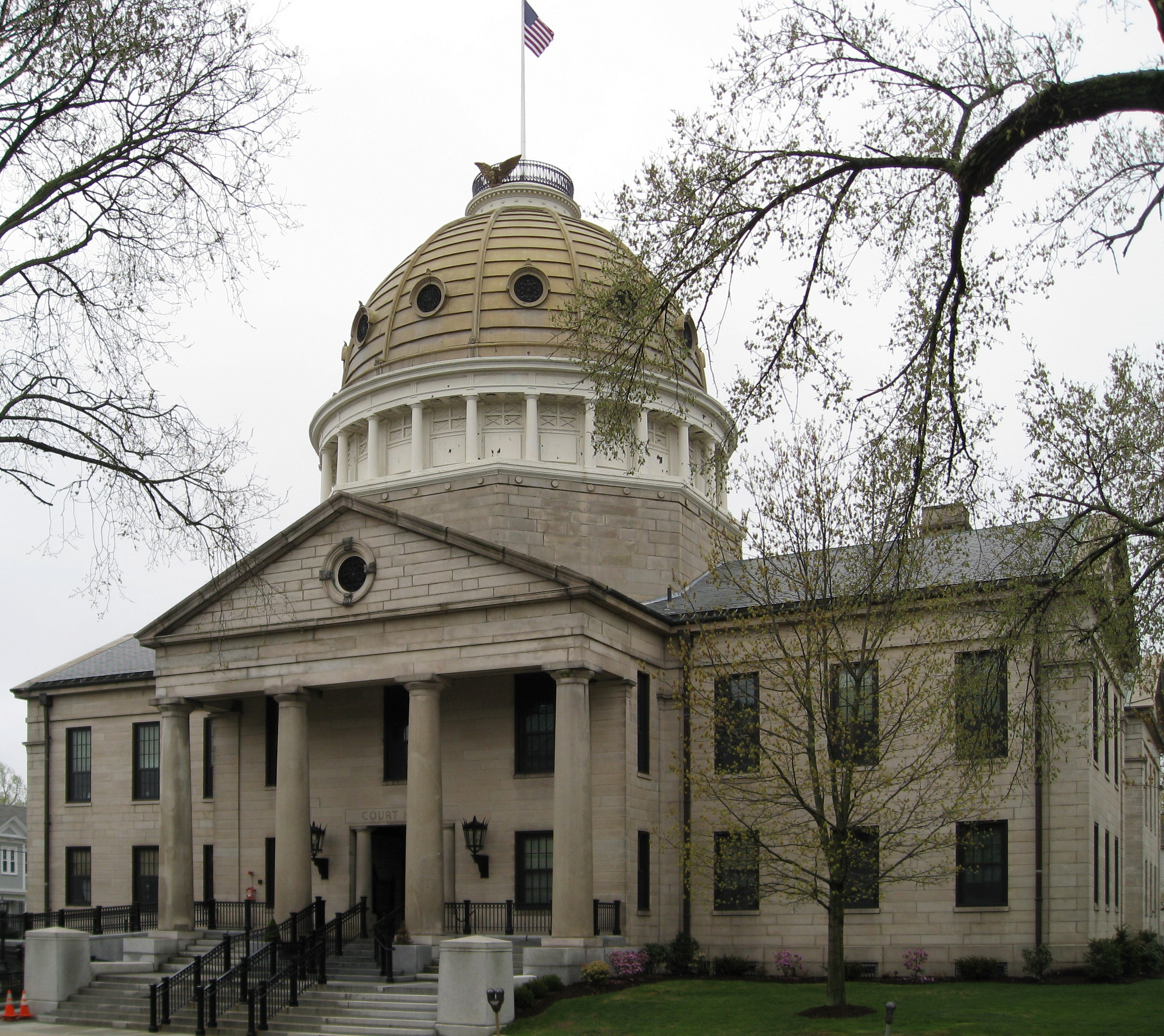
Norfolk County Courthouse, Dedham, Massachusetts, site of the second trial

Sacco and Vanzetti went on trial for their lives on May 31, 1921, at Dedham, Norfolk County, Massachusetts, for the Braintree robbery and murders. Webster Thayer again presided; he had asked to be assigned to the trial. Katzmann again prosecuted for the Commonwealth. Vanzetti was represented by brothers Jeremiah and Thomas McAnraney. Sacco was represented by Fred H. Moore and William J. Callahan. The choice of Moore, a former attorney for the Industrial Workers of the World, proved a key mistake for the defense. A notorious radical from California, Moore quickly enraged Judge Thayer with his courtroom demeanor, often doffing his jacket and once, his shoes. Reporters covering the case were amazed to hear Judge Thayer, during a lunch recess, proclaim, "I'll show them that no long-haired anarchist from California can run this court!" and later, "You wait till I give my charge to the jury. I'll show them."

Authorities anticipated a possible bomb attack and had the Dedham courtroom outfitted with heavy, sliding steel doors and cast-iron shutters that were painted to appear wooden. Each day during the trial, the courthouse was placed under heavy police security, and Sacco and Vanzetti were escorted to and from the courtroom by armed guards.

The Commonwealth relied on evidence that Sacco was absent from his work in a shoe factory on the day of the murders; that the defendants were in the neighborhood of the Braintree robbery-murder scene on the morning when it occurred, being identified as having been there seen separately and also together; that the Buick getaway car was also in the neighborhood and that Vanzetti was near and in it; that Sacco was seen near the scene of the murders before they occurred and also was seen to shoot Berardelli after Berardelli fell and that that shot caused his death; that used shell casings were left at the scene of the murders, some of which could have been found to have been discharged from a .32 pistol afterwards found on Sacco; that a cap was found at the scene of the murders, which witnesses identified as resembling one formerly worn by Sacco; and that both men were members of anarchist cells that espoused violence, including assassination. Among the more important witnesses called by the prosecution was salesman Carlos E. Goodridge, who stated that as the getaway car raced within twenty-five feet of him, one of the car's occupants, whom he identified as being Sacco, pointed a gun in his direction.

Much of the trial focused on material evidence, notably bullets, guns, and the cap. Prosecution witnesses testified that Bullet III, the .32-caliber bullet that had fatally wounded Berardelli, was from a discontinued Winchester .32 Auto cartridge loading so obsolete that the only bullets similar to it that anyone could locate to make comparisons were actually those found in the cartridges in Sacco's pockets.

In court, District Attorney Katzmann called two forensic gun expert witnesses, Capt. Charles Van Amburgh of Springfield Armory and Capt. William Proctor of the Massachusetts State Police, who testified that they believed that of the four bullets recovered from Berardelli's body, Bullet III—the fatal bullet—exhibited rifling marks consistent with those found on bullets fired from Sacco's .32 Colt Automatic pistol. In rebuttal, two defense forensic gun experts testified that Bullet III did not match any of the test bullets from Sacco's Colt.

After the trial, Capt. Proctor signed an affidavit stating that he could not positively identify Sacco's .32 Colt as the only pistol that could have fired Bullet III. This meant that Bullet III could have been fired from any of the 300,000 .32 Colt Automatic pistols then in circulation. All witnesses to the shooting testified that they saw one gunman shoot Berardelli four times, yet the defense never questioned how only one bullets of the four found in the murdered guard's body was identified as fired from Sacco's Colt. At the grand jury hearing, Doctor Charles McGrath testified that all four bullets removed from Berardelli's body "looked exactly alike". Hence it was concluded that both bullet III and Shell W, must have been planted several months before the trial.

Vanzetti was being tried under Massachusetts' felony-murder rule, and the prosecution sought to implicate him in the Braintree robbery by the testimony of several witnesses: one testified that he was in the getaway car, and others who stated they saw Vanzetti in the vicinity of the Braintree factory around the time of the robbery. No direct evidence tied Vanzetti's .38 nickel-plated Harrington & Richardson five-shot revolver to the crime scene, except for the fact that it was identical in type and appearance to one owned by the slain guard Berardelli, which was missing from the crime scene. All six bullets recovered from the victims were 32 caliber, fired from at least two different automatic pistols. The prosecution claimed Vanzetti's 38 revolver of Berardelli, taken from his body during the robbery. No one testified of having seen anyone taking that gun, yet Berardelli had an empty holster and no gun on when found. Yet, witnesses to the payroll shooting had described Berardelli as reaching for his gun on his hip when he was cut down by pistol fire from the robbers.

District Attorney Katzmann pointed out that Vanzetti had lied at the time of his arrest, when making statements about the .38 revolver found in his possession. He claimed that the revolver was his own, and that he carried it for self-protection, yet he incorrectly described it to police as a six-shot revolver instead of a five-shot. Vanzetti also told police that he had purchased only one box of cartridges for the gun, all of the same make, yet his revolver was loaded with five .38 cartridges of varying brands. At the time of his arrest, Vanzetti also claimed that he had bought the gun at a store (but could not remember which one), and that it cost $18 or $19 (three times its actual market value). He lied about where he had obtained the .38 cartridges found in the revolver.

The prosecution traced the history of Berardelli's .38 Harrington & Richardson (H&R) revolver. Berardelli's wife testified that she and her husband dropped off the gun for repair at the Iver Johnson Co. of Boston a few weeks before the murder. According to the foreman of the shop, Berardelli's revolver was given a repair tag with the number of 94765, which was recorded in its repair logbook with the statement "H. & R. revolver, .38-calibre, new hammer, repairing, half an hour". However, the shop books did not record the gun's serial number, and the caliber was apparently incorrectly labeled as .32 instead of .38-caliber. The shop foreman testified that a new spring and hammer were put into Berardelli's Harrington & Richardson revolver. The gun was claimed and the half-hour repair paid for, though the date and identity of the claimant were not recorded. After examining Vanzetti's .38 revolver, the foreman testified that Vanzetti's gun had a new replacement hammer in keeping with the repair performed on Berardelli's revolver. The foreman explained that the shop was always kept busy repairing 20 to 30 revolvers per day, which made it very hard to remember individual guns or keep reliable records of when they were picked up by their owners. But, he said that unclaimed guns were sold by Iver Johnson at the end of each year, and the shop had no record of an unclaimed gun sale of Berardelli's revolver. To reinforce the conclusion that Berardelli had reclaimed his revolver from the repair shop, the prosecution called a witness who testified that he had seen Berardelli in possession of a .38 nickel-plated revolver the Saturday night before the Braintree robbery.

After hearing testimony from the repair shop employee that "the repair shop had no record of Berardelli picking up the gun, the gun was not in the shop nor had it been sold", the defense put Vanzetti on the stand where he testified that "he had actually bought the gun several months earlier from fellow anarchist Luigi Falzini for five dollars"—in contradiction to what he had told police upon his arrest. This was corroborated by Luigi Falzini (Falsini), a friend of Vanzetti's and a fellow Galleanist, who stated that, after buying the .38 revolver from one Riccardo Orciani, he sold it to Vanzetti. The defense also called two expert witnesses, a Mr. Burns and a Mr. Fitzgerald, who each testified that no new spring and hammer had ever been installed in the revolver found in Vanzetti's possession.

The District Attorney's final evidence was a flop-eared cap claimed to have been Sacco's was the cap he tried on right in court, according two newspaper sketch artists who ran its cartoons the next day, it was too small, sitting high on his head. But Katzmann insisted the cap fitted Sacco and, noting a hole in the back where Sacco had hung the cap on a nail each day, continued to refer to it as his, and in denying later appeals, Judge Thayer often cited the cap as material evidence. During the 1927 Lowell Commission investigation, however, Braintree's Police Chief admitted that he had torn the cap open upon finding it at the crime scene a full day after the murders. Doubting the cap was Sacco's, the chief told the commission it could not have lain in the street "for thirty hours with the State Police, the local police, and two or three thousand people there."

Controversy clouded the prosecution witnesses who identified Sacco as having been at the scene of the crime. One, a bookkeeper named Mary Splaine, precisely described Sacco as the man she saw firing from the getaway car. From Felix Frankfurter's account from The Atlantic Monthly article:

Viewing the scene from a distance of sixty to eighty feet, she saw a man previously unknown to her in a car traveling at the rate of from fifteen to eighteen miles per hour, and she saw him only for a distance of about thirty feet—that is to say, for from one and a half to three seconds.

Further, if one or both men were guilty of such savage robbery murder, how did they get so many casual witnesses to lie for them? And what happened to the large stash of stolen money? Yet cross examination revealed that Splaine was unable to identify Sacco at the inquest, but had recall of great details of Sacco's appearance over a year later. While a few others singled out Sacco or Vanzetti as the men they had seen at the scene of the crime, far more witnesses, both prosecution and defense, could not identify them.

The defendants' radical politics may have played a role in the verdict. Judge Thayer, though a sworn enemy of anarchists, warned the defense against bringing anarchism into the trial. Yet defense attorney Fred Moore felt he had to call both Sacco and Vanzetti as witnesses to let them explain why they were fully armed when arrested. Both men testified that they had been rounding up radical literature when apprehended, and that they had feared another government deportation raid. Yet both hurt their case with rambling discourses on radical politics that the prosecution mocked. The prosecution further stressed its case, claiming that both men fled the draft by traveling to Mexico in 1917.

==== Jury ====
The 12 jurors were sequestered at the courthouse for the entirety of the six-week trial. They slept on cots in the courthouse's grand jury room and bathed in the basement of the jail. To celebrate the 4th of July, they were brought to Scituate, Massachusetts and given a lobster dinner.

To get a full jury, courthouse officials had to go to extraordinary lengths. Over 600 men were interviewed, with the most common reason for dismissal being their opposition to the death penalty. One man, a sugar dealer, tried to pretend that he was deaf in an attempt to get out of serving on the jury. When he was discovered, by answering a question posed by the judge, Sacco and Vanzetti were sent into fits of laughter.

After 500 potential jurors were interviewed, but only seven selected, deputies from the Norfolk County Sheriff's office went out to workplaces, club meetings, concerts, and elsewhere to bring in additional potential jurors. One man, ultimately selected, was brought from his wedding dinner. The Quincy man had to postpone his honeymoon until after the trial.

The jury ultimately reached a guilty verdict. The verdicts and the likelihood of death sentences immediately roused international opinion. Demonstrations were held in 60 Italian cities and a flood of mail was sent to the American embassy in Paris. Demonstrations followed in a number of Latin American cities. Anatole France, veteran of the campaign for Alfred Dreyfus and recipient of the 1921 Nobel Prize for Literature, wrote an "Appeal to the American People": "The death of Sacco and Vanzetti will make martyrs of them and cover you with shame. You are a great people. You ought to be a just people."

=== Defense committee ===
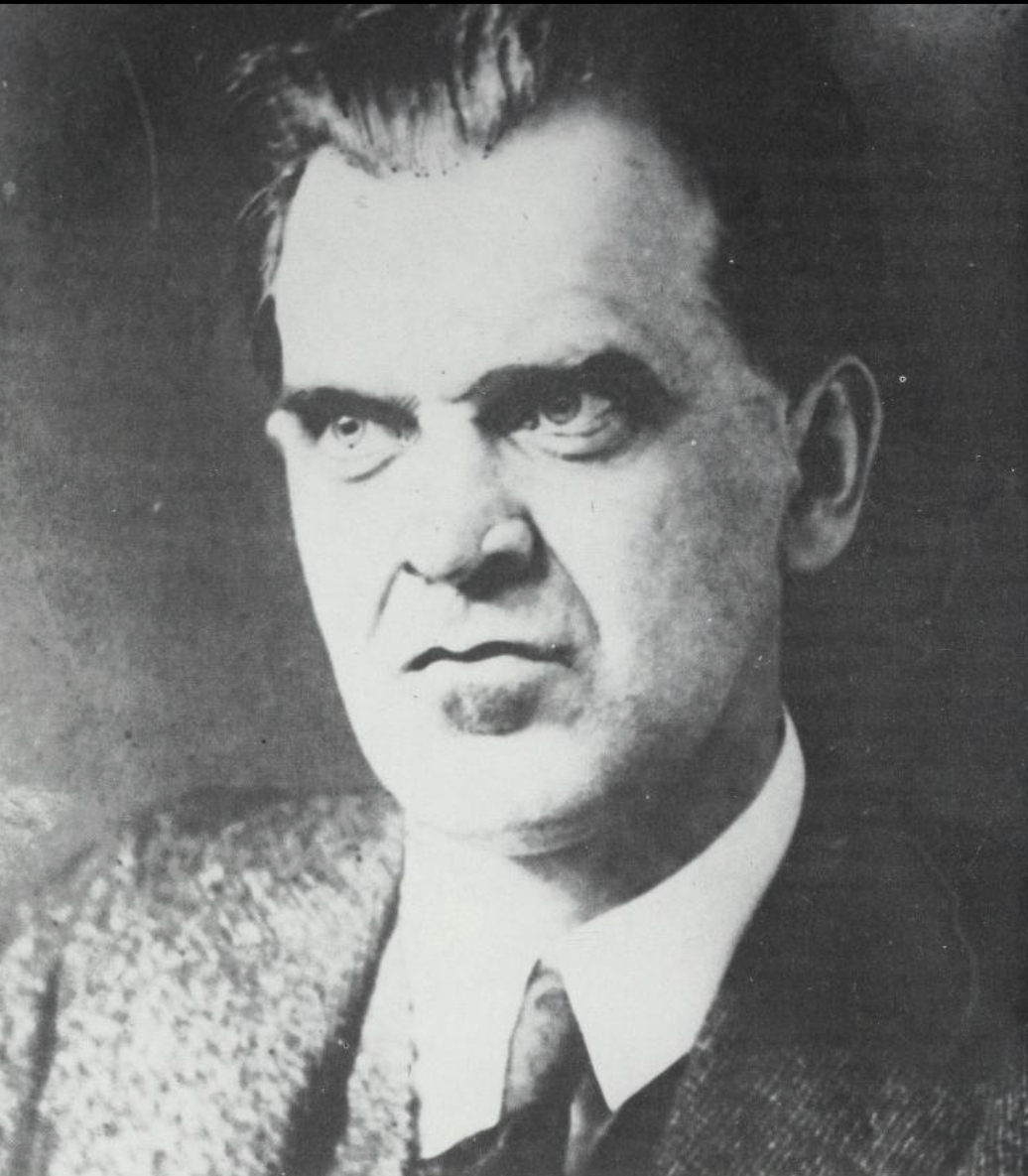
Defense attorney Fred Moore.

In 1921, most of the nation had not yet heard of Sacco and Vanzetti. Brief mention of the conviction appeared on page three of the New York Times. Defense attorney Moore radicalized and politicized the process by discussing Sacco and Vanzetti's anarchist beliefs, attempting to suggest that they were prosecuted primarily for their political beliefs and the trial was part of a government plan to stop the anarchist movement in the United States. His efforts helped stir up support but were so costly that he was eventually dismissed from the defense team.

The Sacco-Vanzetti Defense Committee was formed on May 9, 1920, immediately following the arrests, by a group of fellow anarchists, headed by Vanzetti's 23-year-old friend Aldino Felicani. Over the next seven years, it raised $300,000. Defense attorney Fred Moore drew on its funds for his investigations. Differences arose when Moore tried to determine who had committed the Braintree crimes over objections from anarchists that he was doing the government's work. After the Committee hired William G. Thompson to manage the legal defense, he objected to its propaganda efforts.

A Defense Committee publicist wrote an article about the first trial that was published in The New Republic. In the winter of 1920–1921, the Defense Committee sent stories to labor union publications every week. It produced pamphlets with titles like Fangs at Labor's Throat, sometimes printing thousands of copies. It sent speakers to Italian communities in factory towns and mining camps. The Committee eventually added staff from outside the anarchist movement, notably Mary Donovan, who had experience as a labor leader and Sinn Féin organizer. In 1927, she and Felicani together recruited Gardner Jackson, a Boston Globe reporter from a wealthy family, to manage publicity and serve as a mediator between Committee's anarchists and the growing number of supporters with more liberal political views who included socialites, lawyers and intellectuals. Jackson bridged the gap between the radicals and the social elite so well that Sacco thanked him a few weeks before his execution:

We are one heart, but unfortunately we represent two different class. ... But, whenever the heart of one of the upper class join with the exploited workers for the struggle of the right in the human feeling is the feel of an spontaneous attraction and brotherly love to one another.

The noted American author John Dos Passos joined the committee and wrote its 127-page official review of the case: Facing the Chair: Story of Americanization of Two Foreignborn Workmen. Dos Passos concluded it "barely possible" that Sacco might have committed murder as part of a class war, but that the soft-hearted Vanzetti was clearly innocent. "Nobody in his right mind who was planning such a crime would take a man like that along", Dos Passos wrote of Vanzetti. After the executions, the Committee continued its work, helping to gather material that eventually appeared as The Letters of Sacco and Vanzetti.

=== Motions for a new trial ===
Multiple separate motions for a new trial were denied by Judge Thayer. One motion, the so-called Hamilton-Proctor motion, involved the forensic ballistic evidence presented by the expert witnesses for the prosecution and defense. The prosecution's firearms expert, Charles Van Amburgh, had re-examined the evidence in preparation for the motion. By 1923, bullet-comparison technology had improved somewhat, and Van Amburgh submitted photos of the bullets fired from Sacco's .32 Colt in support of the argument that they matched the bullet that killed Berardelli. In response, the controversial self-proclaimed "firearms expert" for the defense, Albert H. Hamilton, conducted an in-court demonstration involving two brand new Colt .32-caliber automatic pistols belonging to Hamilton, along with Sacco's .32 Colt of the same make and caliber. In front of Judge Thayer and the lawyers for both sides, Hamilton disassembled all three pistols and placed the major component parts—barrel, barrel bushing, recoil spring, frame, slide, and magazine—into three piles on the table before him. He explained the functions of each part and began to demonstrate how each was interchangeable, in the process intermingling the parts of all three pistols. Judge Thayer stopped Hamilton and demanded that he reassemble Sacco's pistol with its proper parts.

Other motions focused on the jury foreman and a prosecution ballistics expert. In 1923, the defense filed an affidavit from a friend of the jury foreman, who swore that prior to the trial, the jury foreman had allegedly said of Sacco and Vanzetti, "Damn them, they ought to hang them anyway!" That same year, the defense read to the court an affidavit by Captain William Proctor (who had died shortly after conclusion of the trial) in which Proctor stated that he could not say that Bullet III was fired by Sacco's .32 Colt pistol. At the conclusion of the appeal hearings, Thayer denied all motions for a new trial on October 1, 1924.

Several months later, in February 1924, Judge Thayer asked one of the firearms experts for the prosecution, Capt. Charles Van Amburgh, to reinspect Sacco's Colt and determine its condition. With District Attorney Katzmann present, Van Amburgh took the gun from the clerk and started to take it apart. Van Amburgh quickly noticed that the barrel to Sacco's gun was brand new, being still covered in the manufacturer's protective rust preventative. Judge Thayer began private hearings to determine who had tampered with the evidence by switching the barrel on Sacco's gun. During three weeks of hearings, Albert Hamilton and Captain Van Amburgh squared off, challenging each other's authority. Testimony suggested that Sacco's gun had been treated with little care, and frequently disassembled for inspection. New defense attorney William Thompson insisted that no one on his side could have switched the barrels "unless they wanted to run their necks into a noose." Albert Hamilton swore he had only taken the gun apart while being watched by Judge Thayer. Judge Thayer made no finding as to who had switched the .32 Colt barrels, but ordered the rusty barrel returned to Sacco's Colt. After the hearing concluded, unannounced to Judge Thayer, Captain Van Amburgh took both Sacco's and Vanzetti's guns, along with the bullets and shells involved in the crime to his home where he kept them until a Boston Globe exposé revealed the misappropriation in 1960. Meanwhile, Van Amburgh bolstered his own credentials by writing an article on the case for True Detective Mysteries. The 1935 article charged that prior to the discovery of the gun barrel switch, Albert Hamilton had tried to walk out of the courtroom with Sacco's gun but was stopped by Judge Thayer. Although several historians of the case, including Francis Russell, have reported this story as factual, nowhere in transcripts of the private hearing on the gun barrel switch was this incident ever mentioned. The same year the True Detective article was published, a study of ballistics in the case concluded, "what might have been almost indubitable evidence was in fact rendered more than useless by the bungling of the experts."

=== Appeal to the Supreme Judicial Court ===
The defense appealed Thayer's denial of their motions to the Supreme Judicial Court (SJC), the highest level of the state's judicial system. Both sides presented arguments to its five judges on January 11–13, 1926. The SJC returned a unanimous ruling on May 12, 1926, upholding Judge Thayer's decisions. The Court did not have the authority to review the trial record as a whole or to judge the fairness of the case. Instead, the judges considered only whether Thayer had abused his discretion in the course of the trial. Thayer later claimed that the SJC had "approved" the verdicts, which advocates for the defendants protested as a misinterpretation of the Court's ruling, which only found "no error" in his individual rulings.

In November 1925, Celestino Medeiros, an ex-convict awaiting trial for murder, confessed to committing the Braintree crimes. He absolved Sacco and Vanzetti of participation in them. In May, once the SJC had denied their appeal and Medeiros was convicted, the defense investigated the details of Medeiros' story. Police interviews led them to the Morelli gang based in Providence, Rhode Island. They developed an alternative theory of the crime based on the gang's history of shoe-factory robberies, connections to a car like that used in Braintree, and other details. Gang leader Joe Morelli bore a striking resemblance to Sacco.

The defense filed a motion for a new trial based on the Medeiros confession on May 26, 1926. In support of their motion they included 64 affidavits. The prosecution countered with 26 affidavits. When Thayer heard arguments from September 13 to 17, 1926, the defense, along with their Medeiros-Morelli theory of the crime, charged that the U.S. Justice Department was aiding the prosecution by withholding information obtained in its own investigation of the case. Attorney William Thompson made an explicitly political attack: "A government which has come to value its own secrets more than it does the lives of its citizens has become a tyranny, whether you call it a republic, a monarchy, or anything else!" Judge Thayer denied this motion for a new trial on October 23, 1926. After arguing against the credibility of Medeiros, he addressed the defense claims, saying it was suffering from "new type of disease: a belief in something that truly and in fact has no such existence."

Three days later, the Boston Herald responded to Thayer's decision by reversing its longstanding position and calling for a new trial. Its editorial, "We Submit", earned its author a Pulitzer Prize. No other newspapers followed suit.

=== Second appeal to the Supreme Judicial Court ===
The defense promptly appealed again to the Supreme Judicial Court and presented their arguments on January 27 and 28, 1927. While the appeal was under consideration, Harvard law professor and future Supreme Court Justice Felix Frankfurter published an article in the Atlantic Monthly arguing for a retrial. He noted that the SJC had already taken a very narrow view of its authority when considering the first appeal and called upon the court to review the entire record of the case. He called their attention to Thayer's lengthy statement that accompanied his denial of the Medeiros appeal, describing it as "a farrago of misquotations, misrepresentations, suppressions, and mutilations" that were "honeycombed with demonstrable errors."

At the same time, Major Calvin Goddard was a ballistics expert who had helped pioneer the use of the comparison microscope in forensic ballistic research. He offered to conduct an independent examination of the gun and bullet forensic evidence by using techniques that he had developed for use with the comparison microscope. Goddard first offered to conduct a new forensic examination for the defense, which rejected it, and then to the prosecution, which accepted his offer. Using the comparison microscope, Goddard compared Bullet III and a .32 Auto shell casing found at the Braintree shooting with that of several .32 Auto test cartridges fired from Sacco's .32 Colt automatic pistol. Goddard concluded that not only did Bullet III match the rifling marks found on the barrel of Sacco's .32 Colt pistol, but that scratches made by the firing pin of Sacco's .32 Colt on the primers of spent shell casings test-fired from Sacco's Colt matched those found on the primer of a spent shell casing recovered at the Braintree murder scene. More sophisticated comparative examinations in 1935, 1961, and 1983 each reconfirmed the opinion that the bullet the prosecution said killed Berardelli and one of the cartridge cases introduced into evidence were fired in Sacco's .32 Colt automatic. However, in his book on new evidence in the Sacco and Vanzetti case, historian David E. Kaiser wrote that Bullet III and its shell casing, as presented, had been substituted by the prosecution and were not genuinely from the scene.

The Supreme Judicial Court denied the Medeiros appeal on April 5, 1927. Summarizing the decision, The New York Times said that the SJC had determined that "the judge had a right to rule as he did" but that the SJC "did not deny the validity of the new evidence". The SJC also said: "It is not imperative that a new trial be granted even though evidence is newly discovered and, if presented to a jury, would justify a different verdict."

=== Sentencing ===
On April 9, 1927, Judge Thayer heard final statements from Sacco and Vanzetti. In a lengthy speech Vanzetti said:

I would not wish to a dog or to a snake, to the most low and misfortunate creature of the earth, I would not wish to any of them what I have had to suffer for things that I am not guilty of. But my conviction is that I have suffered for things that I am guilty of. I am suffering because I am a radical and indeed I am a radical; I have suffered because I am an Italian and indeed I am an Italian ... if you could execute me two times, and if I could be reborn two other times, I would live again to do what I have done already.

Thayer declared that the responsibility for the conviction rested solely with the jury's determination of guilt. "The Court has absolutely nothing to do with that question." He sentenced each of them to "suffer the punishment of death by the passage of a current of electricity through your body" during the week beginning July 10. He twice postponed the execution date while the governor considered requests for clemency.

On May 10, a package bomb addressed to Governor Fuller was intercepted in the Boston post office.

=== Clemency appeal and the Governor's Advisory Committee ===
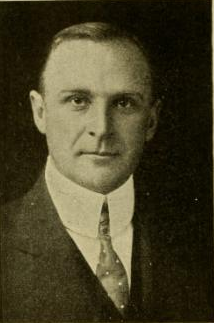
Massachusetts Governor Alvan T. Fuller

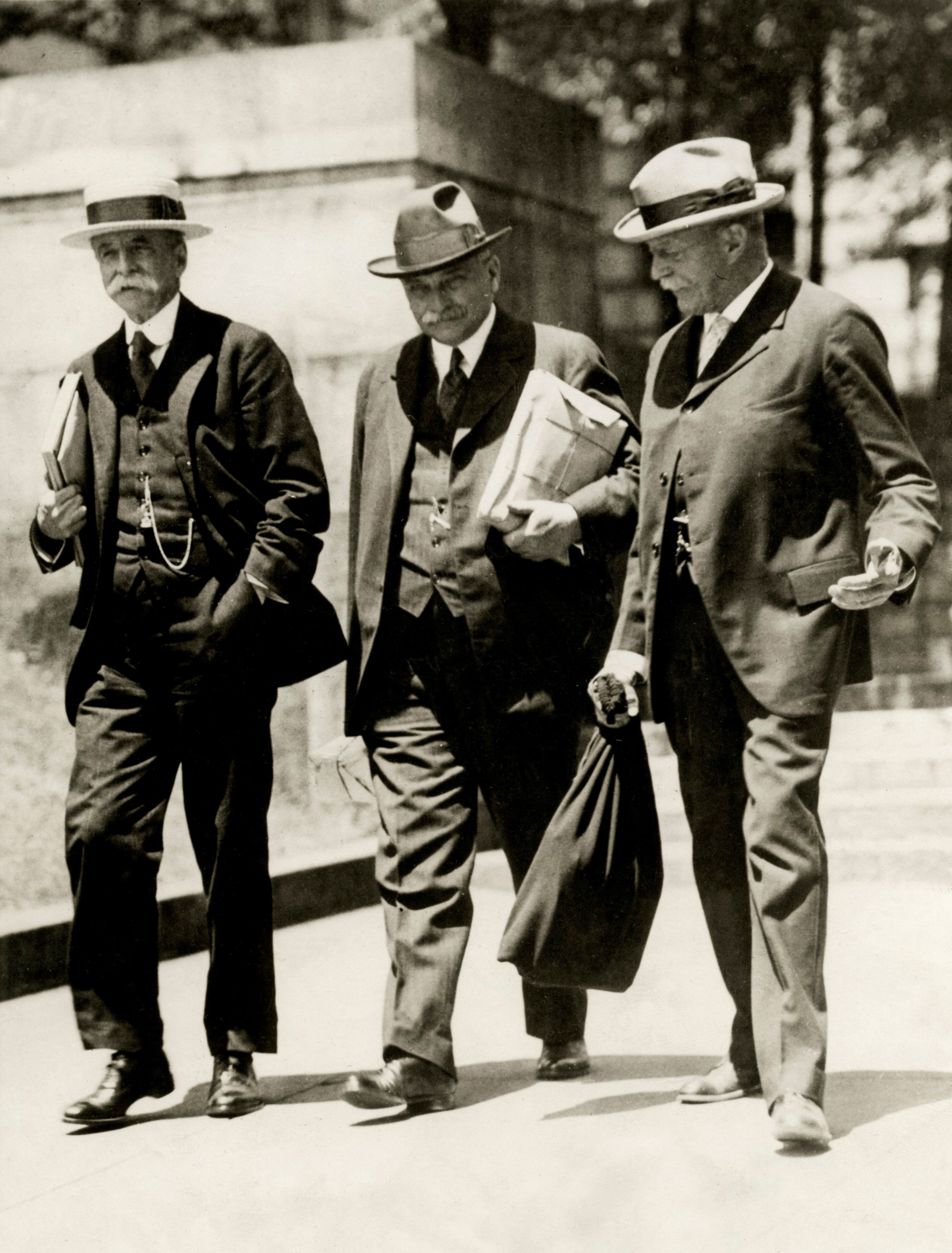
Grant, Stratton, and Lowell in 1927

In response to public protests that greeted the sentencing, Massachusetts Governor Alvan T. Fuller faced last-minute appeals to grant clemency to Sacco and Vanzetti. On June 1, 1927, he appointed an Advisory Committee of three: President Abbott Lawrence Lowell of Harvard, President Samuel Wesley Stratton of MIT, and Probate Judge Robert Grant. They were presented with the task of reviewing the trial to determine whether it had been fair. Lowell's appointment was generally well received, for though he had controversy in his past, he had also at times demonstrated an independent streak. The defense attorneys considered resigning when they determined that the Committee was biased against the defendants, but some of the defendants' most prominent supporters, including Harvard Law Professor Felix Frankfurter and Judge Julian W. Mack of the U.S. Circuit Court of Appeals, persuaded them to stay because Lowell "was not entirely hopeless".

One of the defense attorneys, though ultimately very critical of the Committee's work, thought the Committee members were not really capable of the task the Governor set for them:

No member of the Committee had the essential sophistication that comes with experience in the trial of criminal cases. ... The high positions in the community held by the members of the Committee obscured the fact that they were not really qualified to perform the difficult task assigned to them.

He also thought that the Committee, particularly Lowell, imagined it could use its fresh and more powerful analytical abilities to outperform the efforts of those who had worked on the case for years, even finding evidence of guilt that professional prosecutors had discarded.

Grant was another establishment figure, a probate court judge from 1893 to 1923 and an Overseer of Harvard University from 1896 to 1921, and the author of a dozen popular novels. Some criticized Grant's appointment to the Committee, with one defense lawyer saying he "had a black-tie class concept of life around him", but Harold Laski in a conversation at the time found him "moderate". Others cited evidence of xenophobia in some of his novels, references to "riff-raff" and a variety of racial slurs. His biographer allows that he was "not a good choice", not a legal scholar, and handicapped by age. Stratton, the one member who was not a "Boston Brahmin", maintained the lowest public profile of the three and hardly spoke during its hearings.

In their earlier appeals, the defense was limited to the trial record. The Governor's Committee, however, was not a judicial proceeding, so Judge Thayer's comments outside the courtroom could be used to demonstrate his bias. Once Thayer told reporters that "No long-haired anarchist from California can run this court!" According to the affidavits of eyewitnesses, Thayer also lectured members of his clubs, calling Sacco and Vanzetti "Bolsheviki!" and saying he would "get them good and proper". During the Dedham trial's first week, Thayer said to reporters: "Did you ever see a case in which so many leaflets and circulars have been spread ... saying people couldn't get a fair trial in Massachusetts? You wait till I give my charge to the jury, I'll show them!" In 1924, Thayer confronted a Massachusetts lawyer at Dartmouth, his alma mater, and said: "Did you see what I did with those anarchistic bastards the other day. I guess that will hold them for a while. ... Let them go to the Supreme Court now and see what they can get out of them." The Committee knew that, following the verdict, Boston Globe reporter Frank Sibley, who had covered the trial, wrote a protest to the Massachusetts attorney general condemning Thayer's blatant bias. Thayer's behavior both inside the courtroom and outside of it had become a public issue, with the New York World attacking Thayer as "an agitated little man looking for publicity and utterly impervious to the ethical standards one has the right to expect of a man presiding in a capital case."

On July 12–13, 1927, following testimony by the defense firearms expert Albert H. Hamilton before the Committee, the Assistant District Attorney for Massachusetts, Dudley P. Ranney, took the opportunity to cross-examine Hamilton. He submitted affidavits questioning Hamilton's credentials as well as his performance during the New York trial of Charles Stielow, in which Hamilton's testimony linking rifling marks to a bullet used to kill the victim nearly sent an innocent man to the electric chair. The Committee also heard from Braintree's police chief who told them he had found the cap on Pearl Street, allegedly dropped by Sacco during the crime, a full 24-hours after the getaway car had fled the scene. The chief doubted the cap belonged to Sacco and called the whole trial a contest "to see who could tell the biggest lies."

After two weeks of hearing witnesses and reviewing evidence, the Committee determined that the trial had been fair and a new trial was not warranted. They assessed the charges against Thayer as well. Their criticism, using words provided by Judge Grant, was direct: "He ought not to have talked about the case off the bench, and doing so was a grave breach of judicial decorum." But they also found some of the charges about his statements unbelievable or exaggerated, and they determined that anything he might have said had no impact on the trial. The panel's reading of the trial transcript convinced them that Thayer "tried to be scrupulously fair". The Committee also reported that the trial jurors were almost unanimous in praising Thayer's conduct of the trial.

A defense attorney later noted ruefully that the release of the Committee's report "abruptly stilled the burgeoning doubts among the leaders of opinion in New England." Supporters of the convicted men denounced the Committee. Harold Laski told Holmes that the Committee's work showed that Lowell's "loyalty to his class ... transcended his ideas of logic and justice."

Defense attorneys William G. Thompson and Herbert B. Ehrmann stepped down from the case in August 1927 and were replaced by Arthur D. Hill.

== Protests and advocacy ==
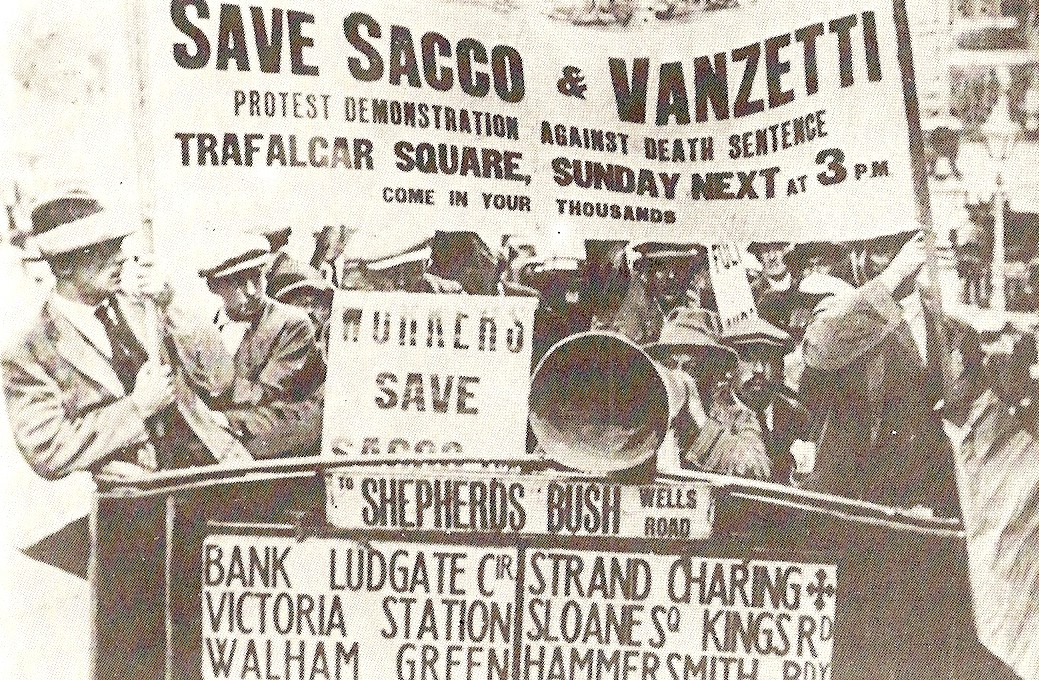
Protest for Sacco and Vanzetti in London, 1921

In 1924, referring to his denial of motions for a new trial, Judge Thayer confronted a Massachusetts lawyer: "Did you see what I did with those anarchistic bastards the other day?" the judge said. "I guess that will hold them for a while! Let them go and see now what they can get out of the Supreme Court!" The outburst remained a secret until 1927 when its release fueled the arguments of Sacco and Vanzetti's defenders. The New York World attacked Thayer as "an agitated little man looking for publicity and utterly impervious to the ethical standards one has the right to expect of a man presiding in a capital case."

Many socialists and intellectuals campaigned for a retrial without success. John Dos Passos came to Boston to cover the case as a journalist, stayed to author a pamphlet called Facing the Chair, and was arrested in a demonstration on August 10, 1927, along with writer Dorothy Parker, trade union organizer and Socialist Party leader Powers Hapgood and activist Catharine Sargent Huntington. After being arrested while picketing the State House, the poet Edna St. Vincent Millay pleaded her case to the governor in person and then wrote an appeal: "I cry to you with a million voices: answer our doubt ... There is need in Massachusetts of a great man tonight."

Others who wrote to Fuller or signed petitions included Albert Einstein, George Bernard Shaw and H. G. Wells. The president of the American Federation of Labor cited "the long period of time intervening between the commission of the crime and the final decision of the Court" as well as "the mental and physical anguish which Sacco and Vanzetti must have undergone during the past seven years" in a telegram to the governor.

Italian fascist dictator Benito Mussolini, the target of two anarchist assassination attempts, quietly made inquiries through diplomatic channels and was prepared to ask Governor Fuller to commute the sentences if it appeared his request would be granted.

In 1926, a bomb presumed to be the work of anarchists destroyed the house of Samuel Johnson, the brother of Simon Johnson and garage owner that called police the night of Sacco and Vanzetti's arrest.

In August 1927, the Industrial Workers of the World (IWW) called for a three-day nationwide walkout to protest the pending executions. The most notable response came in the Walsenburg coal district of Colorado, where 1,132 out of 1,167 miners participated in the walkout. It led to the Colorado coal strike of 1927.

=== Defendants in prison ===
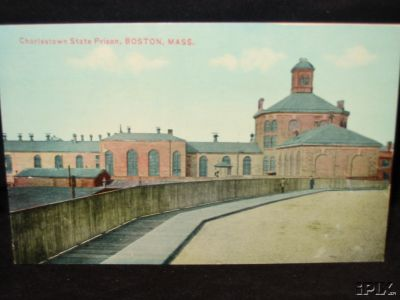
Charlestown State Prison, 1900

For their part, Sacco and Vanzetti seemed to alternate between moods of defiance, vengeance, resignation, and despair. The June 1926 issue of Protesta Umana, published by their Defense Committee, carried an article signed by Sacco and Vanzetti that appealed for retaliation by their colleagues. In the article, Vanzetti wrote, "I will try to see Thayer death [sic] before his pronunciation of our sentence", and asked fellow anarchists for "revenge, revenge in our names and the names of our living and dead." The article made a reference to La Salute è in voi!, the title of Galleani's bomb-making manual.

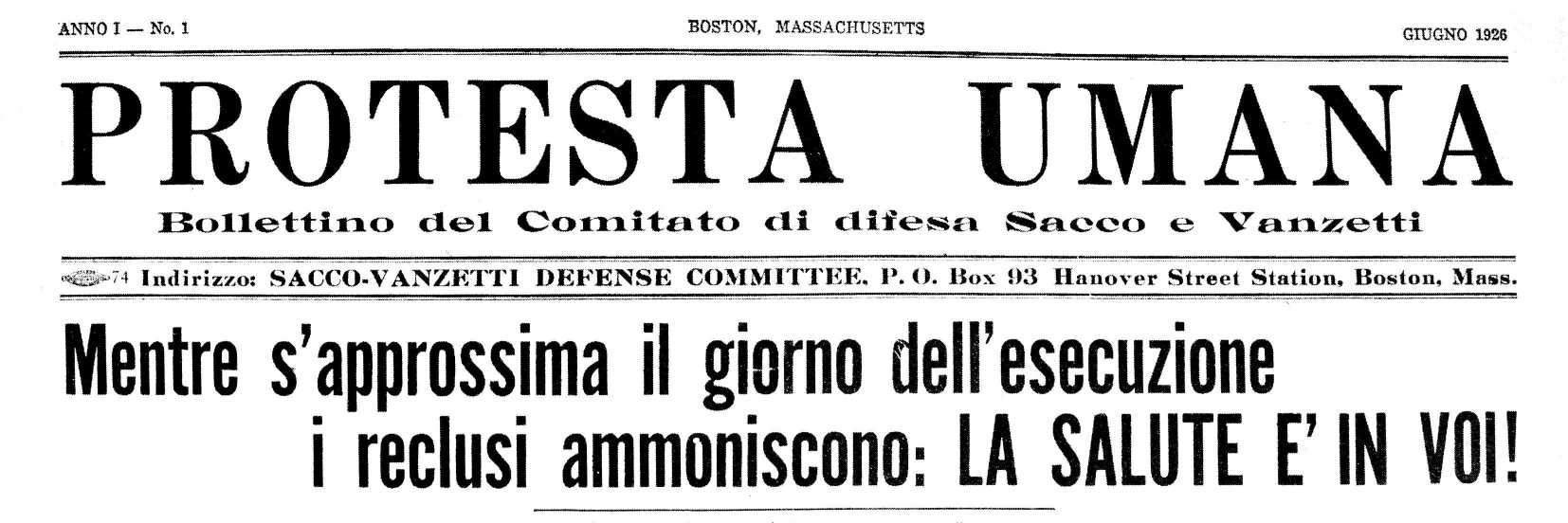
The Sacco-Vanzetti Defense Committee newspaper relays a message from Sacco and Vanzetti: "La Salute è in voi!"

Both wrote dozens of letters asserting their innocence, insisting they had been framed because they were anarchists. Their conduct in prison consistently impressed guards and wardens. In 1927, the Dedham jail chaplain wrote to the head of an investigatory commission that he had seen no evidence of guilt or remorse on Sacco's part. Vanzetti impressed fellow prisoners at Charlestown State Prison as a bookish intellectual, incapable of committing any violent crime. Novelist John Dos Passos, who visited both men in jail, observed of Vanzetti, "nobody in his right mind who was planning such a crime would take a man like that along." Vanzetti developed his command of English to such a degree that journalist Murray Kempton later described him as "the greatest writer of English in our century to learn his craft, do his work, and die all in the space of seven years."

During the trial, Supreme Court Justice Louis Brandeis, who was then in Washington, invited Sacco's wife to stay at his home near the courthouse. Sacco's seven-year-old son, Dante, would sometimes stand on the sidewalk outside of Norfolk County Jail and play catch with his father by throwing a ball over the wall.

== Execution and funeral ==
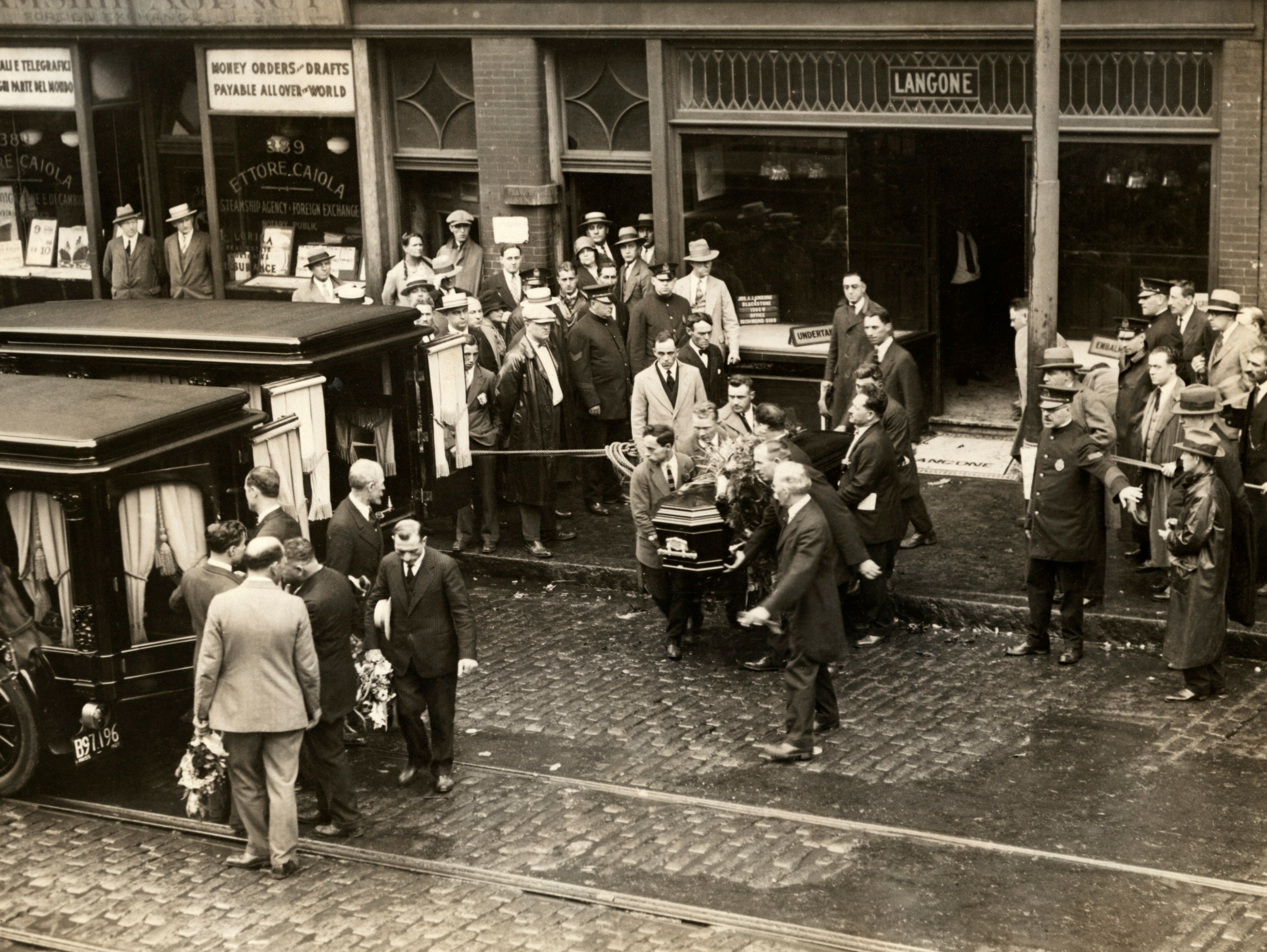
Carrying out the coffins of Sacco and Vanzetti from the funeral home in Boston.

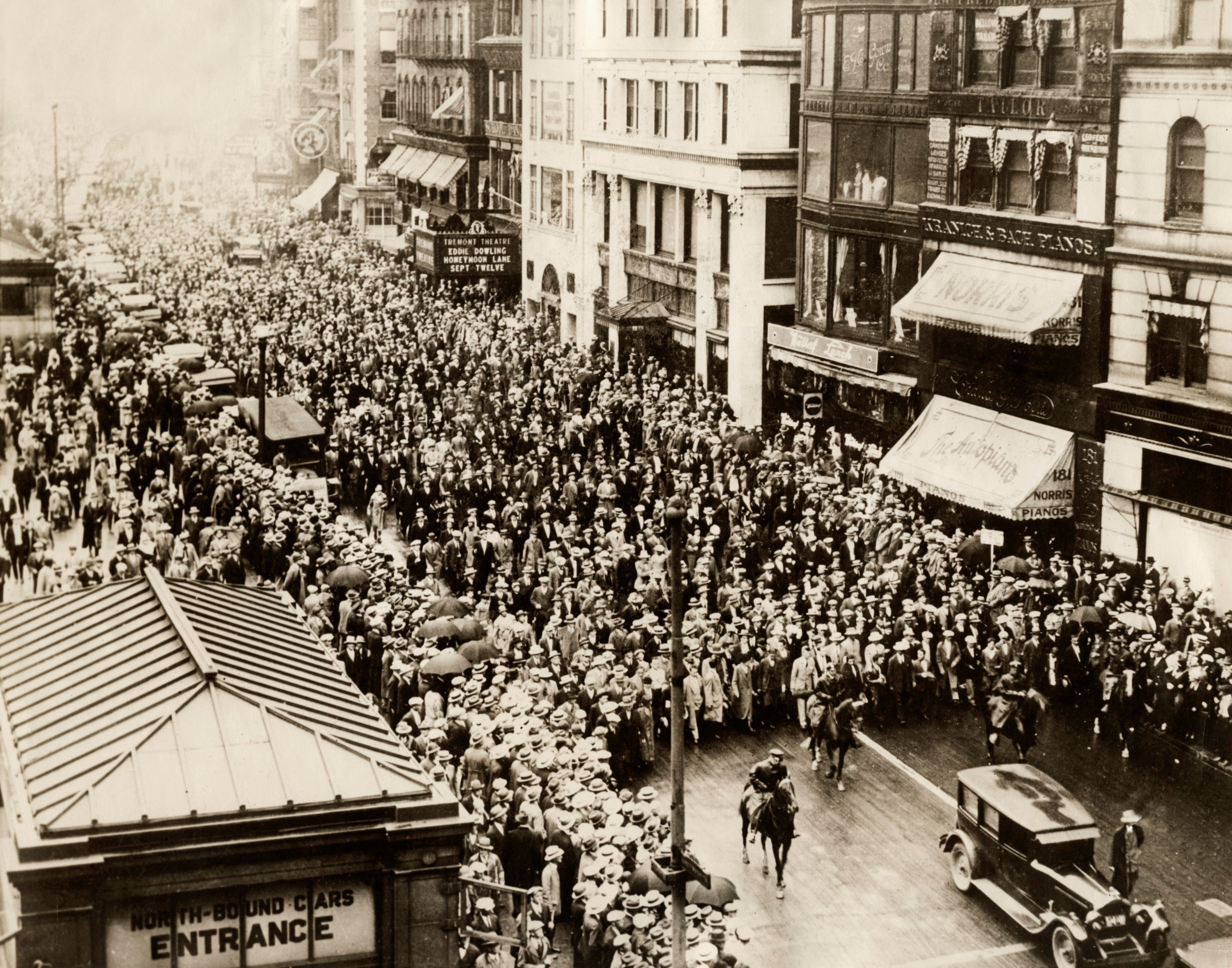
Thousands of people follow the hearses containing the remains of Sacco and Vanzetti on their way to the crematorium in Boston.

The executions were scheduled for midnight between August 22 and 23, 1927. On August 15, a bomb exploded at the home of one of the Dedham jurors. On Sunday, August 21, more than 20,000 protesters assembled on Boston Common.

At 8:40 p.m. on the evening before the execution, Warden Hendry visited the cells of all three condemned men to inform them it was his "painful duty" to tell them they must die that night. Vanzetti was the only one to respond, pacing his cell and saying "We must bow to the inevitable." Medeiros was asleep and appeared indifferent when awakened. Sacco was writing a letter to his father in Italy and begged the warden to mail it for him; Hendry promised he would. Chaplain Murphy accompanied the warden and again offered the consolation of the church; all three refused. Sacco and Vanzetti awaited execution in their cells at Charlestown State Prison, and both men refused a priest several times on their last day, as they were declared atheists. Their attorney William Thompson asked Vanzetti to make a statement opposing violent retaliation for his death and they discussed forgiving one's enemies. Thompson also asked Vanzetti to swear to his and Sacco's innocence one last time, and Vanzetti did. Celestino Medeiros, whose execution had been delayed in case his testimony was required at another trial of Sacco and Vanzetti, was executed first. Sacco was brought in next at 12:11 a.m.; walking with a pale face and steady gait, he cried "Long live anarchy" in Italian while seated in the chair, then said in broken English "Farewell, my wife and child and all my friends," before speaking his final words as executioner Robert Elliott threw his switch from behind a screen: "Farewell, Mother." Vanzetti was brought in at 12:20 a.m.; attendants seemed more to accompany than lead him, and he stopped to shake hands with his guards before sitting in the death seat without a tremor. He then delivered his final statement: "I wish to tell you I am innocent and never committed any crime, but sometimes some sin. I thank you for everything you have done. I am innocent of all crime, not only of this one, but all. I am an innocent man. I wish to forgive some people for what they are now doing to me." Vanzetti was pronounced dead at 12:26 a.m.; the triple execution was over before the day was half an hour old, as hundreds of police and troops with bayonets, pistols, and fire hoses who had guarded the prison began to disperse. Following the executions, death masks were made of the men.

Violent demonstrations swept through many cities the next day, including Geneva, London, Paris, Amsterdam, and Tokyo. In South America wildcat strikes closed factories. Three died in Germany, and protesters in Johannesburg burned an American flag outside the American embassy. It has been alleged that some of these activities were organized by the Communist Party.

At Langone Funeral Home in Boston's North End, more than 10,000 mourners viewed Sacco and Vanzetti in open caskets over two days. At the funeral parlor, a wreath over the caskets announced In attesa l'ora della vendetta (Awaiting the hour of vengeance). On Sunday, August 28, a two-hour funeral procession bearing huge floral tributes moved through the city. Thousands of marchers took part in the procession, and over 200,000 came out to watch. Police blocked the route, which passed the State House, and at one point mourners and the police clashed. The hearses reached Forest Hills Cemetery where, after a brief eulogy, the bodies were cremated. The Boston Globe called it "one of the most tremendous funerals of modern times". Will H. Hays, head of the motion picture industry's umbrella organization, ordered all film of the funeral procession destroyed.

After their cremation, Sacco and Vanzetti's ashes were taken onto the SS Conte Verde and repatriated to Italy. Sacco's ashes were sent to Torremaggiore, the town of his birth, where they are interred at the base of a monument erected in 1998. Vanzetti's ashes were buried with his mother in Villafalletto.

== Legacy ==
=== Continuing protests and analyses ===
Italian anarchist Severino Di Giovanni, one of the most vocal supporters of Sacco and Vanzetti in Argentina, bombed the American embassy in Buenos Aires a few hours after the two men were sentenced to death. A few days after the executions, Sacco's widow thanked Di Giovanni by letter for his support and added that the director of the tobacco firm Combinados had offered to produce a cigarette brand named "Sacco & Vanzetti". On November 26, 1927, Di Giovanni and others bombed a Combinados tobacco shop. On December 24, 1927, Di Giovanni blew up the headquarters of The National City Bank of New York and of the Bank of Boston in Buenos Aires in apparent protest of the execution. In December 1928, Di Giovanni and others failed in an attempt to bomb the train in which President-elect Herbert Hoover was traveling during his visit to Argentina.

Three months later, bombs exploded in the New York City Subway, in a Philadelphia church, and at the home of the mayor of Baltimore. The house of one of the jurors in the Dedham trial was bombed, throwing him and his family from their beds. On May 18, 1928, a bomb destroyed the front porch of the home of executioner Robert Elliott. As late as 1932, Judge Thayer's home was wrecked and his wife and housekeeper were injured in a bomb blast. Afterward, Thayer lived permanently at his club in Boston, guarded 24 hours a day until his death on April 18, 1933.

In October 1927, H. G. Wells wrote an essay that discussed the case at length. He called it "a case like the Dreyfus case, by which the soul of a people is tested and displayed." He felt that Americans failed to understand what about the case roused European opinion: However, many major cities in the United States held protests throughout the trial, proving otherwise.

The guilt or innocence of these two Italians is not the issue that has excited the opinion of the world. Possibly they were actual murderers, and still more possibly they knew more than they would admit about the crime. ... Europe is not "retrying" Sacco and Vanzetti or anything of the sort. It is saying what it thinks of Judge Thayer. Executing political opponents as political opponents after the fashion of Mussolini and Moscow we can understand, or bandits as bandits; but this business of trying and executing murderers as Reds, or Reds as murderers, seems to be a new and very frightening line for the courts of a State in the most powerful and civilized Union on earth to pursue.

In 1928, Upton Sinclair published his novel Boston, in which he inserted fictional characters into the trial and execution. He explored Vanzetti's life and writings, as its focus, and mixed fictional characters with historical participants in the trials. Though his portrait of Vanzetti was entirely sympathetic, Sinclair disappointed advocates for the defense by failing to absolve Sacco and Vanzetti of the crimes, however much he argued that their trial had been unjust. Years later, he explained: "Some of the things I told displeased the fanatical believers; but having portrayed the aristocrats as they were, I had to do the same thing for the anarchists." While doing research for the book, Sinclair was told confidentially by Sacco and Vanzetti's former lawyer Fred H. Moore that the two were guilty and that he (Moore) had supplied them with fake alibis; Sinclair was inclined to believe that that was, indeed, the case, and later referred to this as an "ethical problem", but he did not include the information about the conversation with Moore in his book.

When the letters Sacco and Vanzetti wrote appeared in print in 1928, journalist Walter Lippmann commented: "If Sacco and Vanzetti were professional bandits, then historians and biographers who attempt to deduce character from personal documents might as well shut up shop. By every test that I know of for judging character, these are the letters of innocent men." On January 3, 1929, as Gov. Fuller left the inauguration of his successor, he found a copy of the Letters thrust at him by someone in the crowd. He knocked it to the ground "with an exclamation of contempt."

Intellectual and literary supporters of Sacco and Vanzetti continued to speak out. In 1936, on the day when Harvard celebrated its 300th anniversary, 28 Harvard alumni issued a statement attacking the University's retired President Lowell for his role on the Governor's Advisory Committee in 1927. They included Heywood Broun, Malcolm Cowley, Granville Hicks, and John Dos Passos.

=== Massachusetts judicial reform ===
Following the SJC's assertion that it could not order a new trial even if there was new evidence that "would justify a different verdict", a movement for "drastic reform" quickly took shape in Boston's legal community. In December 1927, four months after the executions, the Massachusetts Judicial Council cited the Sacco and Vanzetti case as evidence of "serious defects in our methods of administering justice." It proposed a series of changes designed to appeal to both sides of the political divide, including restrictions on the number and timing of appeals. Its principal proposal addressed the SJC's right to review. It argued that a judge would benefit from a full review of a trial, and that no one man should bear the burden in a capital case. A review could defend a judge whose decisions were challenged and make it less likely that a governor would be drawn into a case. It asked for the SJC to have right to order a new trial "upon any ground if the interests of justice appear to inquire it." Governor Fuller endorsed the proposal in his January 1928 annual message.

The Judicial Council repeated its recommendations in 1937 and 1938. Finally, in 1939, the language it had proposed was adopted. Since that time, the SJC has been required to review all death penalty cases, to consider the entire case record, and to affirm or overturn the verdict on the law and on the evidence or "for any other reason that justice may require" (Mass. General Laws, 1939 ch. 341)

=== Historical viewpoints ===
Many historians, especially legal historians, have concluded the Sacco and Vanzetti prosecution, trial, and aftermath constituted a blatant disregard for political civil liberties, and especially criticize Thayer's decision to deny a retrial.

John W. Johnson has said that the authorities and jurors were influenced by strong anti-Italian prejudice and the prejudice against immigrants widely held at the time, especially in New England. Against charges of racism and racial prejudice, Paul Avrich and Brenda and James Lutz point out that both men were known anarchist members of a militant organization, members of which had been conducting a violent campaign of bombing and attempted assassinations, acts condemned by most Americans of all backgrounds. In addition, Berardelli was of Italian origin. Though in general anarchist groups did not finance their militant activities through bank robberies, a fact noted by the investigators of the Bureau of Investigation, this was not true of the Galleanist group. Mario Buda readily told an interviewer: "Andavamo a prenderli dove c'erano" ("We used to go and get it [money] where it was")—meaning factories and banks.

Johnson and Avrich suggest that the government prosecuted Sacco and Vanzetti for the robbery-murders as a convenient means to put a stop to their militant activities as Galleanists, whose bombing campaign at the time posed a lethal threat, both to the government and to many Americans. Faced with a secretive underground group whose members resisted interrogation and believed in their cause, Federal and local officials using conventional law enforcement tactics had been repeatedly stymied in their efforts to identify all members of the group or to collect enough evidence for a prosecution.

Most historians believe that Sacco and Vanzetti were involved at some level in the Galleanist bombing campaign, although their precise roles have not been determined. In 1955, Charles Poggi, a longtime anarchist and American citizen, traveled to Savignano in the Emilia-Romagna region of Italy to visit old comrades, including the Galleanists' principal bombmaker, Mario "Mike" Buda. While discussing the Braintree robbery, Buda told Poggi, "Sacco c'era" (Sacco was there). Poggi added that he "had a strong feeling that Buda himself was one of the robbers, though I didn't ask him and he didn't say." Whether Buda and Ferruccio Coacci, whose shared rental house contained the manufacturer's diagram of a .32 Savage automatic pistol (matching the .32 Savage pistol believed to have been used to shoot both Berardelli and Parmenter), had also participated in the Braintree robbery and murders would remain a matter of speculation.

=== Later evidence and investigations ===
In 1941, anarchist leader Carlo Tresca, a member of the Sacco and Vanzetti Defense Committee, told Max Eastman, "Sacco was guilty but Vanzetti was innocent", although it is clear from his statement that Tresca equated guilt only with the act of pulling the trigger, i.e., Vanzetti was not the principal triggerman in Tresca's view, but could have been an accomplice to Sacco. This conception of innocence is in sharp contrast to the legal one. Both The Nation and The New Republic refused to publish Tresca's revelation, which Eastman said occurred after he pressed Tresca for the truth about the two men's involvement in the shooting. The story finally appeared in National Review in October 1961. Others who had known Tresca confirmed that he had made similar statements to them, but Tresca's daughter insisted her father never hinted at Sacco's guilt. Others attributed Tresca's revelations to his disagreements with the Galleanists.

Labor organizer Anthony Ramuglia, an anarchist in the 1920s, said in 1952 that a Boston anarchist group had asked him to be a false alibi witness for Sacco. After agreeing, he had remembered that he had been in jail on the day in question, so he could not testify.

Both Sacco and Vanzetti had previously fled to Mexico, changing their names in order to evade draft registration, a fact the prosecutor in their murder trial used to demonstrate their lack of patriotism and which they were not allowed to rebut. Sacco and Vanzetti's supporters would later argue that the men fled the country to avoid persecution and conscription; their critics said they left to escape detection and arrest for militant and seditious activities in the United States. However, a 1953 Italian history of anarchism written by anonymous colleagues revealed a different motivation:

Several dozen Italian anarchists left the United States for Mexico. Some have suggested they did so because of cowardice. Nothing could be more false. The idea to go to Mexico arose in the minds of several comrades who were alarmed by the idea that, remaining in the United States, they would be forcibly restrained from leaving for Europe, where the revolution that had burst out in Russia that February intended to spread all over the continent.

In October 1961, firearm and bullet comparisons were conducted with improved technology on Sacco's Colt semi-automatic pistol. The results confirmed that the bullet that killed Berardelli in 1920 was fired from Sacco's pistol. The Thayer court's habit of mistakenly referring to Sacco's .32 Colt pistol as well as any other automatic pistol as a "revolver" (a common custom of the day) has sometimes mystified later-generation researchers attempting to follow the forensic evidence trail.

In 1987, Charlie Whipple, a former Boston Globe editorial page editor, revealed a conversation that he had with Sergeant Edward J. Seibolt in 1937. According to Whipple, Seibolt said that "we switched the murder weapon in that case", but indicated that he would deny this if Whipple ever printed it. However, at the time of the Sacco and Vanzetti trial, Seibolt was only a patrolman, and did not work in the Boston Police ballistics department; Seibolt died in 1961 without corroborating Whipple's story. In 1935, Captain Charles Van Amburgh, a key ballistics witness for the prosecution, wrote a six-part article on the case for a pulp detective magazine. Van Amburgh described a scene in which Thayer caught defense ballistics expert Hamilton trying to leave the courtroom with Sacco's gun. However, Thayer said nothing about such a move during the hearing on the gun barrel switch and refused to blame either side. Following the private hearing on the gun barrel switch, Van Amburgh kept Sacco's gun in his house, where it remained until the Boston Globe did an exposé in 1960.

In 1973, a former mobster published a confession by Frank "Butsy" Morelli, Joe's brother. "We whacked them out, we killed those guys in the robbery", Butsy Morelli told Vincent Teresa. "These two greaseballs Sacco and Vanzetti took it on the chin."

Before his death in June 1982, Giovanni Gambera, a member of the four-person team of anarchist leaders who met shortly after the arrest of Sacco and Vanzetti to plan their defense, told his son that "everyone [in the anarchist inner circle] knew that Sacco was guilty and that Vanzetti was innocent as far as the actual participation in killing."

Months before he died, the distinguished jurist Charles E. Wyzanski, Jr., who had presided for 45 years on the U.S. District Court in Massachusetts, wrote to Russell stating, "I myself am persuaded by your writings that Sacco was guilty." The judge's assessment was significant, because he was one of Felix Frankfurter's "Hot Dogs", and Justice Frankfurter had advocated his appointment to the federal bench.

The Los Angeles Times published an article on December 24, 2005, "Sinclair Letter Turns Out to Be Another Exposé", which refers to a newly discovered letter from Upton Sinclair to attorney John Beardsley in which Sinclair, a socialist writer famous for his muckraking novels, revealed a conversation with Fred Moore, attorney for Sacco and Vanzetti. In that conversation, in response to Sinclair's request for the truth, Moore stated that both Sacco and Vanzetti were in fact guilty, and that Moore had fabricated their alibis in an attempt to avoid a guilty verdict. The Los Angeles Times interprets subsequent letters as indicating that, to avoid loss of sales to his radical readership, particularly abroad, and due to fears for his own safety, Sinclair didn't change the premise of his novel in that respect. However, Sinclair also expressed in those letters doubts as to whether Moore deserved to be trusted in the first place, and he did not actually assert the innocence of the two in the novel, focusing instead on the argument that the trial they got was not fair.

=== Dukakis proclamation ===
In 1977, as the 50th anniversary of the executions approached, Massachusetts Governor Michael Dukakis asked the Office of the Governor's Legal Counsel to report on "whether there are substantial grounds for believing—at least in the light of the legal standards of today—that Sacco and Vanzetti were unfairly convicted and executed" and recommend an appropriate action. The resulting "Report to the Governor in the Matter of Sacco and Vanzetti" detailed grounds for doubting that the trial was conducted fairly in the first instance, and argued as well that such doubts were only reinforced by "later-discovered or later-disclosed evidence". The report questioned prejudicial cross-examination that the trial judge allowed, the judge's hostility, the fragmentary nature of the evidence, and eyewitness testimony that came to light after the trial. It found the judge's charge to the jury troubling for the way it emphasized the defendants' behavior at the time of their arrest and highlighted certain physical evidence that was later called into question. The report also dismissed the argument that the trial had been subject to judicial review, noting that "the system for reviewing murder cases at the time ... failed to provide the safeguards now present."

Based on recommendations which were made by the Office of Legal Counsel, Dukakis declared that August 23, 1977, the 50th anniversary of their execution, was Nicola Sacco and Bartolomeo Vanzetti Memorial Day. His proclamation, issued in English and Italian, stated that Sacco and Vanzetti had been unfairly tried and convicted and that "any disgrace should be forever removed from their names." He did not pardon them, because that would imply they were guilty. Neither did he assert their innocence. A resolution to censure Dukakis failed in the Massachusetts Senate by a vote of 23 to 12. Dukakis later expressed regret only for not reaching out to the families of the victims of the crime.

== Later tributes ==
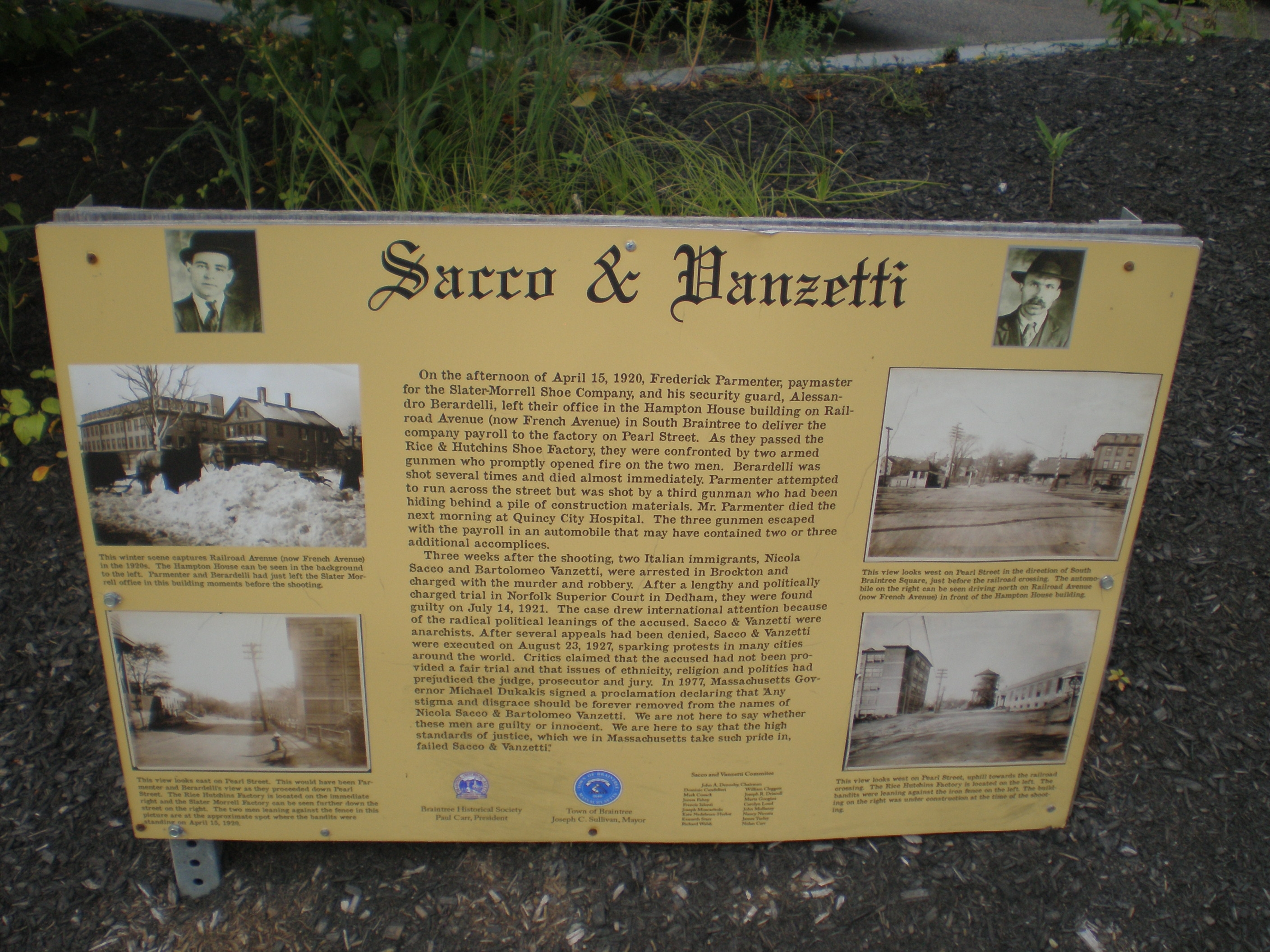
Memorial poster, French Ave and Pearl St, Braintree, Massachusetts

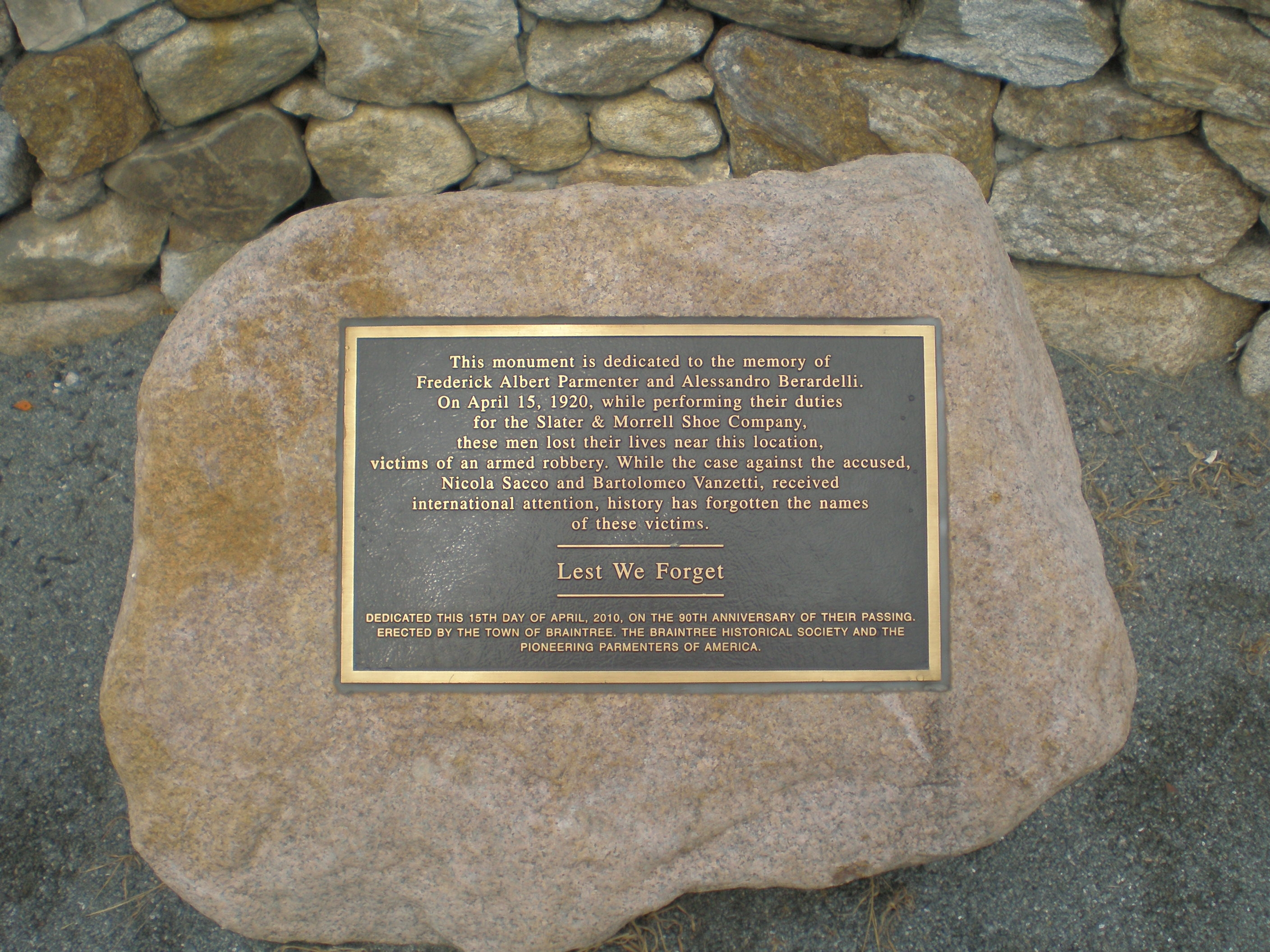
Memorial to the victims, French Ave and Pearl St, Braintree, Massachusetts

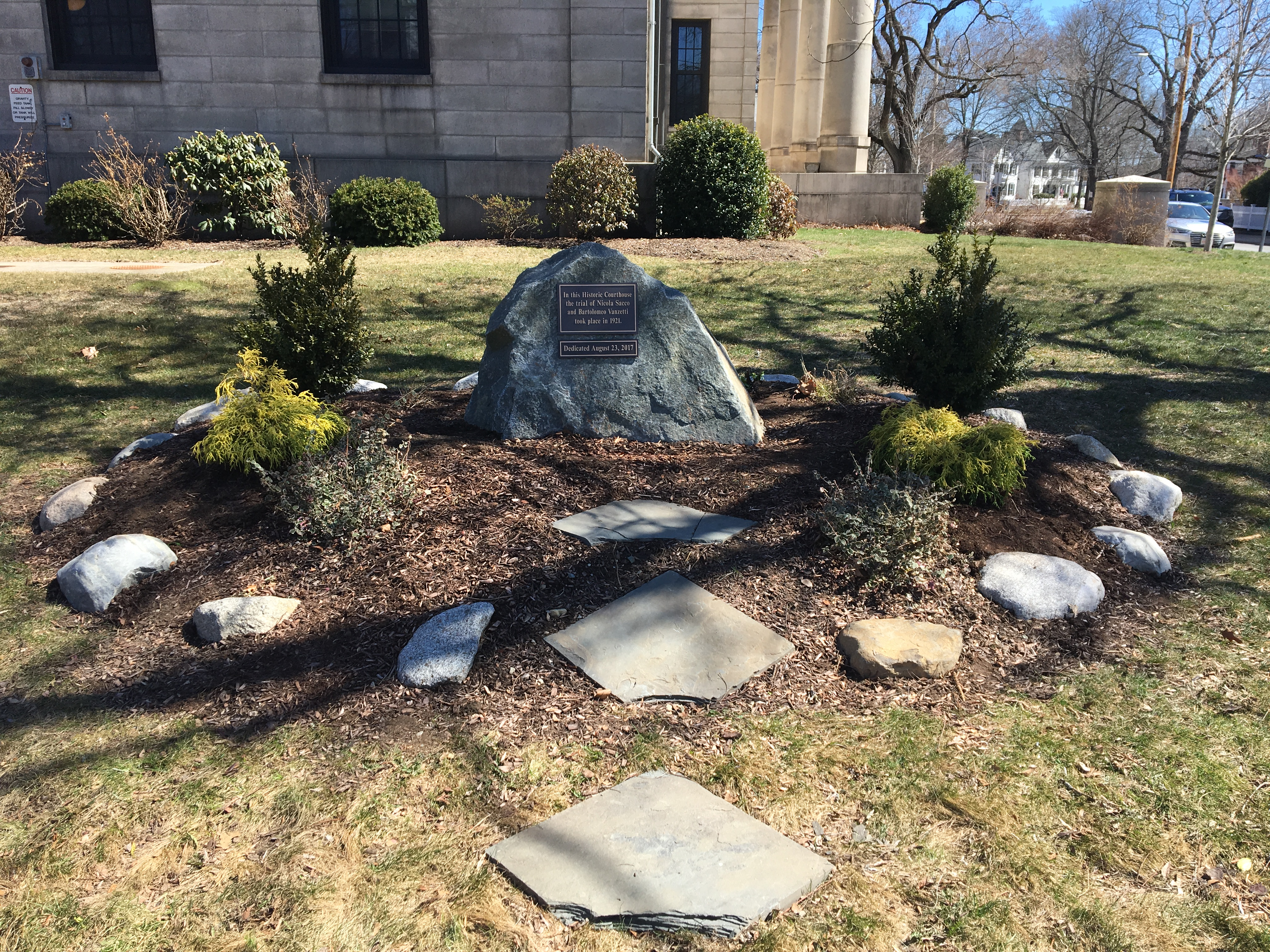
A monument to the trial of Sacco and Vanzetti outside the Norfolk Superior Court in Dedham, Massachusetts.

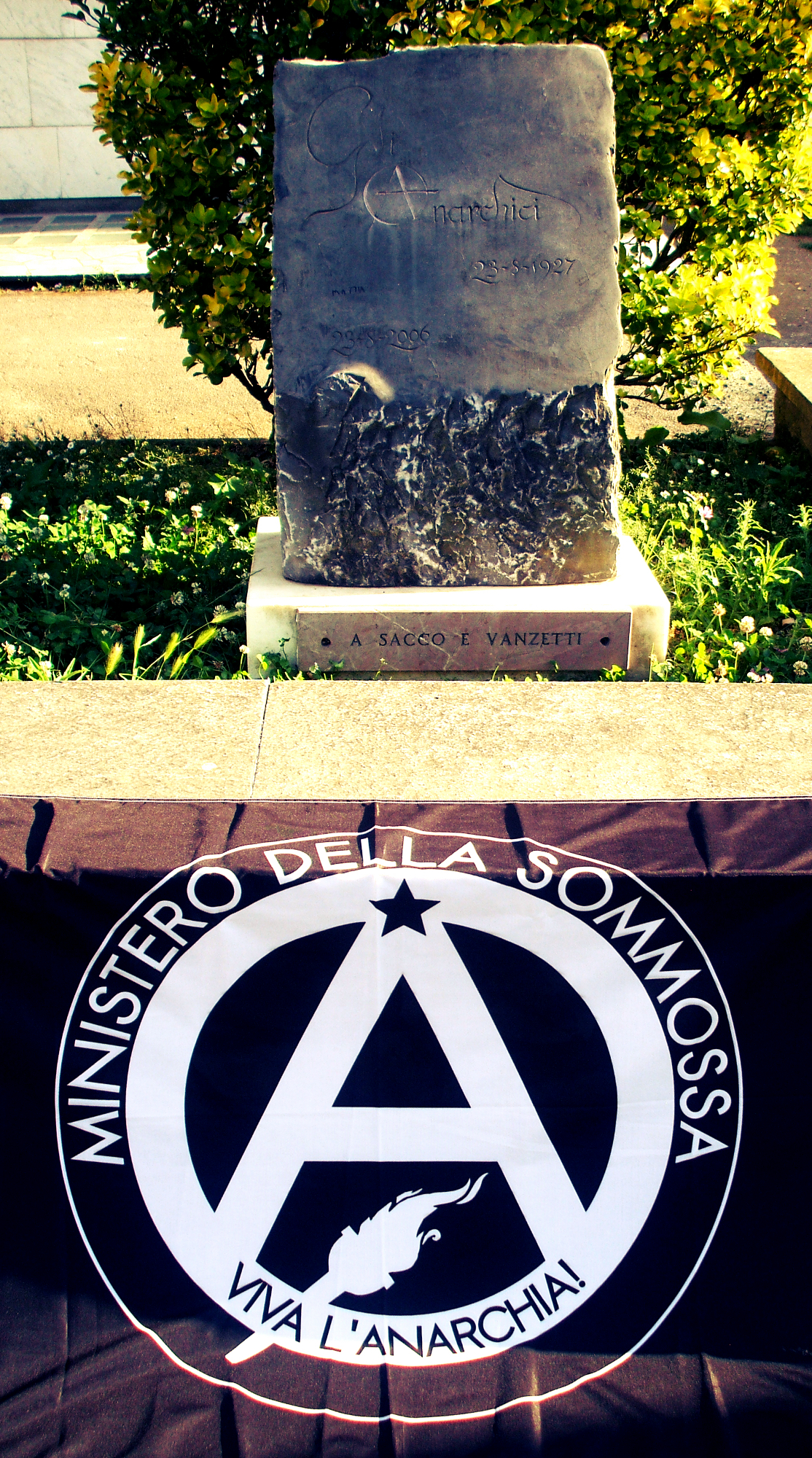
The Sacco e Vanzetti monument in Carrara.

A memorial committee tried to present a plaster cast that was constructed in 1937 by Gutzon Borglum, the sculptor of Mount Rushmore, to Massachusetts governors and Boston mayors in 1937, 1947, and 1957 without success. On August 23, 1997, on the 70th anniversary of the Sacco and Vanzetti executions, Boston's first Italian-American Mayor, Thomas Menino, and the Italian-American Governor of Massachusetts, Paul Cellucci, unveiled the work at the Boston Public Library, where it remains on display:

"The city's acceptance of this piece of artwork is not intended to reopen debate about the guilt or innocence of Sacco and Vanzetti," Menino said. "It is intended to remind us of the dangers of miscarried justice, and the right we all have to a fair trial."

The event occasioned a renewed debate about the fairness of the trial in the editorial pages of the Boston Herald.

A mosaic mural portraying the trial of Sacco and Vanzetti is installed on the main campus of Syracuse University. In Braintree, Massachusetts, on the corner of French Avenue and Pearl Street, a memorial marks the site of the murders. The memorial has two exhibits. The first is a weatherproof poster that discusses the crime and the subsequent trial. The second exhibit is a metal plaque that memorializes the victims of the crime.

The "Sacco and Vanzetti Centuria" was an American anarchist military unit in the Durruti Column that fought in the Spanish Civil War.

Many sites in the former USSR are named after "Sacco and Vanzetti": for example, a beer-production facility in Moscow, a kolkhoz in Donetsk region, Ukraine; and a street and an apartment complex in Yekaterinburg. 'Sacco and Vanzetti' was also a popular brand of Russian pencil from 1930 to 2007. Numerous towns in Italy have streets named after Sacco and Vanzetti, including Via Sacco-Vanzetti in Torremaggiore, Sacco's home town; and Villafalletto, Vanzetti's.

In Bakhmut Raion in Eastern Ukraine, there is Sakko i Vantsetti, a small village that is named after them, and it was occupied by Russian forces from February to mid-May 2023 during the Battle of Bakhmut.

In 2017, as part of an Eagle Scout project, a plaque was placed outside of Norfolk Superior Court commemorating the trial. The Justinian Law Society of Massachusetts owns the bound transcripts of the trial, with a verbatim transcription of testimony, objections, and statements by the attorneys and judge in the case. In 2024, they loaned the books to the Dedham Museum and Archive for curation.

== References in popular culture ==
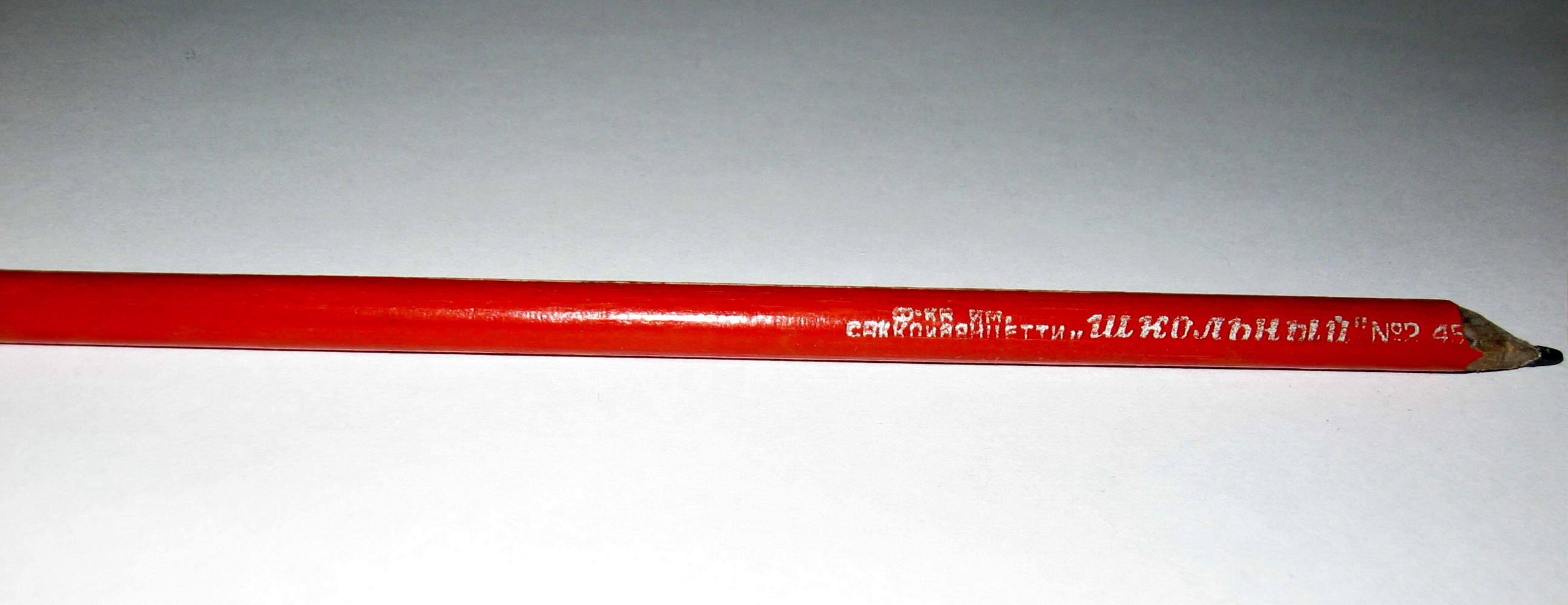
1940s Russian pencil showing the 'Sacco & Vanzetti' name in Cyrillic lettering

=== Plays ===
- James Thurber and Elliot Nugent's 1940 play The Male Animal turns on a college professor's insistence on reading Vanzetti's statement at sentencing to his English composition class. It was adapted as a film the next year, starring Henry Fonda and Olivia de Havilland.
- In 1992, Argentinian playwright Mauricio Kartun premiered Sacco y Vanzetti: dramaturgia sumario de documentos sobre el caso, under the direction of Jaime Kogan
- In 2000, the play Voices on the Wind by Eric Paul Erickson centers around the final hours of the lives of Sacco and Vanzetti. Former Massachusetts Governor Michael Dukakis recorded an audio clip of his public statement on the 50th anniversary of their execution for the production.
- In 2014, Joseph Silovsky wrote and performed in an Off-Broadway play about Sacco and Vanzetti, Send for the Million Men.

=== Films and television ===
- Sacco-Vanzetti Story was presented on television in 1960. The two-part drama starred Martin Balsam as Sacco and Steven Hill as Vanzetti.
- In 1965, the BBC produced The Good Shoemaker and the Poor Fish Peddler, a TV movie about the case.
- Sacco & Vanzetti, a 1971 film by Italian director Giuliano Montaldo covers the case, and it stars Riccardo Cucciolla and Gian Maria Volonté as Sacco and Vanzetti. Joan Baez performed the song "Here's To You" (music by Ennio Morricone, lyrics by Baez) for the film. This same song was later used in the 2008 video game Metal Gear Solid 4: Guns of the Patriots as well as in its 2014 successor Metal Gear Solid V: Ground Zeroes.
- In the 1971 TV show, Room 222, Episode "The Sins of the Fathers", aired Dec 10, 1971, the students use this case to retry in class.
- In the 1972 comedy film Avanti!, an American in Italy played by Jack Lemmon frustratedly asks, "Is this Italian justice?" and gets the response, "What about Sacco and Vanzetti?"
- The 2006 documentary Sacco and Vanzetti was directed by Peter Miller. Produced by Peter Miller and Editor Amy Linton, the film presents interviews with researchers and historians of the lives of Nicola Sacco and Bartolomeo Vanzetti, and it also presents interviews with historians and researchers of their trial. It also presents forensic evidence that refutes the forensic evidence which was used by the prosecution during the trial. Prison letters which were written by the defendants are read by voice actors with Tony Shalhoub as Sacco and John Turturro as Vanzetti. Interviewees include Howard Zinn, Studs Terkel, and Arlo Guthrie.
- Sacco and Vanzetti are briefly mentioned in season 1 episode 8 of The Sopranos, with Tony Soprano's son, Anthony Jr., mistaking them for the Antichrist until being corrected that the word he was thinking of was "anarchist".
- Sacco and Vanzetti were briefly mentioned in season 4 episode 4 of The Marvelous Mrs. Maisel, when Asher mentions to Abe "they had great lawyers too and must've been a great comfort to them as they sat in their electric chairs listening to their brains melt".
- Sacco and Vanzetti are mentioned in season 8, episode 15 of the TV series, The Practice.

=== Music ===
- In 1927, six Italian- and Neapolitan-language 78 rpm recordings on the topic of Sacco and Vanzetti were recorded by Italian immigrant artists on U.S. record labels: “A morte e Sacco e Vanzetti” (The death of Sacco and Vanzetti) sung by Giuseppe Milano; “I martiri d’un ideale” (Martyrs for an ideal), a spoken-word piece performed by F. De Renzis; “Lacreme ‘e cundannate (ovvero Sacco e Vanzetti)” (Tears for the condemned [or Sacco and Vanzetti]) and “Lettera a Sacco (P’o figlio suoio) (Letter to Sacco [For his son])” sung by Alfredo Bascetta; “Protesta per Sacco e Vanzetti (Protest on behalf of Sacco and Vanzetti), performed by the Compagnia Columbia; and “Sacco e Vanzetti” sung by Raoul Romito. The latter two recordings were listed on the Library of Congress's 2019 National Recording Registry.
- In 1932, composer Ruth Crawford Seeger wrote the song "Sacco, Vanzetti" on commission from the Society of Contemporary Music in Philadelphia.
- American folk singer Woody Guthrie recorded a series of songs in 1946–1947 known as the Ballads of Sacco & Vanzetti, eventually released in 1960.
- In 1963, Pulitzer Prize-winning American composer Roger Reynolds set selections of Vanzetti's letters to music in the chamber work Portrait of Vanzetti for narrator, mixed ensemble, and electronics.
- American composer Marc Blitzstein started an opera about Sacco and Vanzetti, which was unfinished at the time of his death in 1964; Leonard Lehrman completed the work, Sacco and Vanzetti, which premiered in 2001.
- The 1971 song "Here's to You" by Joan Baez and Ennio Morricone is a tribute to them and became a symbol for the human rights movement of the 1970s. The two also wrote "The Ballad of Sacco and Vanzetti". Georges Moustaki adapted the song under the new title of "Marche de Sacco et Vanzetti" for his 1971 album Il y avait un jardin (There was a garden).
- In 1976, the German folk group Manderley included the song "Sacco's Brief" (Sacco's Letter) on their album Fliegt, Gedanken, fliegt.
- American folk singer Charles King wrote the song "Two Good Arms" about Sacco and Vanzetti in 1977 on the 50th anniversary of their death. The song has been performed by Holly Near and Ronnie Gilbert. The song has been widely performed within the folk revival tradition, including a version by British folk singer Roy Bailey recorded on his album Freedom Peacefully (Fuse Records, 1985)."Two Good Arms". Rise Up Singing."Freedom Peacefully – Roy Bailey".
- The song "Facing the Chair" about Sacco & Vanzetti, composed by Andy Irvine, was recorded by Patrick Street for their 1988 album, No. 2 Patrick Street. Bruce Molsky recorded the song on his 2022 CD, Everywhere You Go.
- In 2001, Anton Coppola premiered his opera Sacco and Vanzetti.

=== Written works, paintings ===
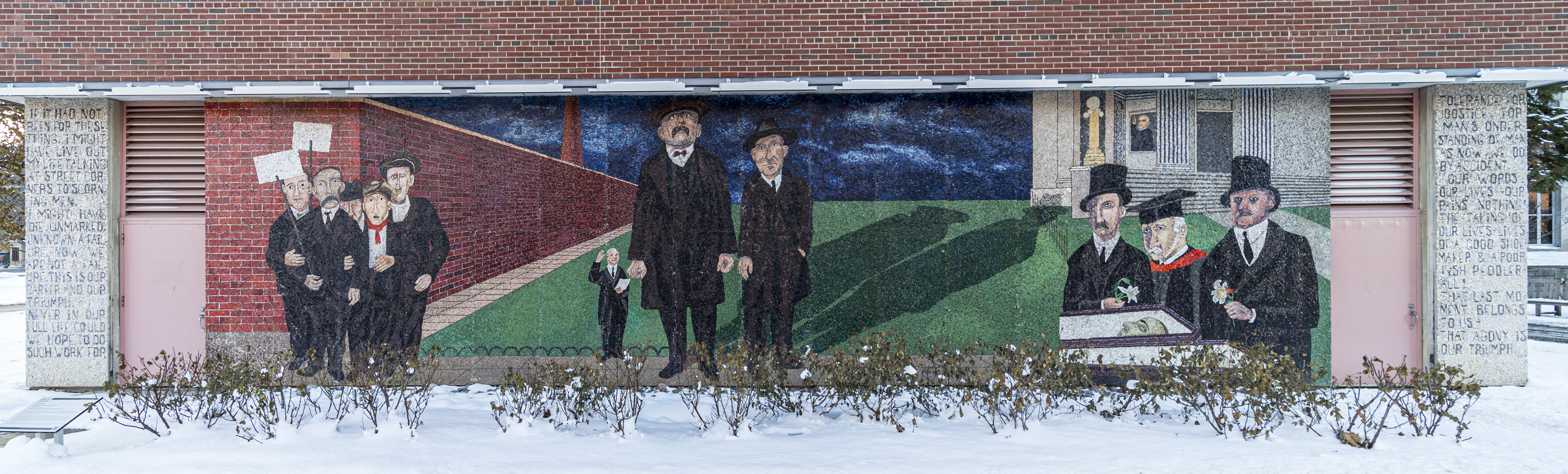
Mosaic The Passion of Sacco and Vanzetti by Ben Shahn at Syracuse University (1967)

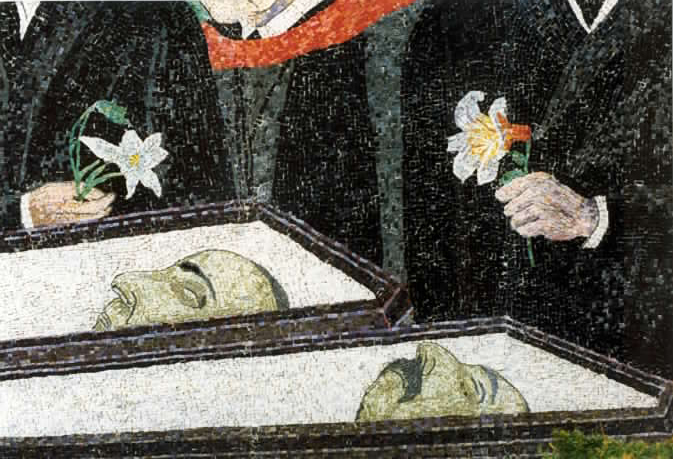
Mosaic detail of Sacco and Vanzetti lying dead in their coffins, by Ben Shahn

- Upton Sinclair's 1928 book Boston is a fictional interpretation of the affair.
- H. G. Wells's 1928 book Mr. Blettsworthy on Rampole Island refers to the case and the main character's reaction to it.
- In the early 1930s, Ben Shahn produced a series of works related to the case, notably The Passion of Sacco and Vanzetti, owned by the Whitney Museum of American Art in New York City. A similar 60-by-12-foot mural by Shahn, executed in marble and enamel, is installed on the east wall of Huntington Beard Crouse Hall at Syracuse University.
- In F. Scott Fitzgerald's short story "Six of One—" (1932), one of the characters is said to have been "arrested in the Sacco-Vanzetti demonstrations".
- The chapter 'Holding the Fort: The Night Sacco and Vanzetti Died' of Frank Moorhouse's 1993 novel Grand Days depicts the violent demonstrations in Geneva following the execution.
- In 1935, Maxwell Anderson's drama Winterset presented the story of a man who attempts to clear the name of his Italian immigrant father who has been executed for robbery and murder. It was adapted as a feature film a year later.
- In 1936, the third novel in John Dos Passos' U.S.A. trilogy, The Big Money, Mary French works on the Sacco and Vanzetti Defense Committee and is arrested protesting their imminent executions.
- James T. Farrell's 1946 novel Bernard Clare uses the anti-Italian sentiment provoked by coverage of the case and the crowd scene in New York City's Union Square awaiting news of the executions as critical plot elements.
- Mark Binelli presented the two as a Laurel-and-Hardy-like comedy team in the 2006 novel Sacco and Vanzetti Must Die!
- The trial is discussed in detail in Kurt Vonnegut's 1979 novel Jailbird, where Vonnegut suggests that the case, especially Medeiros' confession, is a modern-day parallel to the crucifixion of Jesus.
- Rick Geary wrote a 2011 graphic novel titled The Lives of Sacco & Vanzetti as part of his Treasury of XXth Century Murder series.
- In the novel Vita Nostra by Marina and Sergey Dyachenko, (Maryna and Serhiy Dyachenko) the Institute for Special Technologies is on Sacco and Vanzetti street.
- In the novel Paradies Amerika by Egon Kisch, Sacco and Vanzetti are mentioned as victims of a "barbaric judicial murder".
- Margo Laurie's 2022 novella The Anarchist's Wife is a fictionalized depiction of the Sacco and Vanzetti case.
- Italian-American author Miriam Polli's 2025 novel Rosina is a fictionalized account of Rosina's experience and relationship with Nicco.

=== Poetry ===
- John Dos Passos wrote the poem "They Are Dead Now", about the executions of Sacco and Vanzetti.
- In his poem "America", Allen Ginsberg presents a catalog of slogans that includes the line: "Sacco and Vanzetti must not die".
- Carl Sandburg described the execution of Sacco and Vanzetti in his poem "Legal Midnight Hour".
- Edna St. Vincent Millay wrote a poem after the executions titled "Justice Denied In Massachusetts".
- William Carlos Williams wrote a poem entitled "Impromptu: The Suckers" in response to the trial.
- The Welsh poet Alun Lewis, who died in World War II, wrote a poem in the form of a dramatic monologue titled "Sacco Writes to his Son".

== See also ==
- Edward Holton James
- List of people executed in the United States in 1927
- List of people executed in Massachusetts

== Works cited ==
- Avrich, Paul (1991). Sacco and Vanzetti: The Anarchist Background. Princeton, New Jersey: Princeton University Press.ISBN 9780691026046
- Parr, James L. (2009). Dedham: Historic and Heroic Tales from Shiretown. Arcadia Publishing Incorporated. ISBN 9781625842770.
