= Detroit City Is the Place to Be =

Book

- First edition (US)
- Author: Mark Binelli
- Publication date: 2012

Detroit City Is the Place to Be: The Afterlife of an American Metropolis is a 2012 book by Mark Binelli, published by Picador (UK) and by Metropolitan Books (US). The book was later published in the United Kingdom by Bodley Head under the title The Last Days of Detroit: Motor Cars, Motown and the Collapse of an Industrial Giant.

Binelli, a contributing editor of Rolling Stone and a novelist, originates from a suburb of Detroit. Nicholas Hune-Brown of Canadian Business described the book as "a sympathetic portrait of a city managing its own decline and groping its way toward a new 21st-century identity".

Using a series of essays, the book discusses the history of the city and the movements to restore the city from its decline. The history is in the beginning and the later part discusses the revival attempts. Binelli expresses skepticism of several proposals on reviving the city, but he believes there are some indicators that a recovery will come. Kirkus Reviews wrote that "many readers" would be favorable to the format of the article appearing like "a series of magazine articles" since the readers may "absorb the book in bite-sized chunks that can make reading about Detroit's urban blight more palatable" even though some persons may criticize the book for having this style.

== Reception ==
Publishers Weekly wrote that the book is "a wildly compelling biography of a city as well as a profound commentary on postindustrial America." Publishers Weekly ranked the book as one of the "Best Books of 2012".

Kirkus Reviews concluded that the book is "An informative, often-heartbreaking portrait of a once-great American metropolis gone to hell."

Jay Freeman of Booklist concluded "This is an engaging and hopeful glimpse of a city struggling to reinvent itself."

In a review for The Telegraph, Melanie McGrath described the book as "a story told with vitality, wit and affection." McGrath stated "Some of the detail of local politics may lose a British reader".

== See also ==
- Detroit: An American Autopsy
- Sacco and Vanzetti Must Die! (novel by Binelli)
