= Brooklyn Bridge =

Bridge in New York City

- View from Brooklyn towards Manhattan, 2026
- Coordinates: 40.7057°N 73.9964°W
- Carries: 5 lanes of roadway Elevated trains (until 1944); Streetcars (until 1950); Pedestrians and bicycles
- Crosses: East River
- Locale: New York City (Civic Center, Manhattan – Dumbo/Brooklyn Heights, Brooklyn)
- Maintained by: New York City Department of Transportation
- ID number: 22400119

Characteristics
- Design: Cable-stayed suspension bridge
- Total length: 6,016 ft (1,833.7 m; 1.1 mi) (Note: Sources disagree on whether the length of the Brooklyn Bridge is 6,016 feet (1,834 m) or 5,989 feet (1,825 m).)
- Width: 85 ft (25.9 m)
- Height: 272 ft (82.9 m) (towers)
- Longest span: 1,595.5 ft (486.3 m)
- Clearance below: 127 ft (38.7 m) above mean high water

History
- Designer: John A. Roebling
- Engineering design by: Washington Roebling; Emily Warren Roebling
- Constructed by: New York Bridge Company
- Opened: May 24, 1883; 143 years ago

Statistics
- Daily traffic: 121,930 (2019)
- Toll: Free (Manhattan-bound to FDR Drive north, and Brooklyn-bound); Variable congestion charge (Manhattan-bound to all other exits)
- Brooklyn Bridge
- U.S. National Register of Historic Places
- U.S. National Historic Landmark
- New York State Register of Historic Places
- New York City Landmark
- Built: 1869–1883
- Architectural style: Gothic Revival
- NRHP reference No.: 66000523
- NYSRHP No.: 06101.001644
- NYCL No.: 0098

Significant dates
- Added to NRHP: October 15, 1966
- Designated NHL: January 29, 1964
- Designated NYSRHP: June 23, 1980
- Designated NYCL: August 24, 1967

Location
- Interactive map of Brooklyn Bridge

The Brooklyn Bridge is a cable-stayed suspension bridge in New York City, spanning the East River between the boroughs of Manhattan and Brooklyn. Opened on May 24, 1883, the Brooklyn Bridge was the first fixed crossing of the East River. It was also the longest suspension bridge in the world when opened, with a main span of 1,595.5 feet (486.3 m) and a deck 127 ft (38.7 m) above mean high water. The span was originally called the New York and Brooklyn Bridge or the East River Bridge but was officially renamed the Brooklyn Bridge in 1915.

Proposals for a bridge connecting Manhattan and Brooklyn were first made in the early 19th century; these plans evolved into what is now the Brooklyn Bridge, designed by John A. Roebling. The project's chief engineer, his son Washington Roebling, contributed further design work, assisted by the latter's wife, the engineer Emily Warren Roebling. Construction started in 1870 and was overseen by the New York Bridge Company, which in turn was controlled by the Tammany Hall political machine. Numerous controversies and the novelty of the design prolonged the project over thirteen years. After opening, the Brooklyn Bridge underwent several reconfigurations, having carried horse-drawn vehicles and elevated railway lines until 1950. To alleviate increasing traffic flows, additional bridges and tunnels were built across the East River. Due to gradual deterioration, the Brooklyn Bridge was renovated several times, including in the 1950s, 1980s, and 2010s.

The Brooklyn Bridge is the southernmost of five vehicular bridges connecting Manhattan Island and Long Island, with the Manhattan Bridge, the Williamsburg Bridge, the Queensboro Bridge, and the Robert F. Kennedy Bridge (formerly known as the Triborough Bridge) to the north. Only passenger vehicles and pedestrian and bicycle traffic are permitted. A major tourist attraction since it opened, the Brooklyn Bridge has become an icon of New York City. Over the years, the bridge has been used for stunts and performances, as well as several crimes, attacks and vandalism. The Brooklyn Bridge is designated a National Historic Landmark, a New York City landmark, and a National Historic Civil Engineering Landmark.

== Description ==
The Brooklyn Bridge, an early example of a steel-wire suspension bridge, (Note: Together with the Clifton Suspension Bridge of 1864) uses a hybrid design combining elements of cable-stayed and suspension bridges, with both vertical and diagonal suspender cables. Its stone towers are neo-Gothic, with characteristic pointed arches. The New York City Department of Transportation (NYCDOT), which maintains the bridge, says that its original paint scheme was "Brooklyn Bridge Tan" and "Silver", but other accounts state that it was originally entirely "Rawlins Red".

=== Deck ===
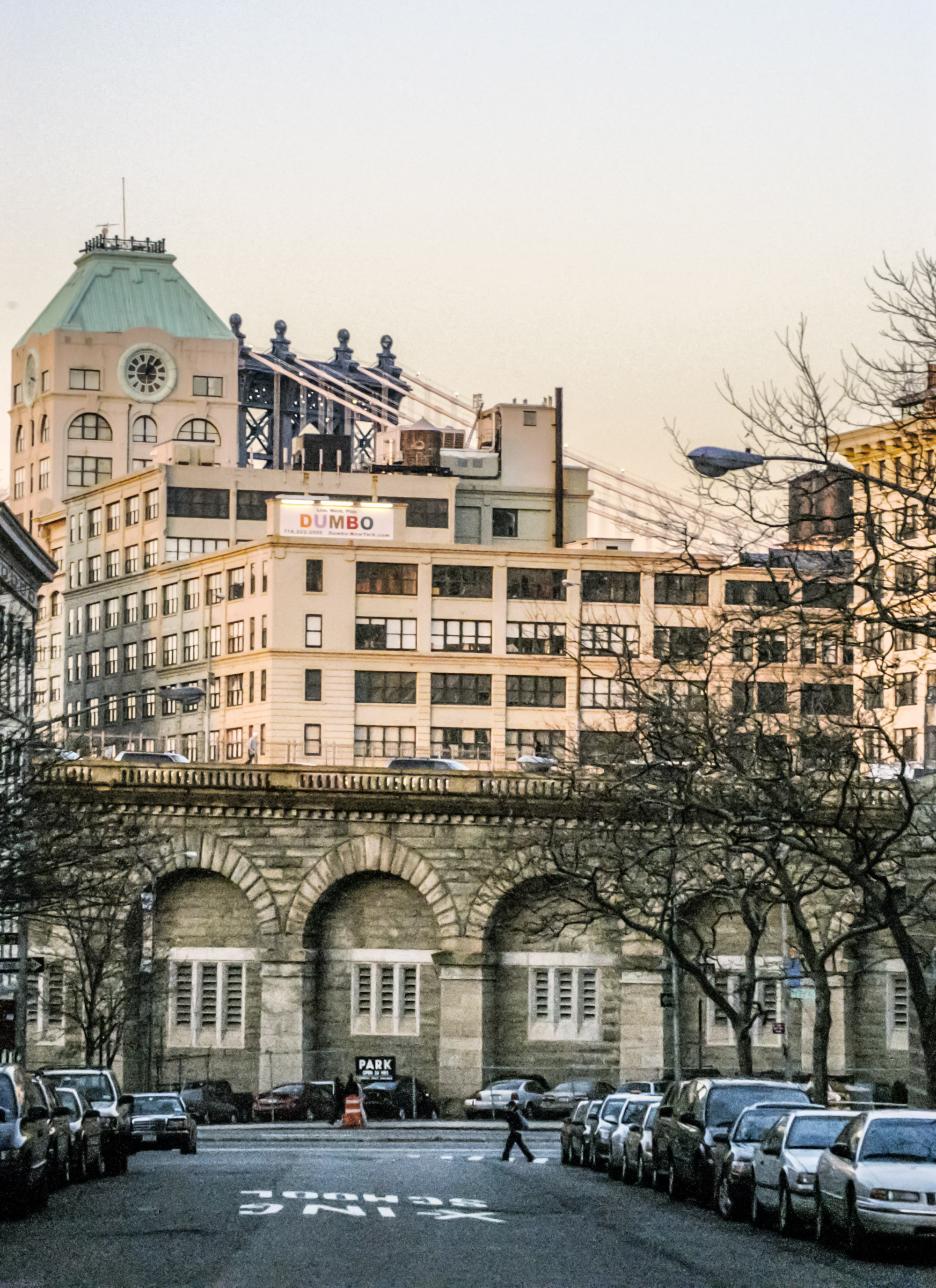
An approach ramp to the Brooklyn Bridge, seen from Brooklyn, with Manhattan Bridge (partially hidden by buildings) seen in the background

To provide sufficient clearance for shipping in the East River, the Brooklyn Bridge incorporates long approach viaducts on either end to raise it from low ground on both shores. Including approaches, the Brooklyn Bridge is a total of 6,016 feet (1,834 m) long when measured between the curbs at Park Row in Manhattan and Sands Street in Brooklyn. A separate measurement of 5,989 feet (1,825 m) is sometimes given; this is the distance from the curb at Centre Street in Manhattan.

==== Suspension span ====
The main span between the two suspension towers is 1,595.5 feet (486.3 m) long and 85 feet (26 m) wide. The bridge "elongates and contracts between the extremes of temperature from 14 to 16 inches". Navigational clearance is 127 ft (38.7 m) above mean high water (MHW). A 1909 Engineering Magazine article said that, at the center of the span, the height above MHW could fluctuate by more than 9 feet (2.7 m) due to temperature and traffic loads, while more rigid spans had a lower maximum deflection.

The side spans, between each suspension tower and each side's suspension anchorages, are 930 feet (280 m) long. At the time of construction, engineers had not yet discovered the aerodynamics of bridge construction, and bridge designs were not tested in wind tunnels. John Roebling designed the Brooklyn Bridge's truss system to be six to eight times as strong as he thought it needed to be. As such, the open truss structure supporting the deck is, by its nature, subject to fewer aerodynamic problems. However, due to a supplier's fraudulent substitution of inferior-quality wire in the initial construction, the bridge was reappraised at the time as being only four times as strong as necessary.

The main span and side spans are supported by a structure containing trusses that run parallel to the roadway, each of which is 33 feet (10 m) deep. Originally there were six trusses, but two were removed during a late-1940s renovation. The trusses allow the Brooklyn Bridge to hold a total load of 18,700 short tons (17,000 metric tons), a design consideration from when it originally carried heavier elevated trains. These trusses are held up by suspender ropes, which hang downward from each of the four main cables. Crossbeams run between the trusses at the top, and diagonal and vertical stiffening beams run on the outside and inside of each roadway.

An elevated pedestrian-only promenade runs in between the two roadways and 18 feet (5.5 m) above them. It typically runs 4 feet (1.2 m) below the level of the crossbeams, except at the areas surrounding each tower. Here, the promenade rises to just above the level of the crossbeams, connecting to a balcony that slightly overhangs the two roadways. The path is generally 10 to 17 feet (3.0 to 5.2 m) wide. The iron railings were produced by Janes & Kirtland, a Bronx iron foundry that also made the United States Capitol dome and the Bow Bridge in Central Park.

==== Approaches ====
Each of the side spans is reached by an approach ramp. The 971-foot (296 m) approach ramp from the Brooklyn side is shorter than the 1,567-foot (478 m) approach ramp from the Manhattan side. The approaches are supported by Renaissance-style arches made of masonry; the arch openings themselves were filled with brick walls, with small windows within. The approach ramp contains nine arch or iron-girder bridges across side streets in Manhattan and Brooklyn.

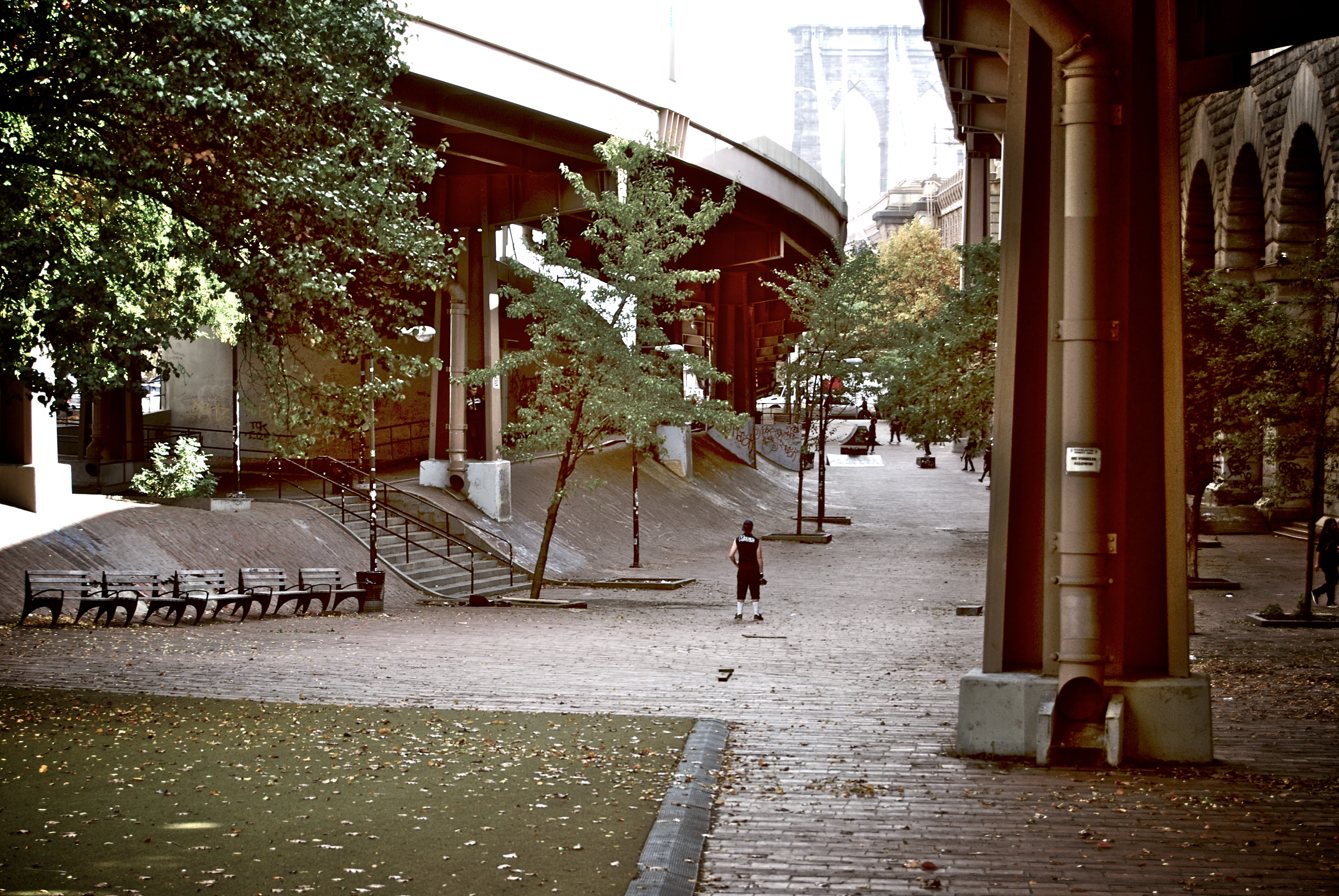
Brooklyn Banks skate park, seen in 2009

Underneath the Manhattan approach, a series of brick slopes or "banks" was developed into a skate park, the Brooklyn Banks, in the late 1980s. The park uses the approach's support pillars as obstacles. In the mid-2010s, the Brooklyn Banks were closed to the public because the area was being used as a storage site during the bridge's renovation. The skateboarding community has attempted to save the banks on multiple occasions; after the city destroyed the smaller banks in the 2000s, the city government agreed to keep the larger banks for skateboarding. When the NYCDOT removed the bricks from the banks in 2020, skateboarders started an online petition. In the 2020s, local resident Rosa Chang advocated for the 9-acre (3.6 ha) space under the Manhattan approach to be converted into a recreational area known as Gotham Park. Some of the space under the Manhattan approach reopened in May 2023 as a park called the Arches; this was followed in November 2024 by another 15,000-square-foot (1,400 m^{2}) section of parkland.

=== Cables ===
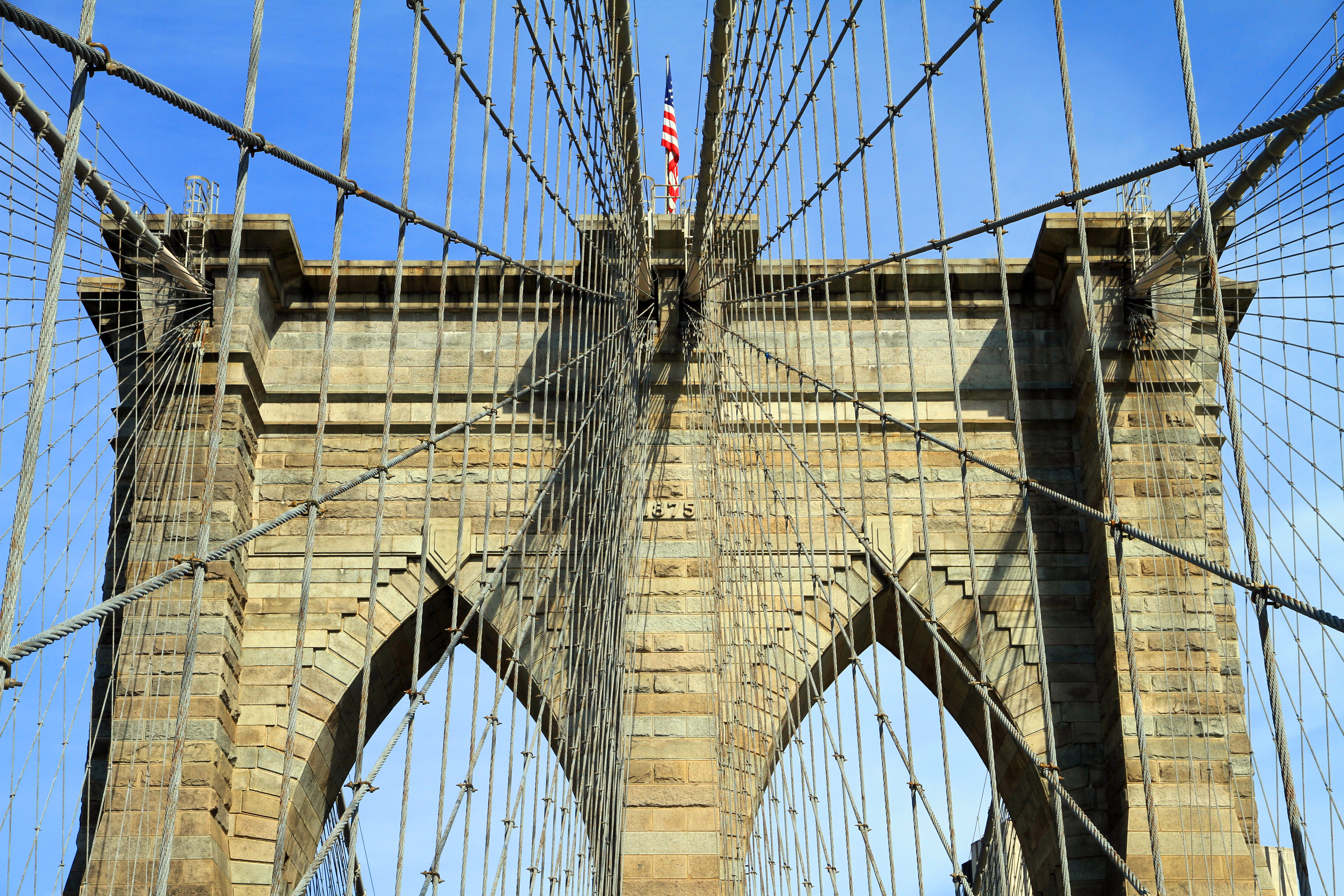
View of diagonal stays and vertical suspender cables; the main cables are at top

The Brooklyn Bridge contains four main cables, which descend from the tops of the suspension towers and support the deck. Two are located to the outside of the bridge's roadways, while two are in the median of the roadways. Each main cable measures 15.75 inches (40.0 cm) in diameter and contains 5,282 parallel, galvanized steel wires wrapped closely together in a cylindrical shape. These wires are bundled in 19 individual strands, with 278 wires to a strand. This was the first use of bundling in a suspension bridge and took several months for workers to tie together. Since the 2000s, the main cables have also supported a series of 24-watt LED lighting fixtures, referred to as "necklace lights" due to their shape.

In addition, either 1,088, 1,096, or 1,520 galvanized steel wire suspender cables hang downward from the main cables. Another 400 cable stays extend diagonally from the towers. The vertical suspender cables and diagonal cable stays hold up the truss structure around the bridge deck. The bridge's suspenders originally used wire rope, which was replaced in the 1980s with galvanized steel made by Bethlehem Steel. The vertical suspender cables measure 8 to 130 feet (2.4 to 39.6 m) long, and the diagonal stays measure 138 to 449 feet (42 to 137 m) long.

==== Anchorages ====
Each side of the bridge contains an anchorage for the main cables. The anchorages are trapezoidal limestone structures located slightly inland of the shore, measuring 129 by 119 feet (39 by 36 m) at the base and 117 by 104 feet (36 by 32 m) at the top. Each anchorage weighs 60,000 short tons (54,000 long tons; 54,000 t). The Manhattan anchorage rests on a foundation of bedrock while the Brooklyn anchorage rests on clay.

The anchorages both have four anchor plates, one for each of the main cables, which are located near ground level and parallel to the ground. The anchor plates measure 16 by 17.5 feet (4.9 by 5.3 m), with a thickness of 2.5 feet (0.76 m) and weigh 46,000 pounds (21,000 kg) each. Each anchor plate is connected to the respective main cable by two sets of nine eyebars, each of which is about 12.5 feet (3.8 m) long and up to 9 by 3 inches (229 by 76 mm) thick. The chains of eyebars curve downward from the cables toward the anchor plates, and the eyebars vary in size depending on their position. (Note: The largest eyebars, which carry more stress, are located furthest away from the anchor plates. The eyebars closer to the anchor plates are progressively smaller.)

The anchorages also contain numerous passageways and compartments. Starting in 1876, in order to fund the bridge's maintenance, the New York City government made the large vaults under the bridge's Manhattan anchorage available for rent, and they were in constant use during the early 20th century. The vaults were used to store wine, as they were kept at a consistent 60 °F (16 °C) temperature due to a lack of air circulation. The Manhattan vault was called the "Blue Grotto" because of a shrine to the Virgin Mary next to an opening at the entrance. The vaults were closed for public use in the late 1910s and 1920s during World War I and Prohibition but were reopened thereafter. When New York magazine visited one of the cellars in 1978, it discovered a "fading inscription" on a wall reading: "Who loveth not wine, women and song, he remaineth a fool his whole life long." Leaks found within the vault's spaces necessitated repairs during the late 1980s and early 1990s. By the late 1990s, the chambers were being used to store maintenance equipment.

=== Towers ===
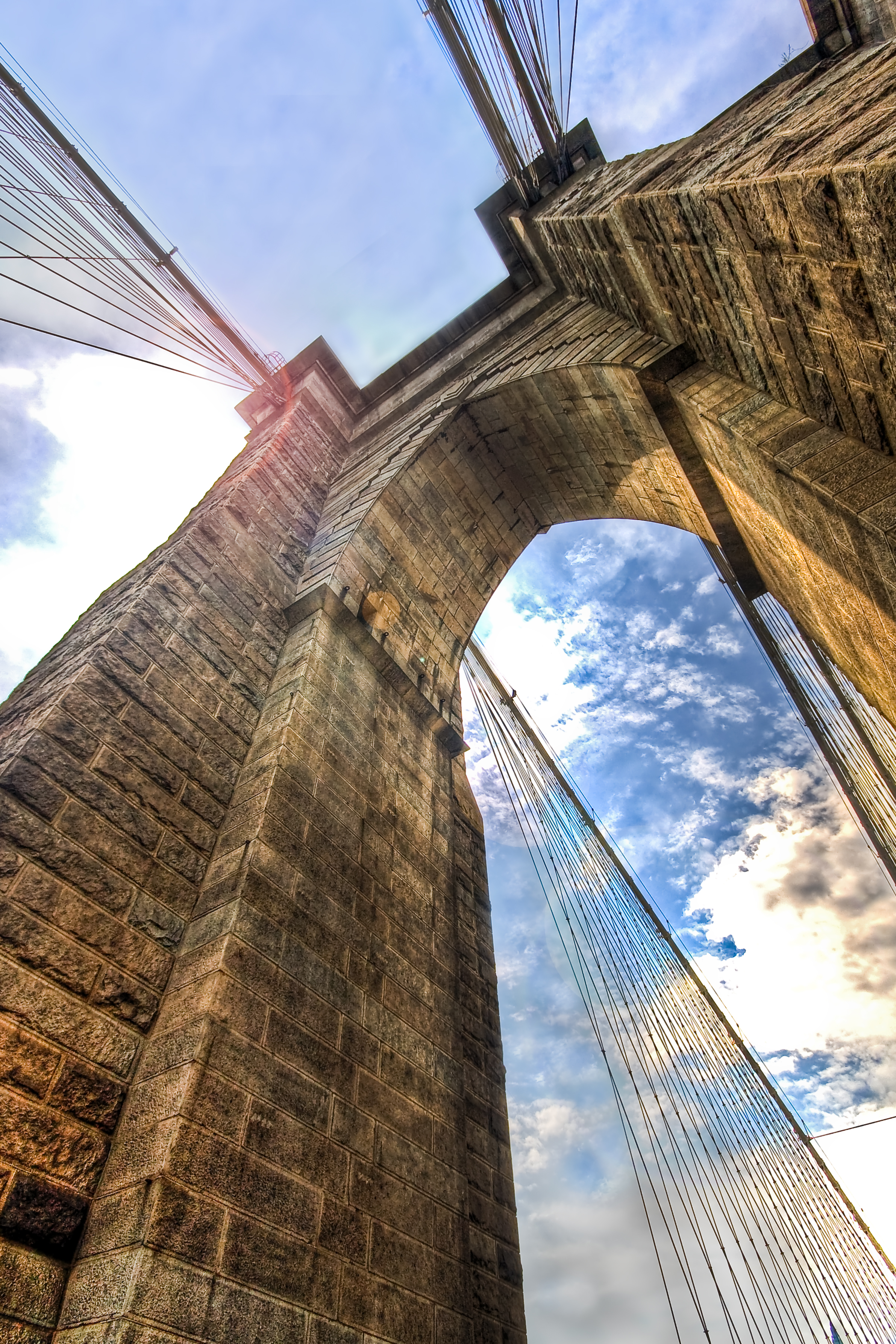
Characteristic pointed arches of the bridge's Gothic Revival suspension towers

The bridge's two suspension towers are 278 feet (85 m) tall with a footprint of 140 by 59 feet (43 by 18 m) at the high water line. They are built of limestone, granite, and Rosendale cement. The limestone was quarried at the Clark Quarry in Essex County, New York. The granite blocks were quarried and shaped on Vinalhaven Island, Maine, under a contract with the Bodwell Granite Company, and delivered from Maine to New York by schooner. The Manhattan tower contains 46,945 cubic yards (35,892 m^{3}) of masonry, while the Brooklyn tower has 38,214 cubic yards (29,217 m^{3}) of masonry. There are 56 LED lamps mounted onto the towers.

Each tower contains a pair of Gothic Revival pointed arches, through which the roadways run. The arch openings are 117 feet (36 m) tall and 33.75 feet (10.29 m) wide. The tops of the towers are located 159 feet (48 m) above the floor of each arch opening, while the floors of the openings are 119.25 feet (36.35 m) above mean water level, giving the towers a total height of 278.25 feet (84.81 m) above mean high water.

==== Caissons ====
The towers rest on underwater caissons made of southern yellow pine and filled with cement. Inside both caissons were spaces for construction workers. The Manhattan side's caisson is slightly larger, measuring 172 by 102 feet (52 by 31 m) and located 78.5 feet (23.9 m) below high water, while the Brooklyn side's caisson measures 168 by 102 feet (51 by 31 m) and is located 44.5 feet (13.6 m) below high water. The caissons were designed to hold at least the weight of the towers which would exert a pressure of 5 short tons per square foot (49 t/m^{2}) when fully built, but the caissons were over-engineered for safety. During an accident on the Brooklyn side, when air pressure was lost and the partially-built towers dropped full-force down, the caisson sustained an estimated pressure of 23 short tons per square foot (220 t/m^{2}) with only minor damage. Most of the timber used in the bridge's construction, including in the caissons, came from mills at Gascoigne Bluff on St. Simons Island, Georgia.

The Brooklyn side's caisson, which was built first, originally had a height of 9.5 feet (2.9 m) and a ceiling composed of five layers of timber, each layer 1 foot (0.30 m) tall. Ten more layers of timber were later added atop the ceiling, and the entire caisson was wrapped in tin and wood for further protection against flooding. The thickness of the caisson's sides was 8 feet (2.4 m) at both the bottom and the top. The caisson had six chambers: two each for dredging, supply shafts, and airlocks.

The caisson on the Manhattan side was slightly different because it had to be installed at a greater depth. To protect against the increased air pressure at that depth, the Manhattan caisson had 22 layers of timber on its roof, seven more than its Brooklyn counterpart had. The Manhattan caisson also had fifty 4-inch-diameter (10 cm) pipes for sand removal, a fireproof iron-boilerplate interior, and different airlocks and communication systems.

== History ==
=== Planning ===
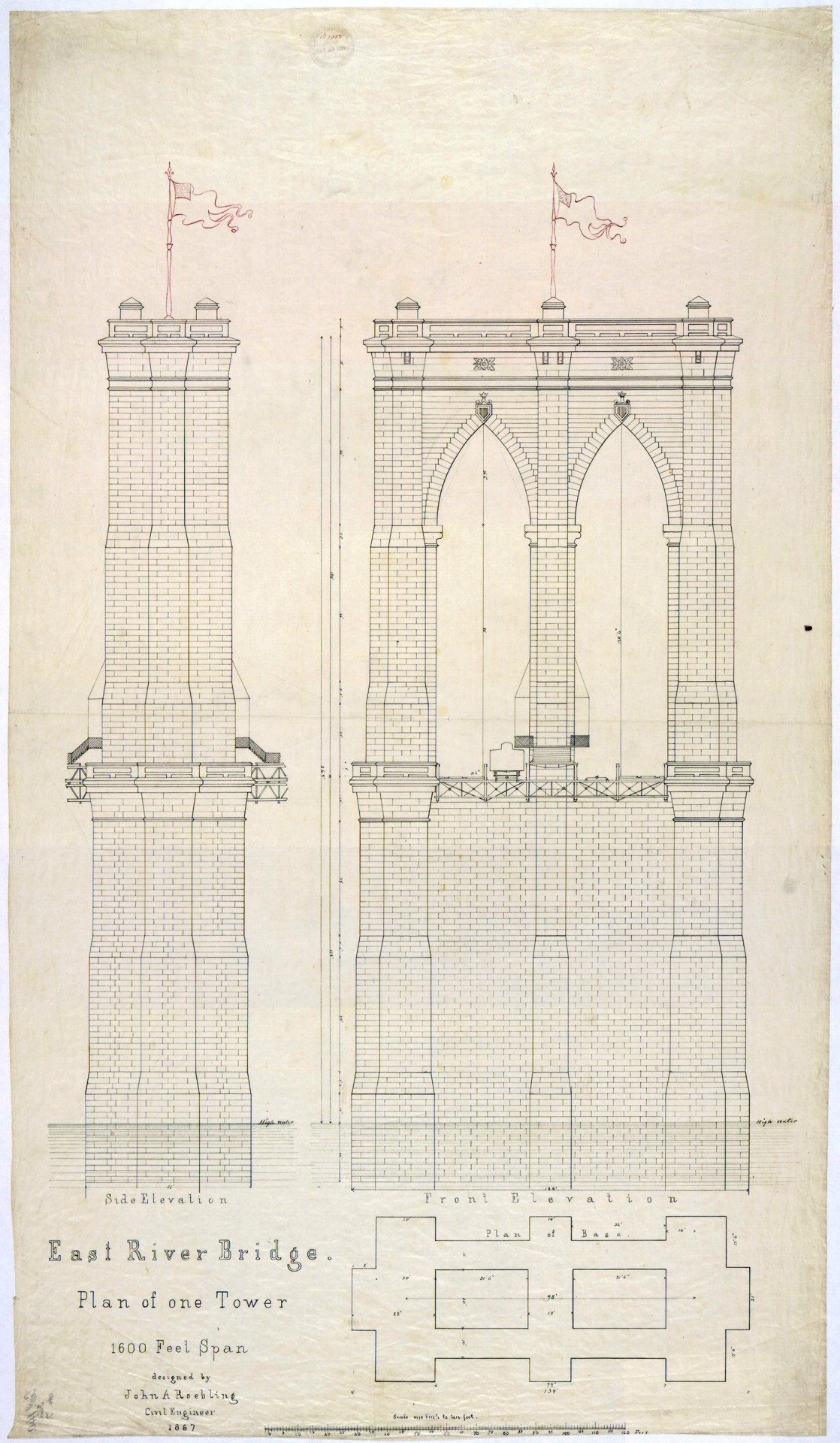
Early Brooklyn Bridge tower plan, 1867

Proposals for a bridge between the then-separate cities of Brooklyn and New York had been suggested as early as 1800. At the time, the only travel between the two cities was by a number of ferry lines. Engineers presented various designs, such as chain or link bridges, though these were never built because of the difficulties of constructing a high enough fixed-span bridge across the extremely busy East River. There were also proposals for tunnels under the East River, but these were considered prohibitively expensive. Renewed interest in connecting the two cities emerged after the construction of the Aqueduct Bridge, connecting Manhattan to what is now the West Bronx, in the 1840s. German immigrant engineer John Augustus Roebling proposed building a suspension bridge over the East River in 1857. He had previously designed and constructed shorter suspension bridges, such as Roebling's Delaware Aqueduct in Lackawaxen, Pennsylvania, and the Niagara Suspension Bridge. In 1867, Roebling erected what became the John A. Roebling Suspension Bridge over the Ohio River between Cincinnati, Ohio, and Covington, Kentucky.

In February 1867, the New York State Senate passed a bill that allowed the construction of a suspension bridge from Brooklyn to Manhattan. Two months later, the New York and Brooklyn Bridge Company was incorporated with a board of directors (later converted to a board of trustees). There were twenty trustees in total: eight each appointed by the mayors of New York and Brooklyn, as well as the mayors of each city and the auditor and comptroller of Brooklyn. The company was tasked with constructing what was then known as the New York and Brooklyn Bridge. Alternatively, the span was just referred to as the "Brooklyn Bridge", a name originating in a January 25, 1867, letter to the editor sent to the Brooklyn Daily Eagle. The act of incorporation, which became law on April 16, 1867, authorized the cities of New York (now Manhattan) and Brooklyn to subscribe to $5 million in capital stock, which would fund the bridge's construction.

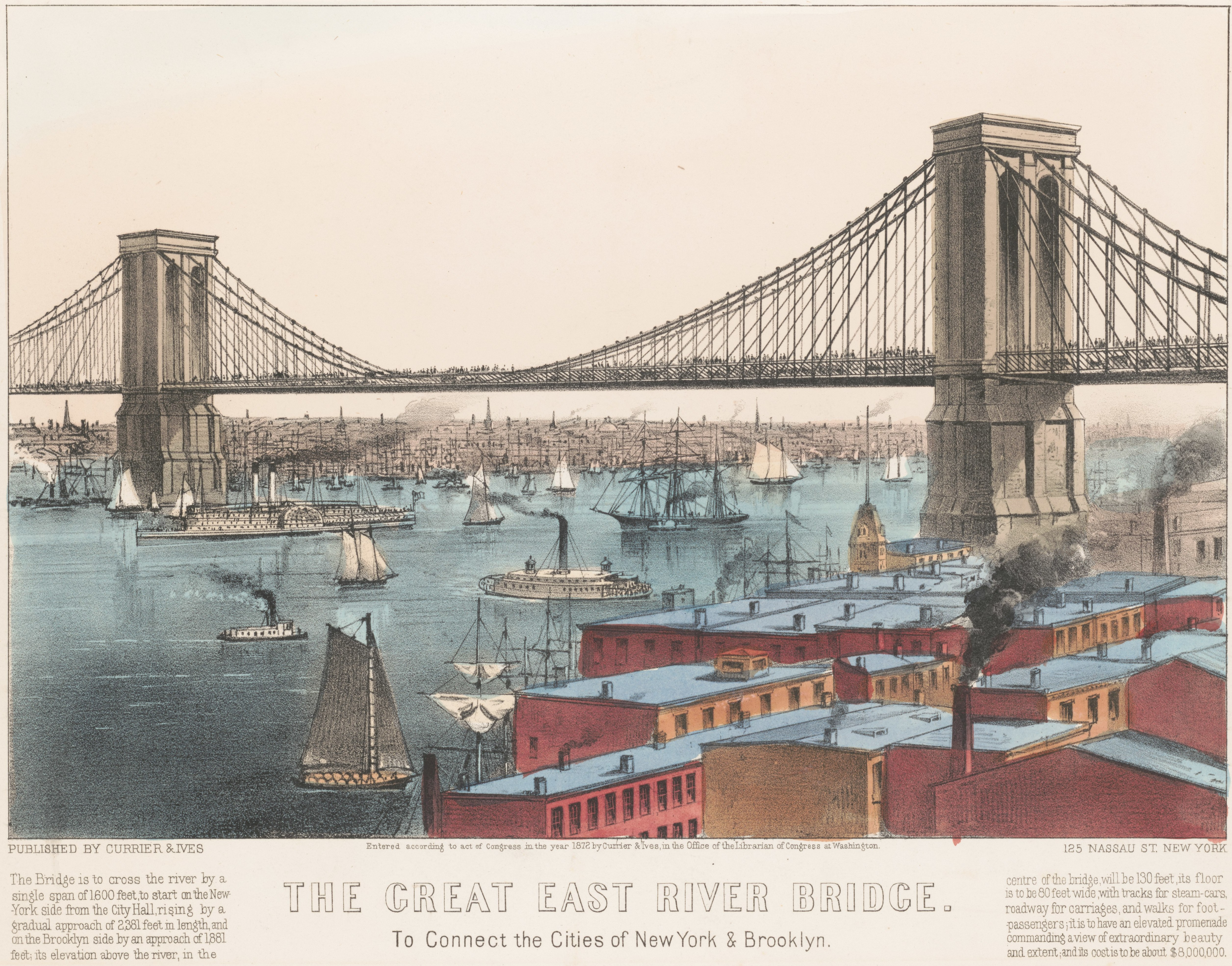
Artists' conception, by Currier and Ives, of the bridge while construction was underway, 1872

Roebling was subsequently named the chief engineer of the work and, by September 1867, had presented a master plan. According to the plan, the bridge would be longer and taller than any suspension bridge previously built. It would incorporate roadways and elevated rail tracks, whose tolls and fares would provide the means to pay for the bridge's construction. It would also include a raised promenade that served as a leisurely pathway. The proposal received much acclaim in both cities, and residents predicted that the New York and Brooklyn Bridge's opening would have as much of an impact as the Suez Canal, the first transatlantic telegraph cable or the first transcontinental railroad. By early 1869, however, some individuals started to criticize the project, saying either that the bridge was too expensive, or that the construction process was too difficult.

To allay concerns about the design of the New York and Brooklyn Bridge, Roebling set up a "Bridge Party" in March 1869, where he invited engineers and members of U.S. Congress to see his other spans. Following the bridge party in April, Roebling and several engineers conducted final surveys. During the process, it was determined that the main span would have to be raised from 130 to 135 feet (40 to 41 m) above MHW, requiring several changes to the overall design. In June 1869, while conducting these surveys, Roebling sustained a crush injury to his foot when a ferry pinned it against a piling. After amputation of his crushed toes, he developed a tetanus infection that left him incapacitated and resulted in his death the following month. Washington Roebling, John Roebling's 32-year-old son, was then hired to fill his father's role. Tammany Hall leader William M. Tweed also became involved in the bridge's construction because, as a major landowner in New York City, he had an interest in the project's completion. The New York and Brooklyn Bridge Company—later known simply as the New York Bridge Company—was actually overseen by Tammany Hall, and it approved Roebling's plans and designated him as chief engineer of the project.

=== Construction ===
==== Caissons ====
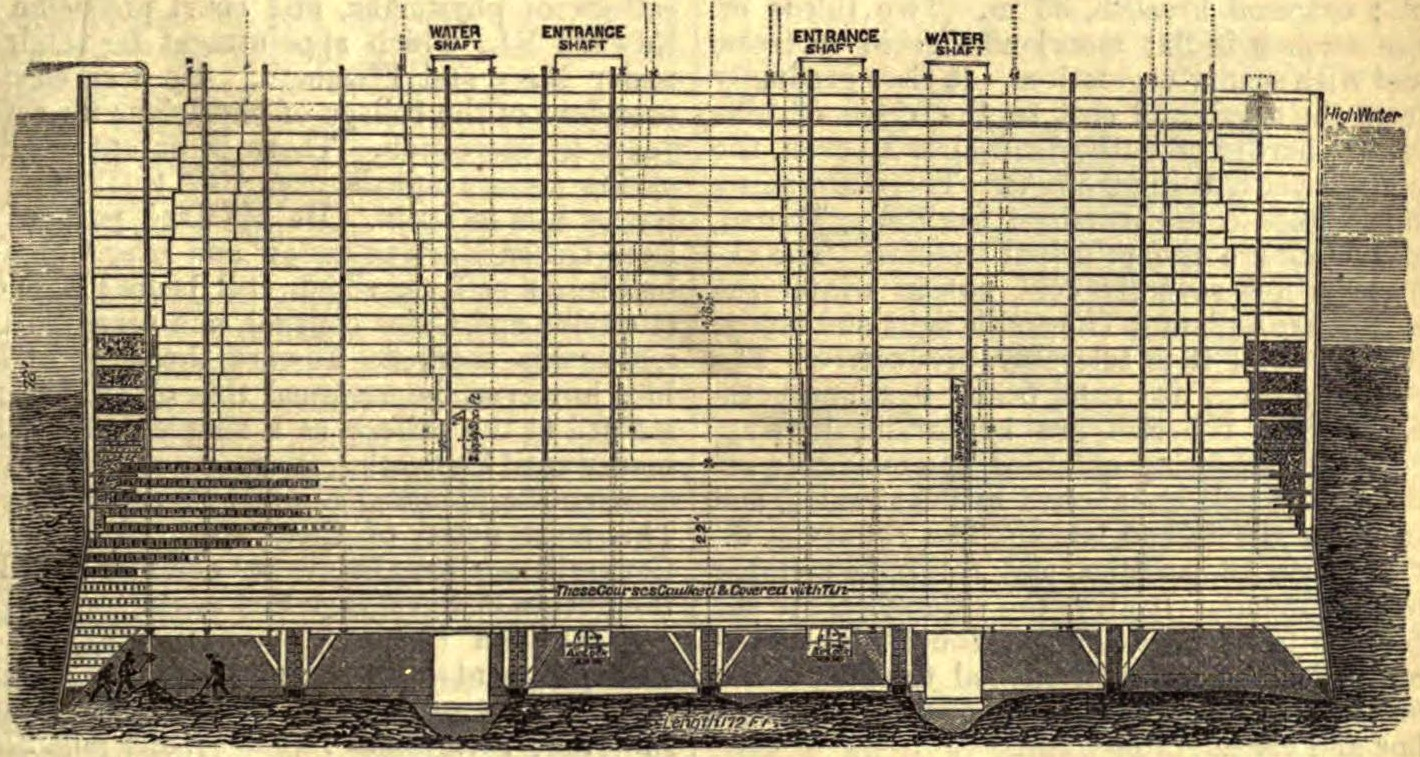
Diagram of the caisson

Construction of the Brooklyn Bridge began on January 2, 1870. The first work entailed the construction of two caissons, upon which the suspension towers would be built. The Brooklyn side's caisson was built at the Webb & Bell shipyard in Greenpoint, Brooklyn, and was launched into the river on March 19, 1870. Compressed air was pumped into the caisson, and workers entered the space to dig the sediment until it sank to the bedrock. As one sixteen-year-old from Ireland, Frank Harris, described the fearful experience:

The six of us were working naked to the waist in the small iron chamber with the temperature of about 80 degrees Fahrenheit: In five minutes the sweat was pouring from us, and all the while we were standing in icy water that was only kept from rising by the terrific pressure. No wonder the headaches were blinding.

Once the caisson had reached the desired depth, it was to be filled in with vertical brick piers and concrete. However, due to the unexpectedly high concentration of large boulders atop the riverbed, the Brooklyn caisson took several months to sink to the desired depth. Furthermore, in December 1870, its timber roof caught fire, delaying construction further. The "Great Blowout", as the fire was called, delayed construction for several months, since the holes in the caisson had to be repaired. On March 6, 1871, the repairs were finished, and the caisson had reached its final depth of 44.5 feet (13.6 m); it was filled with concrete five days later. Overall, about 264 individuals were estimated to have worked in the caisson every day, but because of high worker turnover, the final total was thought to be about 2,500 men in total. Some workers were paralyzed by decompression sickness; at its final depth, the caisson's air pressure was 21 pounds per square inch (140 kPa).

The Manhattan side's caisson was the next structure to be built. To ensure that it would not catch fire like its counterpart had, the Manhattan caisson was lined with fireproof plate iron. It was launched from Webb & Bell's shipyard on May 11, 1871, and maneuvered into place that September. Due to the extreme underwater air pressure inside the much deeper Manhattan caisson, many workers became sick with "the bends"—decompression sickness—during this work, despite the incorporation of airlocks (which were believed to help with decompression sickness at the time). This condition was unknown at the time and was first called "caisson disease" by the project physician, Andrew Smith. Between January 25 and May 31, 1872, Smith treated 110 cases of decompression sickness, while three workers died from the disease. When iron probes underneath the Manhattan caisson found the bedrock to be even deeper than expected, Washington Roebling halted construction due to the increased risk of decompression sickness. After the Manhattan caisson reached a depth of 78.5 feet (23.9 m) with an air pressure of 35 pounds per square inch (240 kPa), Washington deemed the sandy subsoil overlying the bedrock 30 feet (9.1 m) beneath to be sufficiently firm, and subsequently infilled the caisson with concrete in July 1872.

Washington Roebling himself suffered a paralyzing injury as a result of caisson disease shortly after ground was broken for the Brooklyn tower foundation. His debilitating condition left him unable to supervise the construction in person, so he designed the caissons and other equipment from his apartment, directing "the completion of the bridge through a telescope from his bedroom." His wife, Emily Warren Roebling, not only provided written communications between her husband and the engineers on site, but also understood mathematics, calculations of catenary curves, strengths of materials, bridge specifications, and the intricacies of cable construction. She spent the next 11 years helping supervise the bridge's construction, performing much of the chief engineer's duties, including day-to-day supervision and project management.

==== Towers ====
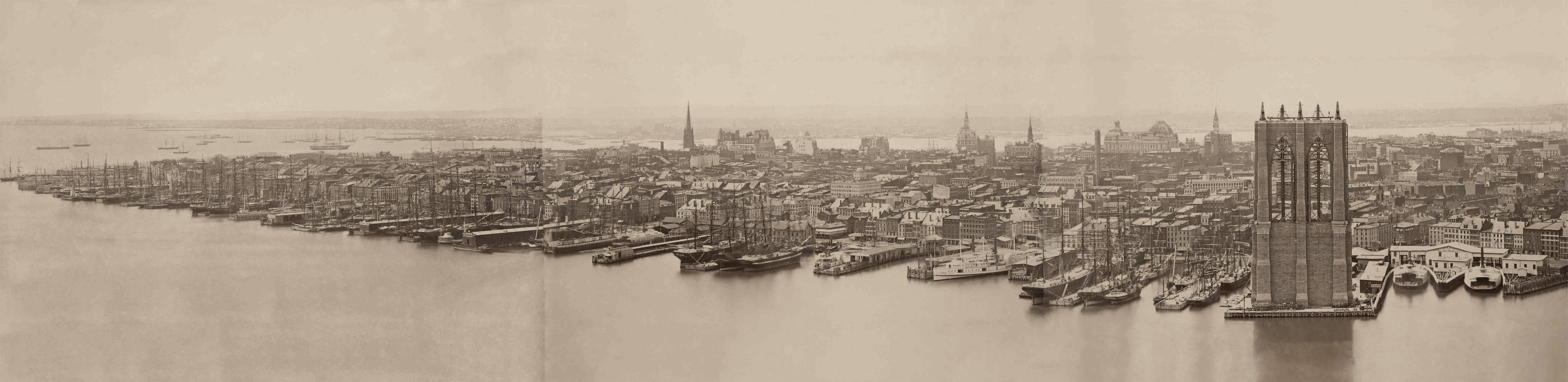
View of Manhattan in 1876, showing the Brooklyn Bridge under construction

After the caissons were completed, piers were constructed on top of each of them upon which masonry towers would be built. The towers' construction was a complex process that took four years. Since the masonry blocks were heavy, the builders transported them to the base of the towers using a pulley system with a continuous 1.5-inch-diameter (3.8 cm) steel wire rope, operated by steam engines at ground level. The blocks were then carried up on a timber track alongside each tower and maneuvered into the proper position using a derrick atop the towers. The blocks sometimes vibrated the ropes because of their weight, but only once did a block fall.

Construction on the suspension towers started in mid-1872, and by the time work was halted for the winter in late 1872, parts of each tower had already been built. By mid-1873, there was substantial progress on the towers' construction. The Brooklyn side's tower had reached a height of 164 feet (50 m) above mean high water (MHW), while the tower on the Manhattan side had reached 88 feet (27 m) above MHW. The arches of the Brooklyn tower were completed by August 1874. The tower was substantially finished by December 1874 with the erection of saddle plates for the main cables at the top of the tower. However, the ornamentation on the Brooklyn tower could not be completed until the Manhattan tower was finished. The last stone on the Brooklyn tower was raised in June 1875 and the Manhattan tower was completed in July 1876. The saddle plates atop both towers were also raised in July 1876. The work was dangerous: by 1876, three workers had died having fallen from the towers, while nine other workers were killed in other accidents.

When the towers were completed, they were taller than any building in the city, with the exception of the spire of Trinity Church, which reached 279 feet (85 m). This remained the case until 1890.

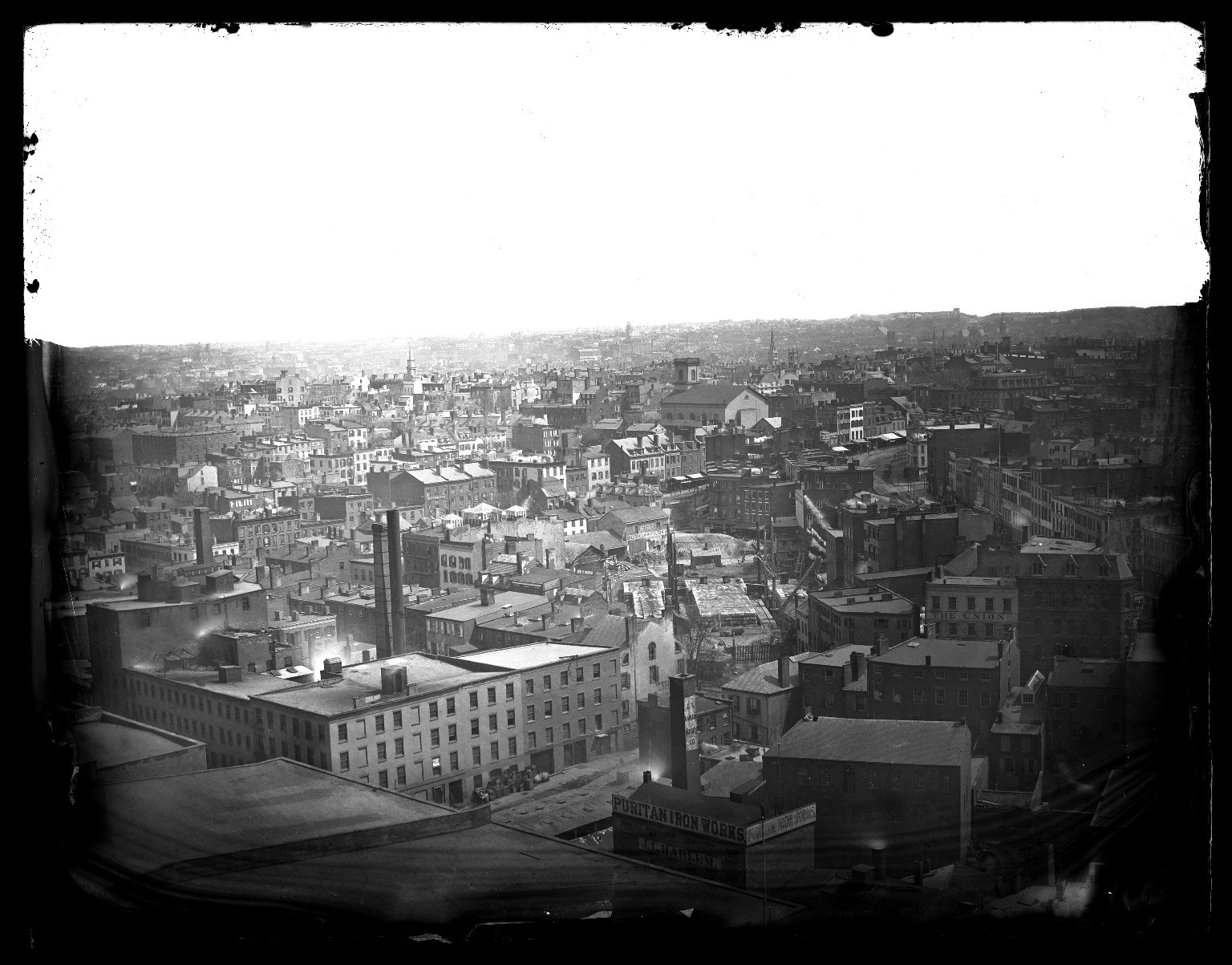
George Bradford Brainerd, From Bridge Tower, c. 1872, Brooklyn Museum

In 1875, while the towers were being constructed, the project had depleted its original $5 million budget. Two bridge commissioners, one each from Brooklyn and Manhattan, petitioned New York state lawmakers to allot another $8 million for construction. Ultimately, the legislators passed a law authorizing the allotment with the condition that the cities would buy the stock of Brooklyn Bridge's private stockholders.

Work proceeded concurrently on the anchorages on each side. The Brooklyn anchorage broke ground in January 1873 and was subsequently substantially completed in August 1875. The Manhattan anchorage was built in less time, having started in May 1875, it was mostly completed in July 1876. The anchorages could not be fully completed until the main cables were spun, at which point another 6 feet (1.8 m) would be added to the height of each 80-foot (24 m) anchorage.

==== Cables ====
The first temporary wire was stretched between the towers on August 15, 1876, using chrome steel provided by the Chrome Steel Company of Brooklyn. The wire was then stretched back across the river, and the two ends were spliced to form a traveler, a lengthy loop of wire connecting the towers, which was driven by a 30 horsepower (22 kW) steam hoisting engine at ground level. The wire was one of two that were used to create a temporary footbridge for workers while cable spinning was ongoing. The next step was to send an engineer across the completed traveler wire in a boatswain's chair slung from the wire, to show the workforce it was safe enough. The bridge's master mechanic, E. F. Farrington, was selected for this task, and an estimated crowd of 10,000 people on both shores watched him cross. A second traveler wire was then stretched across the span, a task that was completed by August 30. The temporary footbridge, located some 60 feet (18 m) above the elevation of the future deck, was completed in February 1877.

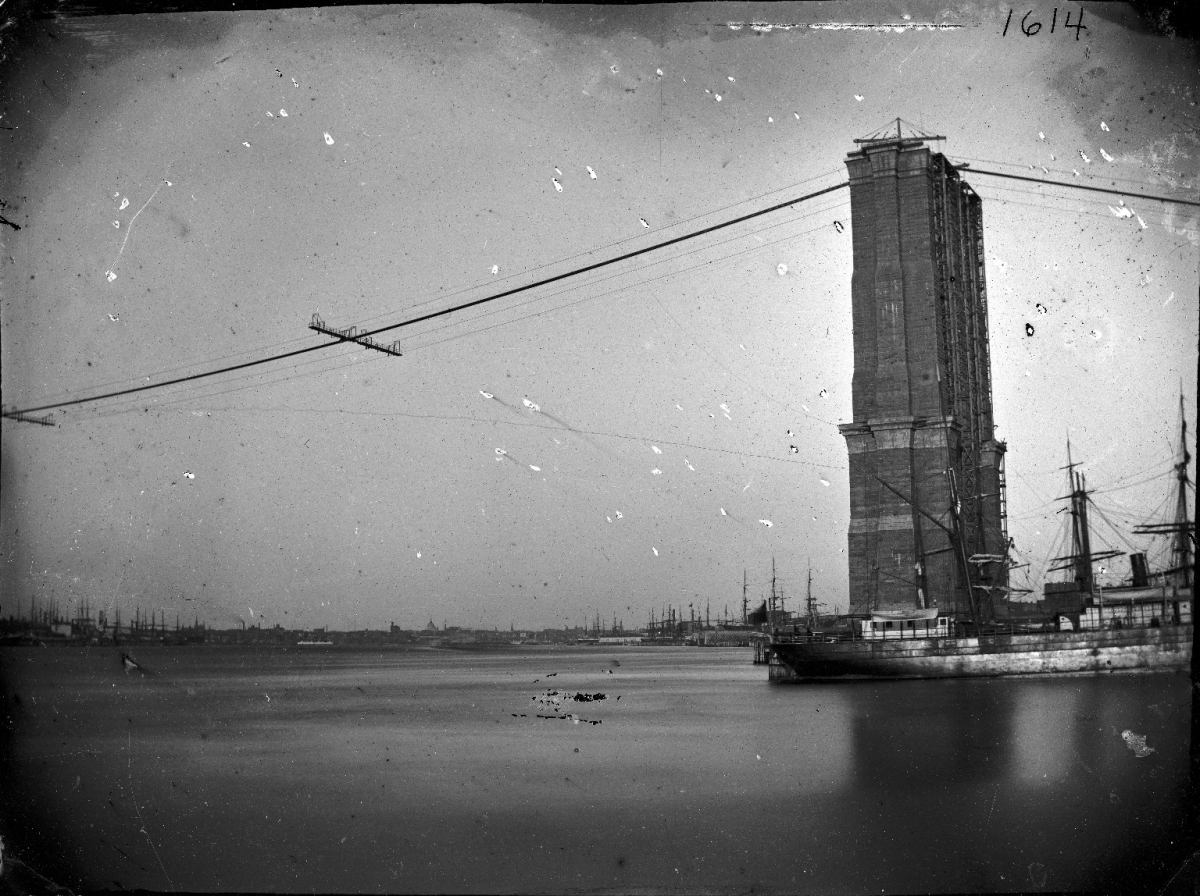
Under construction, c. 1872 – c. 1877

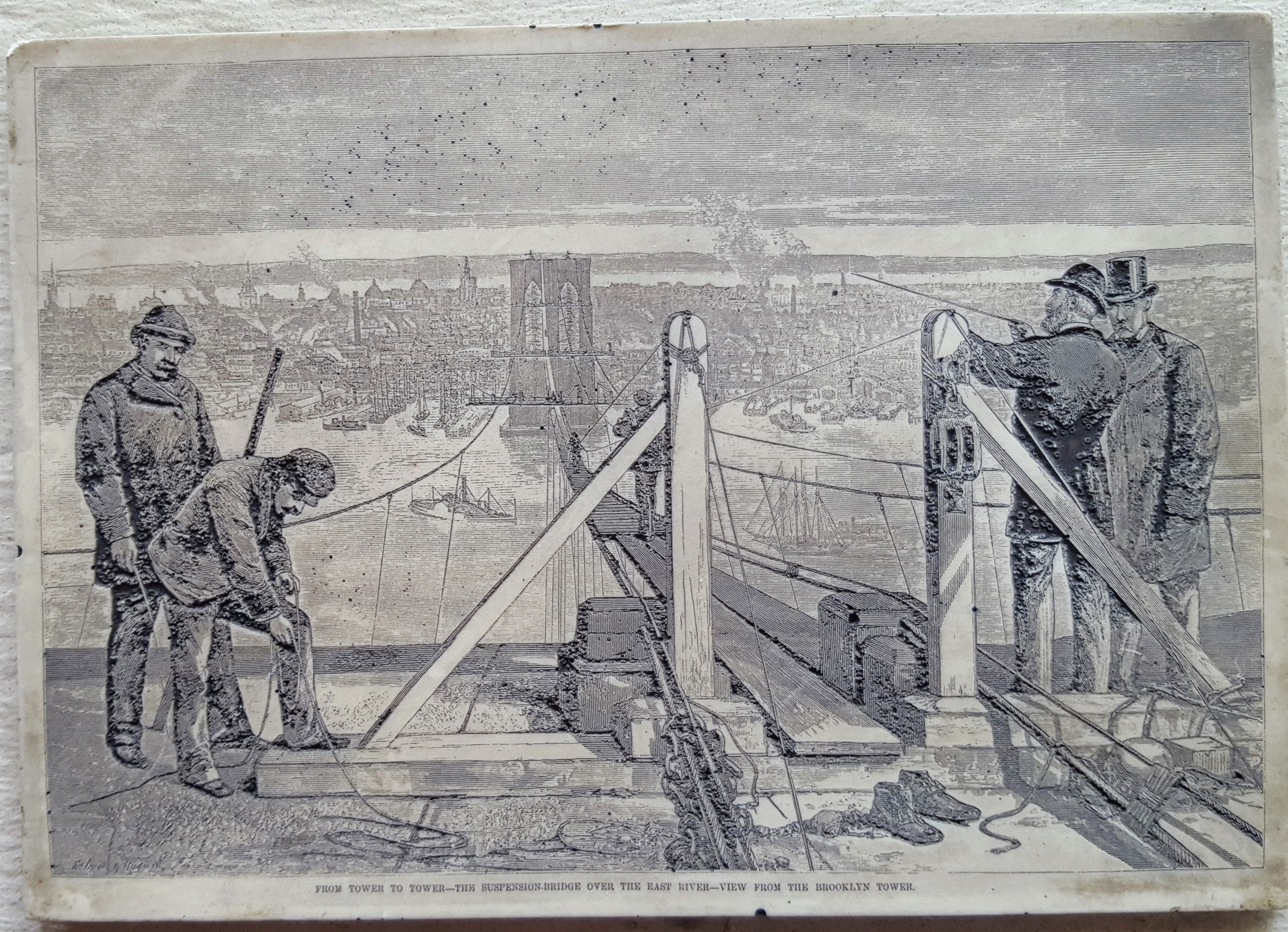
"From Tower to Tower—the suspension bridge over the East River—view from the Brooklyn Tower" (1877)

By December 1876, a steel contract for the permanent cables still had not been awarded. There was disagreement over whether the bridge's cables should use the as-yet-untested Bessemer steel or the well-proven crucible steel. Until a permanent contract was awarded, the builders ordered 30 short tons (27 long tons) of wire in the interim, 10 tons each from three companies, including Washington Roebling's own steel mill in Trenton, New Jersey. In the end, it was decided to use number 8 Birmingham gauge (approximately 4 mm or 0.165 inches in diameter) crucible steel, and a request for bids was distributed, to which eight companies responded. In January 1877, a contract for crucible steel was awarded to J. Lloyd Haigh, who was associated with bridge trustee Abram Hewitt, whom Roebling distrusted.

The spinning of the wires required the manufacture of large coils of it which were galvanized but not oiled when they left the factory. The coils were delivered to a yard near the Brooklyn anchorage. There they were dipped in linseed oil, hoisted to the top of the anchorage, dried out and spliced into a single wire, and finally coated with red zinc for further galvanizing. There were thirty-two drums at the anchorage yard, eight for each of the four main cables. Each drum had a capacity of 60,000 feet (18,000 m) of wire. The first experimental wire for the main cables was stretched between the towers on May 29, 1877, and spinning began two weeks later. All four main cables were being strung by that July. During that time, the temporary footbridge was unofficially opened to members of the public, who could receive a visitor's pass; by August 1877 several thousand visitors from around the world had used the footbridge. The visitor passes ceased that September after a visitor had an epileptic seizure and nearly fell off.

As the wires were being spun, work also commenced on the demolition of buildings on either side of the river for the Brooklyn Bridge's approaches; this work was mostly complete by September 1877. The following month, initial contracts were awarded for the suspender wires, which would hang down from the main cables and support the deck. By May 1878, the main cables were more than two-thirds complete. However, the following month, one of the wires slipped, killing two people and injuring three others. In 1877, Hewitt wrote a letter urging against the use of Bessemer steel in the bridge's construction. Bids had been submitted for both crucible steel and Bessemer steel; John A. Roebling's Sons submitted the lowest bid for Bessemer steel, but at Hewitt's direction, the contract was awarded to Haigh.

A subsequent wire sampling by Roebling's assistant engineers discovered that Haigh had substituted inferior quality wire in the cables. Of eighty rings of wire that were tested, only five met standards, and it was estimated that Haigh had earned $300,000 from the deception. At this point, it was too late to replace the cables that had already been constructed. Roebling determined that the poorer wire would leave the bridge only four times as strong as necessary, rather than six to eight times as strong. The inferior-quality wire was allowed to remain and 150 extra wires were added to each cable. To avoid public controversy, Haigh was not fired, but instead was required to personally pay for the extra higher-quality wire needed. (Note: By 1880, Haigh was incarcerated in Sing Sing prison for an unrelated crime.) The contract for the remaining wire was awarded to the John A. Roebling's Sons, and by October 5, 1878, the last of the main cables' wires went over the river.

==== Nearing completion ====
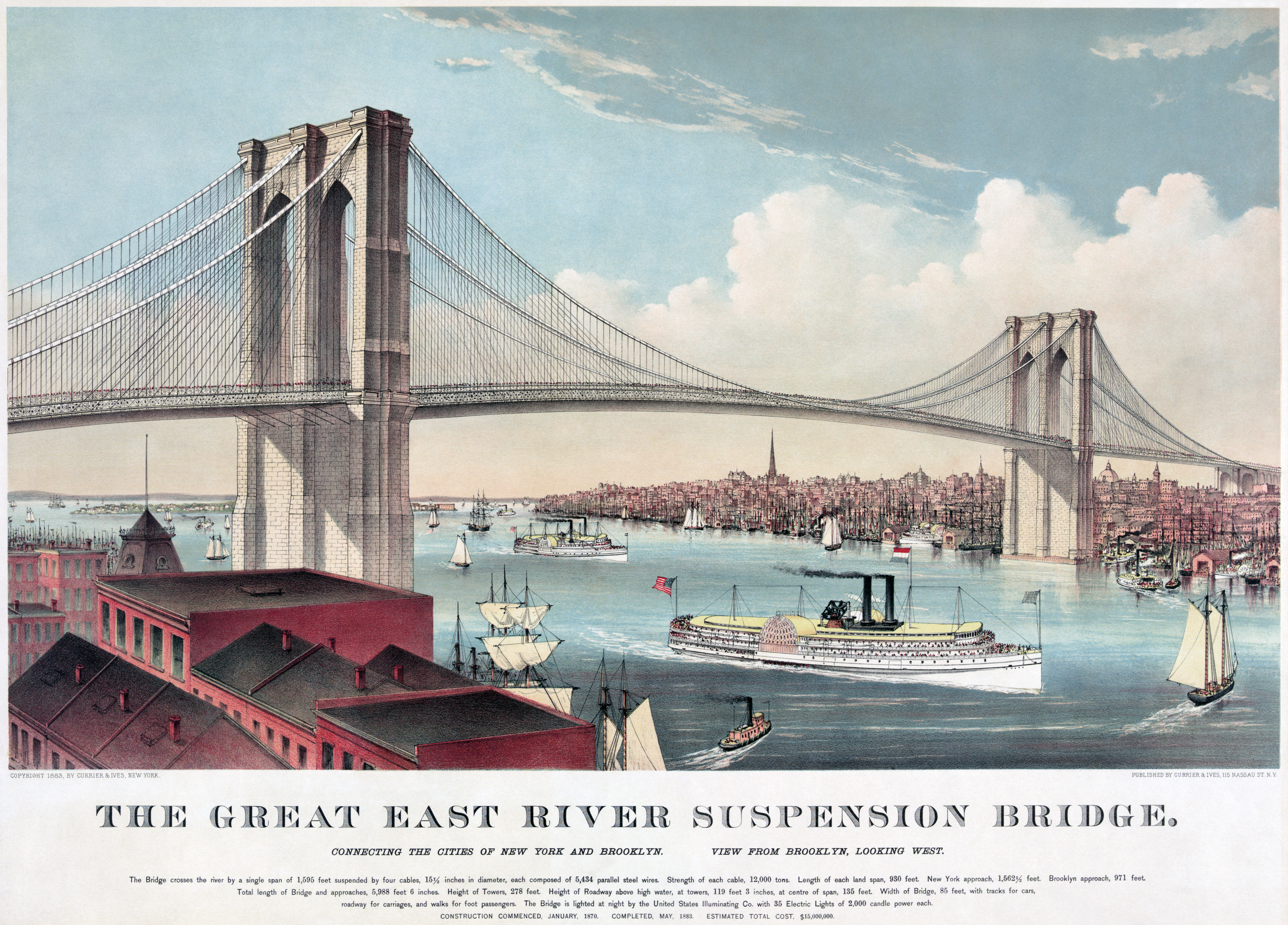
Chromolithograph of the "Great East River Suspension Bridge" by Currier and Ives, created in 1883.

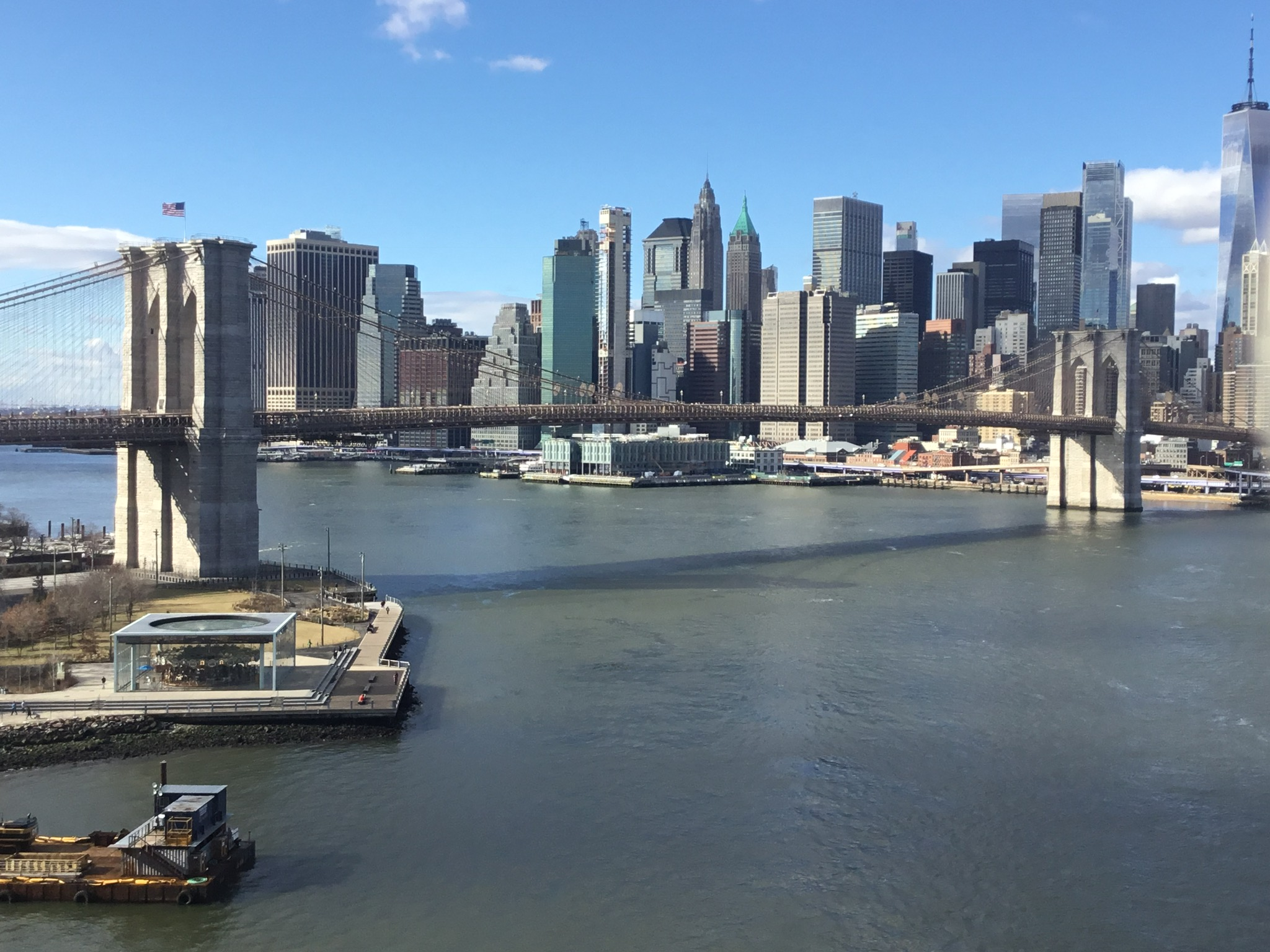
Similar view, 2023

After the suspender wires had been placed, workers began erecting steel crossbeams to support the roadway as part of the bridge's overall superstructure. Construction on the bridge's superstructure started in March 1879, but, as with the cables, the trustees initially disagreed on whether the steel superstructure should be made of Bessemer or crucible steel. That July, the trustees decided to award a contract for 500 short tons (450 long tons) of Bessemer steel to the Edgemoor (or Edge Moor) Iron Works, based in Philadelphia, to be delivered by 1880. The trustees later passed another resolution for another 500 short tons (450 long tons) of Bessemer steel. However, by February 1880 the steel deliveries had not started. That October, the bridge trustees questioned Edgemoor's president about the delay in steel deliveries. Despite Edgemoor's assurances that the contract would be fulfilled, the deliveries still had not been completed by November 1881. Brooklyn mayor Seth Low, who became part of the board of trustees in 1882, became the chairman of a committee tasked to investigate Edgemoor's failure to fulfill the contract. When questioned, Edgemoor's president stated that the delays were the fault of another contractor, the Cambria Iron Company, who was manufacturing the eyebars for the bridge trusses; at that point, the contract was supposed to be complete by October 1882.

Further complicating the situation, Washington Roebling had failed to appear at the trustees' meeting in June 1882, since he had gone to Newport, Rhode Island. After the news media discovered this, most of the newspapers called for Roebling to be fired as chief engineer, except for the Daily State Gazette of Trenton, New Jersey, and the Brooklyn Daily Eagle. Some of the longstanding trustees, including Henry C. Murphy, James S. T. Stranahan, and William C. Kingsley, were willing to vouch for Roebling, since construction progress on the Brooklyn Bridge was still ongoing. However, Roebling's behavior was considered suspect among the younger trustees who had joined the board more recently.

Construction on the bridge itself was noted in formal reports that Murphy presented each month to the mayors of New York and Brooklyn. For example, Murphy's report in August 1882 noted that the month's progress included 114 intermediate cords erected within a week, as well as 72 diagonal stays, 60 posts, and numerous floor beams, bridging trusses, and stay bars. By early 1883, the Brooklyn Bridge was considered mostly completed and was projected to open that June. Contracts for bridge lighting were awarded by February 1883, and a toll scheme was approved that March.

==== Opposition ====
There was substantial opposition to the bridge's construction from shipbuilders and merchants located to the north, who argued that the bridge would not provide sufficient clearance underneath for ships. In May 1876, these groups, led by Abraham Miller, filed a lawsuit in the United States District Court for the Southern District of New York against the cities of New York and Brooklyn.

In 1879, an Assembly Sub-Committee on Commerce and Navigation began an investigation into the Brooklyn Bridge. A seaman who had been hired to determine the height of the span, testified to the committee about the difficulties that ship masters would experience in bringing their ships under the bridge when it was completed. Another witness, Edward Wellman Serrell, a civil engineer, said that the calculations of the bridge's assumed strength were incorrect. The Supreme Court decided in 1883 that the Brooklyn Bridge was a lawful structure.

=== Opening ===
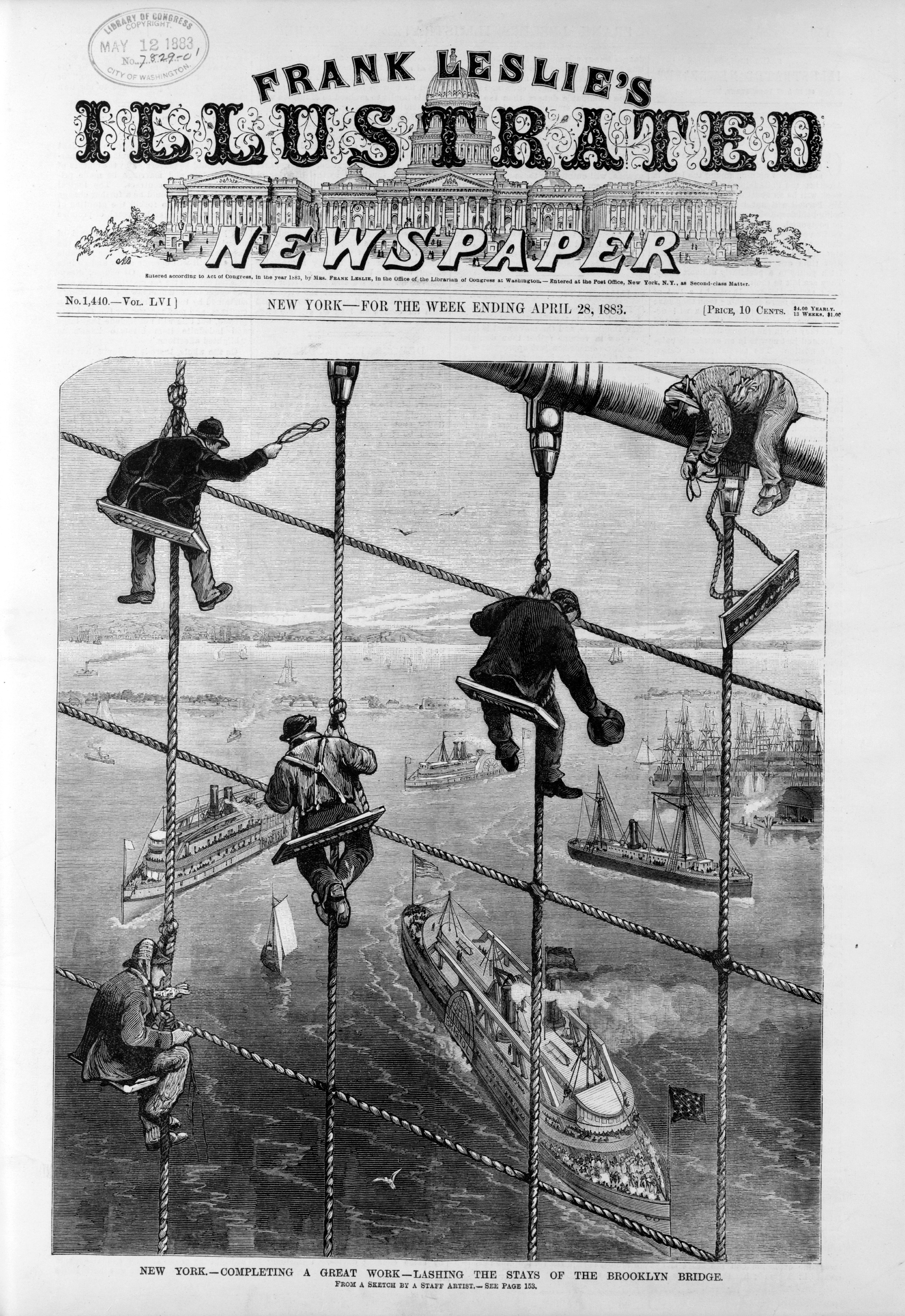
Newspaper headline announcing the Brooklyn Bridge's opening

The New York and Brooklyn Bridge was opened for use on May 24, 1883, becoming the first fixed crossing between Manhattan and Long Island. Thousands of people attended the opening ceremony, and many ships were present in the East River for the occasion. Officially, Emily Warren Roebling was the first to cross the bridge. The bridge opening was also attended by U.S. president Chester A. Arthur and New York mayor Franklin Edson, who crossed the bridge and shook hands with Brooklyn mayor Seth Low at the Brooklyn end. Abram Hewitt gave the principal address.

It is not the work of any one man or of any one age. It is the result of the study, of the experience, and of the knowledge of many men in many ages. It is not merely a creation; it is a growth. It stands before us today as the sum and epitome of human knowledge; as the very heir of the ages; as the latest glory of centuries of patient observation, profound study and accumulated skill, gained, step by step, in the never-ending struggle of man to subdue the forces of nature to his control and use.

— Abram Hewitt

Though Washington Roebling was unable to attend the ceremony (and rarely visited the site again), he held a celebratory banquet at his house on the day of the bridge opening. Further festivity included the performance by a band, gunfire from ships, and a fireworks display. On that first day, a total of 1,800 vehicles and 150,300 people crossed the span. Less than a week after the Brooklyn Bridge opened, ferry crews reported a sharp drop in patronage, while the bridge's toll operators were processing over a hundred people a minute. However, cross-river ferries continued to operate until 1942.

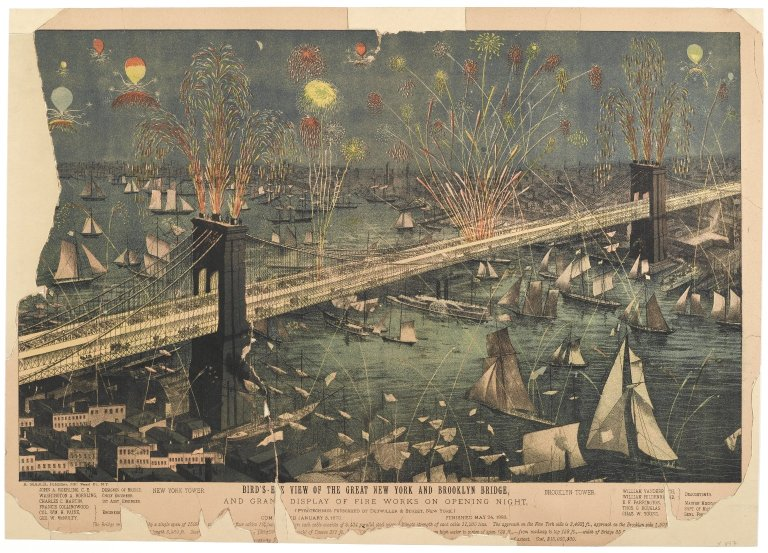
"Bird's-Eye View of the Great New York and Brooklyn Bridge and Grand Display of Fire Works on Opening Night"

The bridge had cost US$15.5 million in 1883 dollars (about US$518,304,000 in 2025) to build, of which Brooklyn paid two-thirds. The bonds to fund the construction would not be paid off until 1956. An estimated 27 men died during its construction. Since the New York and Brooklyn Bridge was the only bridge across the East River at that time, it was also called the East River Bridge. Until the construction of the nearby Williamsburg Bridge in 1903, the New York and Brooklyn Bridge was the longest suspension bridge in the world, 20% longer than any built previously.

At the time of opening, the Brooklyn Bridge was not complete; the proposed public transit across the bridge was still being tested, while the Brooklyn approach was being completed. On May 30, 1883, six days after the opening, a woman falling down a stairway at the Brooklyn approach caused a stampede which resulted in at least twelve people being crushed and killed. In subsequent lawsuits, the Brooklyn Bridge Company was acquitted of negligence. However, the company did install emergency phone boxes and additional railings, and the trustees approved a fireproofing plan for the bridge. Public transit service began with the opening of the New York and Brooklyn Bridge Railway, a cable car service, on September 25, 1883. On May 17, 1884, one of the circus master P. T. Barnum's most famous attractions, Jumbo the elephant, led a parade of 21 elephants over the Brooklyn Bridge. This helped to lessen doubts about the bridge's stability while also promoting Barnum's circus.

=== 1880s to 1900s ===
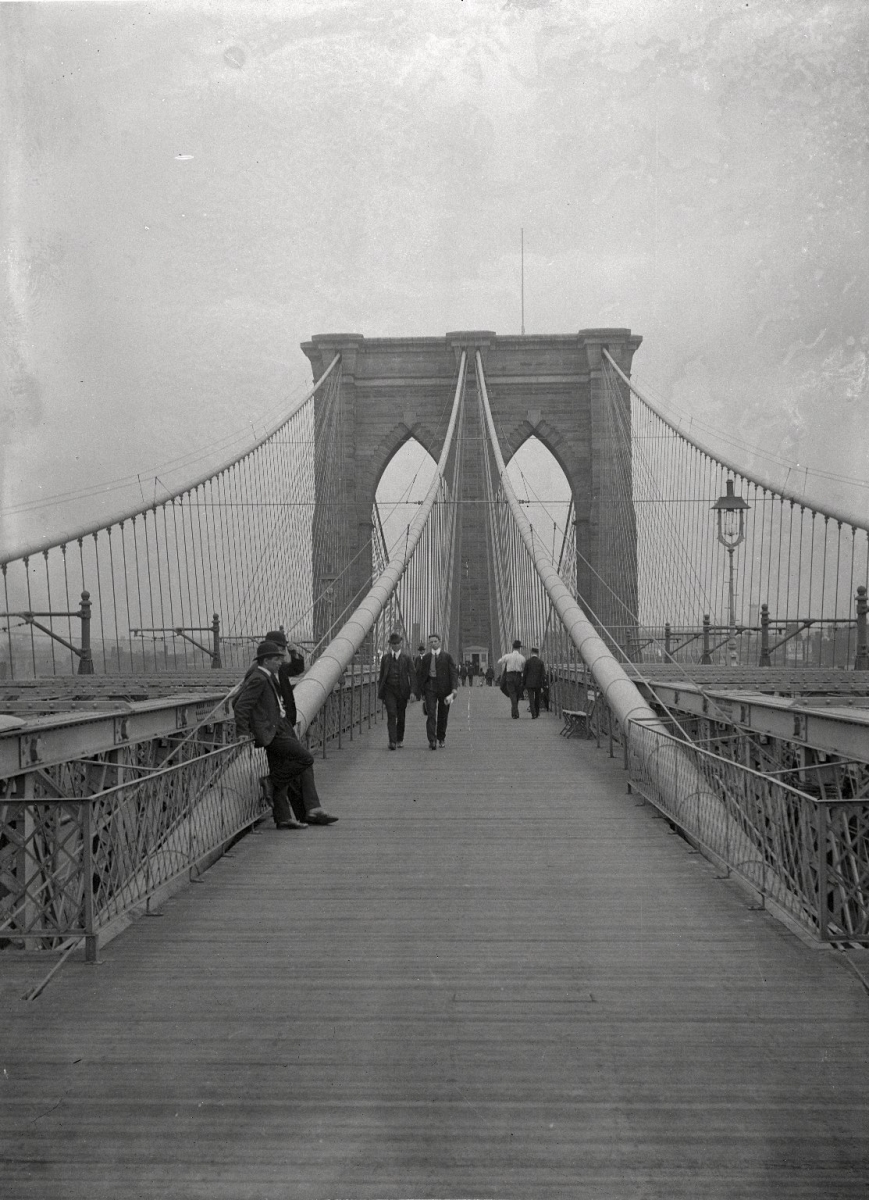
Eastward view in 1899

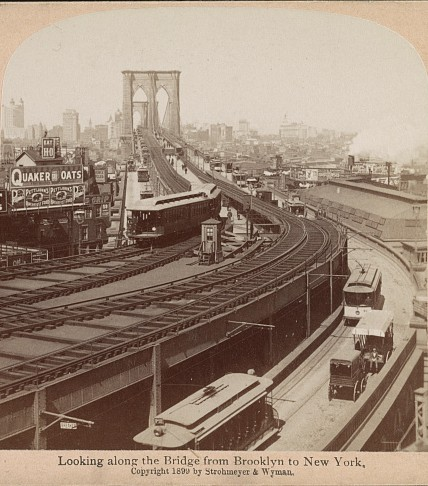
Bridge approach on Brooklyn side c. 1899

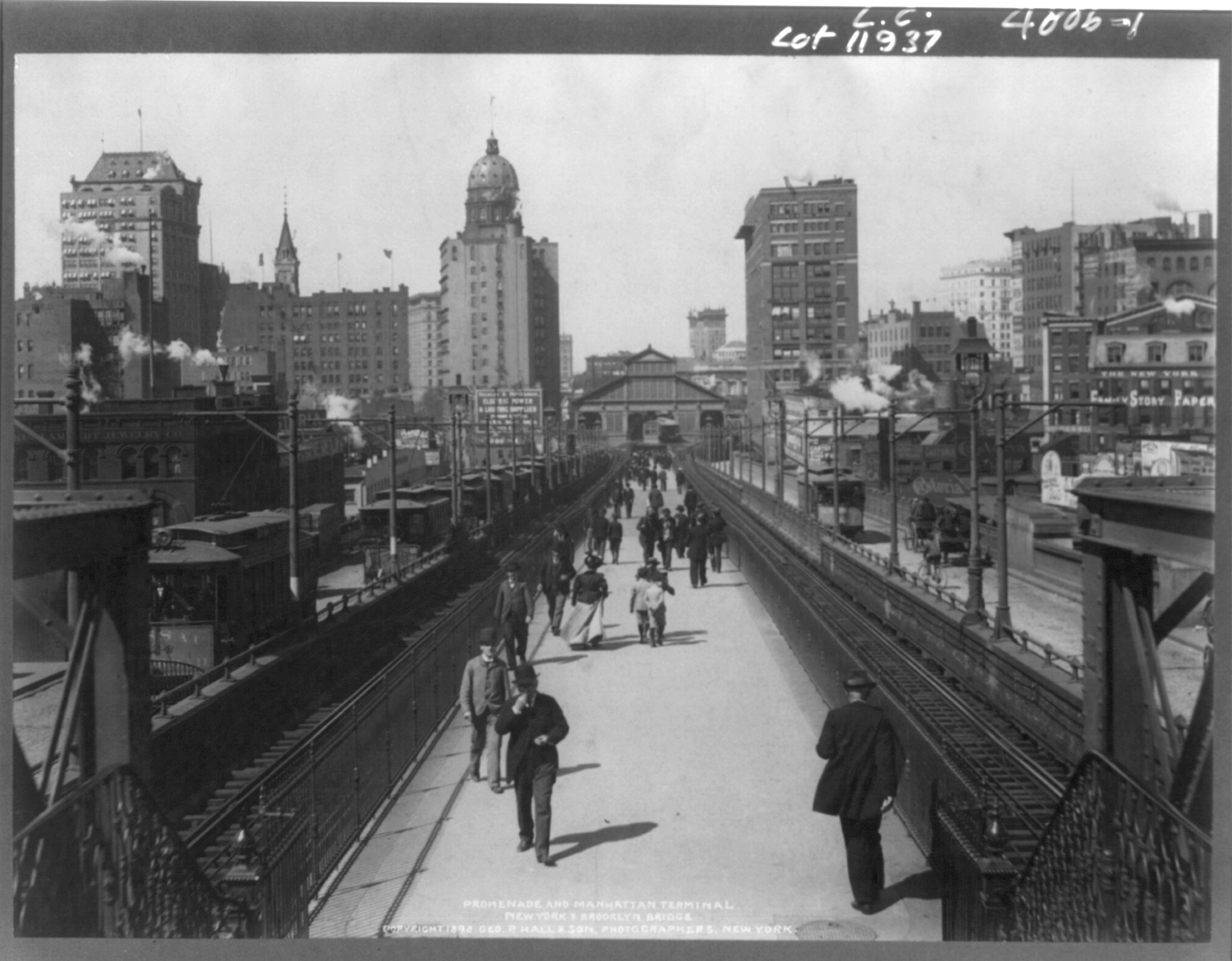
Bridge Promenade and Terminal, Manhattan side, c. 1899

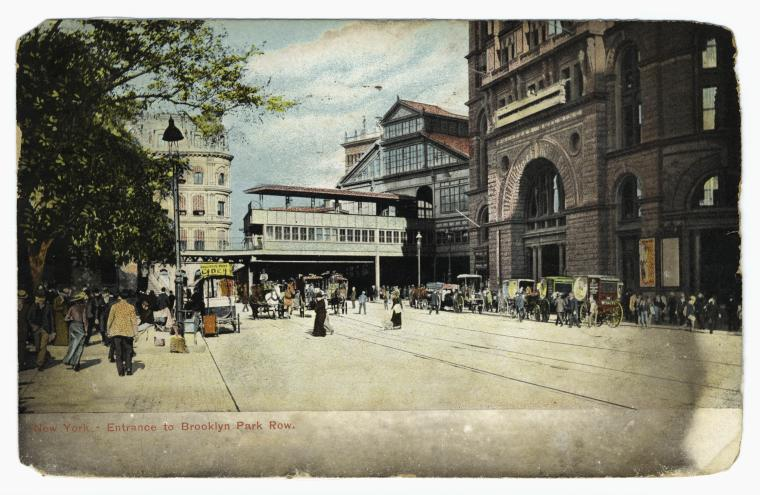
Bridge entrance on Manhattan side, c. 1911

Pedestrians walking on the bridge about 1905

Patronage across the Brooklyn Bridge increased in the years after it opened; a million people paid to cross in the first six months. The bridge carried 8.5 million people in 1884, its first full year of operation; this number doubled to 17 million in 1885 and again to 34 million in 1889. Many of these people were cable car passengers. Additionally, about 4.5 million pedestrians a year were crossing the bridge for free by 1892.

The first proposal to make changes to the bridge was sent in only two and a half years after it opened, when Linda Gilbert suggested glass steam-powered elevators and an observatory be added to the bridge and a fee charged for use, which would in part fund the bridge's upkeep and in part fund her prison reform charity. This proposal was considered but not acted upon. Numerous other proposals were made during the first fifty years of the bridge's life. Trolley tracks were added in the center lanes of both roadways in 1898, allowing trolleys to use the bridge as well. That year, the formerly separate City of Brooklyn was unified with New York City, and the Brooklyn Bridge fell under city control. Pedestrian traffic on the Brooklyn Bridge began to decline after the trolley routes opened.

Concerns about the Brooklyn Bridge's safety were raised during the turn of the century. In 1898, traffic backups due to a dead horse caused one of the truss cords to buckle. There were more significant worries after twelve suspender cables snapped in 1901, though a thorough investigation found no other defects. After the 1901 incident, five inspectors were hired to examine the bridge each day, a service that cost $250,000 a year. The Brooklyn Rapid Transit Company, which operated routes across the Brooklyn Bridge, issued a notice in 1905 saying that the bridge had reached its transit capacity.

By 1890, due to the popularity of the Brooklyn Bridge, there were proposals to construct other bridges across the East River between Manhattan and Long Island. Although a second deck for the Brooklyn Bridge was proposed, it was thought to be infeasible because doing so would overload the bridge's structural capacity. The first new bridge across the East River, the Williamsburg Bridge, opened upstream in 1903 and connected Williamsburg, Brooklyn, with the Lower East Side of Manhattan. This was followed by the Queensboro Bridge between Queens and Manhattan in March 1909, and the Manhattan Bridge between Brooklyn and Manhattan in December 1909. Several subway, railroad, and road tunnels were also constructed, which helped to accelerate the development of Manhattan, Brooklyn, and Queens.

=== 1910s to 1940s ===
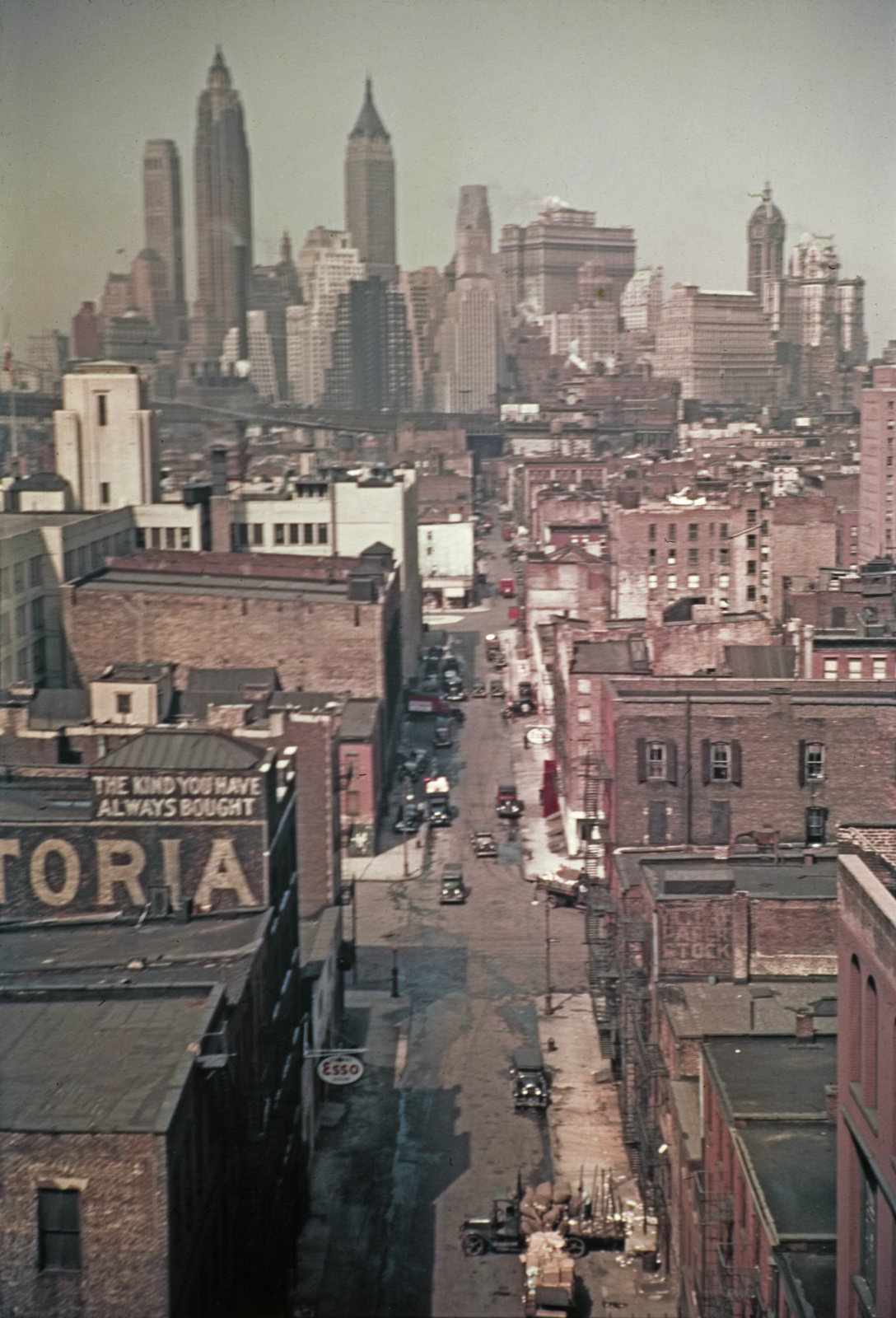
The main steel cables of the Brooklyn Bridge are visible on the left side of this photo in 1938.

Tolls on the bridge were abolished in 1911. In addition, the city government passed a bill to officially name the structure the "Brooklyn Bridge" in January 1915. Ostensibly in an attempt to reduce traffic on nearby city streets, Grover Whalen, the commissioner of Plant and Structures, banned motor vehicles from the Brooklyn Bridge on July 6, 1922. The real reason for the ban was an incident the same year where two cables slipped due to high traffic loads. Both Whalen and Roebling called for the renovation of the Brooklyn Bridge and the construction of a parallel bridge, though the parallel bridge was never built. Whalen's successor William Wirt Mills announced in 1924 that a new wood-block pavement would be installed, permitting motor vehicles to use the bridge again; motor traffic was again allowed on the bridge starting on May 12, 1925.

The city celebrated the bridge's 50th anniversary in 1933. By then, Manhattan had gained six fixed crossings to New Jersey and fifteen more to Long Island (including water pipes). The vaults under the bridge's approaches began to be leased out the next year. In 1939, as an alternative to the planned Brooklyn–Battery Bridge, Manhattan borough president Stanley M. Isaacs proposed constructing vehicular ramps from the Brooklyn Bridge to South Street along the Manhattan waterfront.

To improve traffic flow and aesthetics, the city announced plans in 1941 to remove the elevated rail stations at both ends and to upgrade the Manhattan approach viaduct. The latter would entail demolishing several city blocks and constructing vehicular ramps at the Manhattan end. Elevated rail service was ultimately withdrawn in March 1944, and after the rail terminals had been removed, Mayor Fiorello La Guardia "re-unveiled" the bridge the next year. Between November 1946 and January 1947, the Manhattan-bound roadway carried Brooklyn-bound traffic during the evening rush hours as part of an experiment.

=== Mid- to late 20th century ===
==== Upgrades ====
The first major upgrade to the Brooklyn Bridge commenced in 1948, when a contract to entirely reconstruct the approach ramps was awarded to David B. Steinman. The renovation was expected to double the capacity of the bridge's roadways to nearly 6,000 cars per hour, at a projected cost of $7 million. The renovation included the demolition of both the elevated and the trolley tracks on the roadways, the removal of trusses separating the inner elevated tracks from the existing vehicle lanes and the widening of each roadway from two to three lanes, as well as the construction of a new steel-and-concrete floor. In addition, new ramps were added to Adams Street, Cadman Plaza, and the Brooklyn Queens Expressway (BQE) on the Brooklyn side, and to Park Row on the Manhattan side. The bridge was briefly closed to all traffic for the first time ever in January 1950, and the trolley tracks closed permanently that March. During the construction project, one roadway at a time was closed, allowing reduced traffic flows to cross the bridge in one direction only.

The widened south roadway was completed in May 1951, followed by the north roadway in October 1953. The restoration was finished in May 1954 with the completion of the reconstructed elevated promenade. While the rebuilding of the span was ongoing, a fallout shelter was constructed beneath the Manhattan approach in anticipation of the Cold War. The abandoned space in one of the masonry arches was stocked with emergency survival supplies for a potential nuclear attack by the Soviet Union; these supplies remained in place half a century later. In addition, defensive barriers were added to the bridge as a safeguard against sabotage.

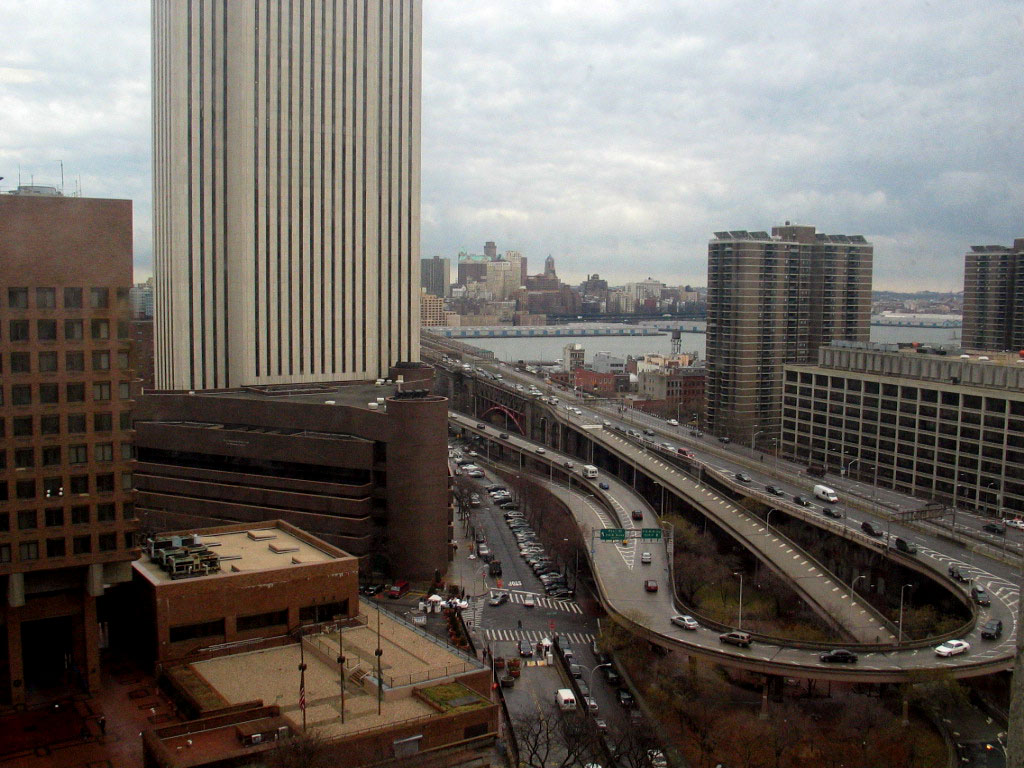
Ramp from the Brooklyn Bridge to FDR Drive (pictured in 2008), completed c. 1969

Simultaneous with the rebuilding of the Brooklyn Bridge, a double-decked viaduct for the BQE was being built through an existing steel overpass of the bridge's Brooklyn approach ramp. The segment of the BQE from Brooklyn Bridge south to Atlantic Avenue opened in June 1954, but the direct ramp from the northbound BQE to the Manhattan-bound Brooklyn Bridge did not open until 1959. The city also widened the Adams Street approach in Brooklyn, between the bridge and Fulton Street, from 60 to 160 feet (18 to 49 m) between 1954 and 1955. Subsequently, Boerum Place from Fulton Street south to Atlantic Avenue was also widened. This required the demolition of the old Kings County courthouse. The towers were cleaned in 1958 and the Brooklyn anchorage was repaired the next year.

On the Manhattan side, the city approved a controversial rebuilding of the Manhattan entrance plaza in 1953. The project, which would add a grade-separated junction over Park Row, was hotly contested because it would require the demolition of 21 structures, including the old New York World Building. The reconstruction also necessitated the relocation of 410 families on Park Row. In December 1956, the city started a two-year renovation of the plaza. This required the closure of one roadway at a time, as was done during the rebuilding of the bridge itself. Work on redeveloping the area around the Manhattan approach started in the mid-1960s. At the same time, plans were announced for direct ramps to the elevated FDR Drive to alleviate congestion at the approach. The ramp from FDR Drive to the Brooklyn Bridge was opened in 1968, followed by the ramp from the bridge to FDR Drive the next year. A single ramp from the Manhattan-bound Brooklyn Bridge to northbound Park Row was constructed in 1970. A repainting of the bridge was announced two years later in advance of its 90th anniversary.

==== Deterioration and late-20th century repair ====
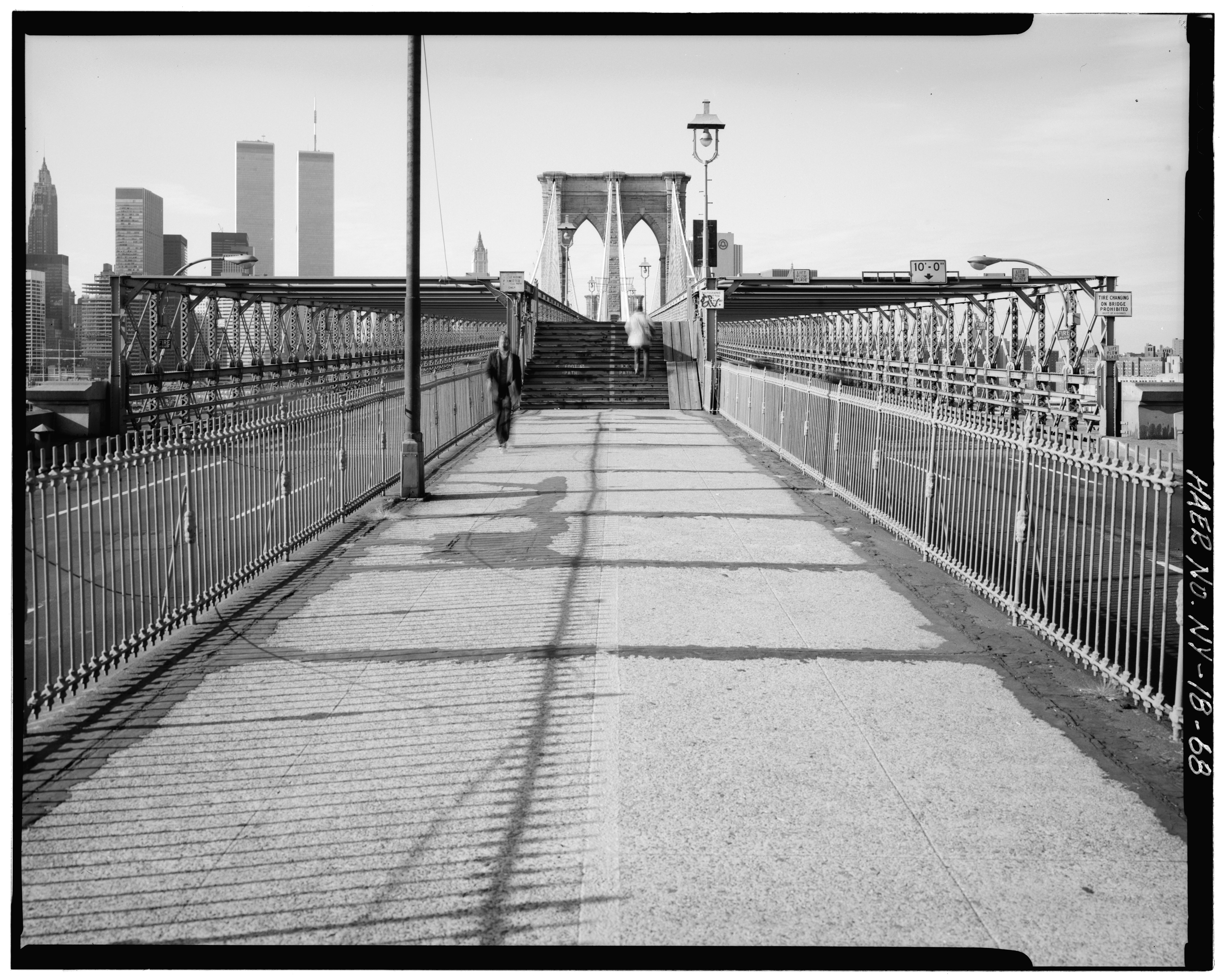
The Brooklyn Bridge formerly had steps up to the promenade from the Brooklyn approach (seen here in 1982).

The Brooklyn Bridge gradually deteriorated due to age and neglect. While it had 200 full-time dedicated maintenance workers before World War II, that number dropped to five by the late 20th century, and the city as a whole only had 160 bridge maintenance workers. In 1974, heavy vehicles such as vans and buses were banned from the bridge to prevent further erosion of the concrete roadway. A report in The New York Times four years later noted that the cables were visibly fraying and the pedestrian promenade had holes in it. The city began planning to replace all the Brooklyn Bridge's cables at a cost of $115 million, as part of a larger project to renovate the Brooklyn, Manhattan, Williamsburg, and Queensboro bridges. By 1980, the Brooklyn Bridge was in such dire condition that it faced imminent closure. In some places, half of the strands in the cables were broken.

In June 1981, two of the diagonal stay cables snapped, killing a pedestrian. Subsequently, the anchorages were found to have developed rust, and an emergency cable repair was necessitated less than a month later after another cable developed slack. Following the incident, the city accelerated the timetable of its proposed cable replacement, and it commenced a $153 million rehabilitation of the Brooklyn Bridge in advance of the 100th anniversary. As part of the project, the bridge's original vertical suspender cables installed by J. Lloyd Haigh were replaced by Bethlehem Steel in 1986, marking the cables' first replacement since construction. In addition, the staircase at Washington Street in Brooklyn was renovated, the stairs from Tillary and Adams Streets were replaced with a ramp, and the short flights of steps from the promenade to each tower's balcony were removed. In a smaller project, the bridge was floodlit at night starting in 1982 to highlight its architectural features.

Additional problems persisted, and in 1993, high levels of lead were discovered near the bridge's towers. Further emergency repairs were undertaken in mid-1999 after small concrete shards began falling from the bridge into the East River. The concrete deck had been installed during the 1950s renovations and had a lifespan of about 60 years. The Park Row exit from the bridge's westbound lanes was closed as a safety measure after the September 11, 2001, attacks on the nearby World Trade Center. That section of Park Row had been closed off since it ran right underneath 1 Police Plaza, the headquarters of the New York City Police Department (NYPD). In early 2003, to save money on electricity, the NYCDOT turned off the bridge's "necklace lights" at night. They were turned back on later that year after several private entities made donations to fund the lights.

=== 21st century ===
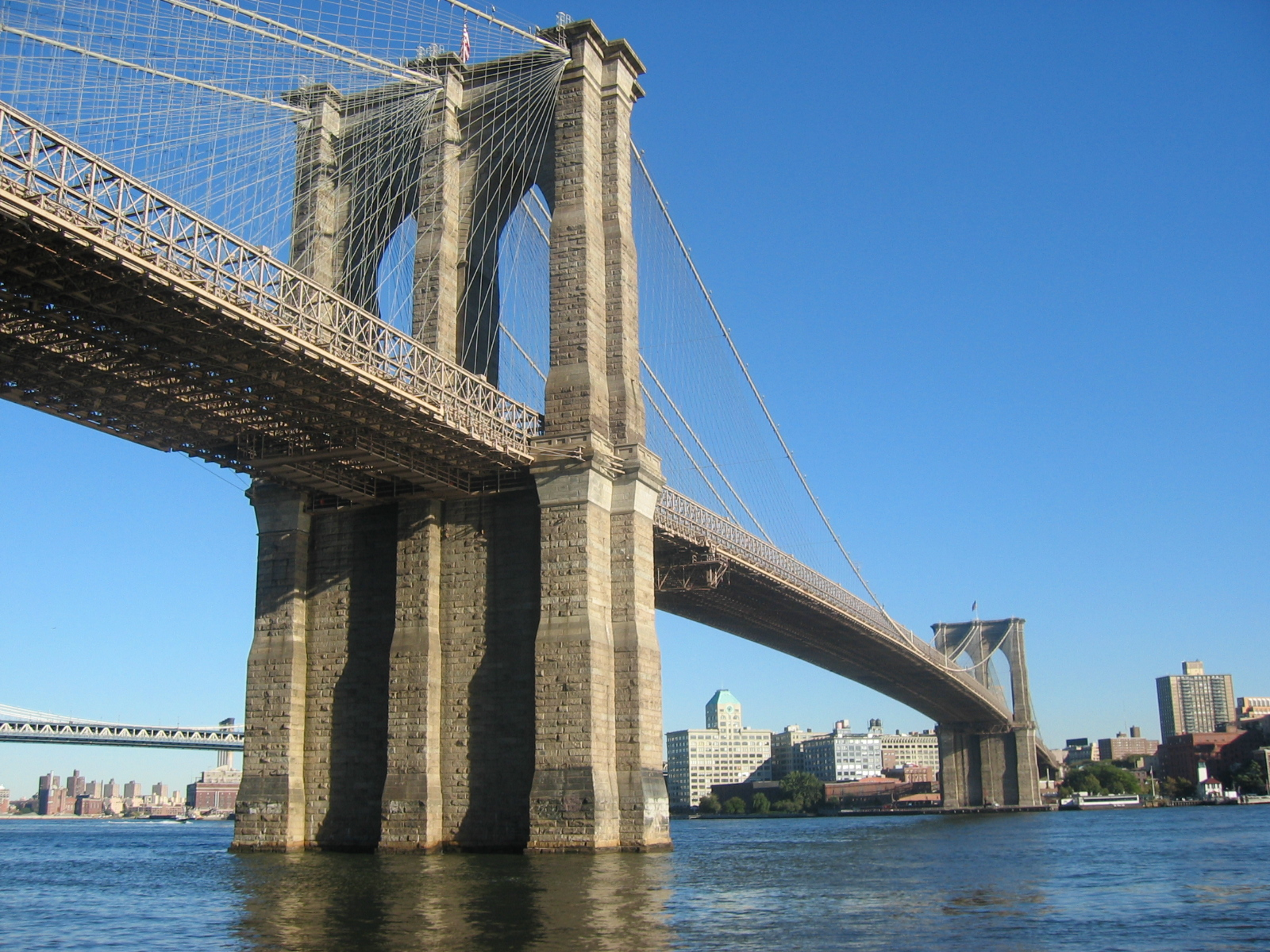
In 2004, before renovation

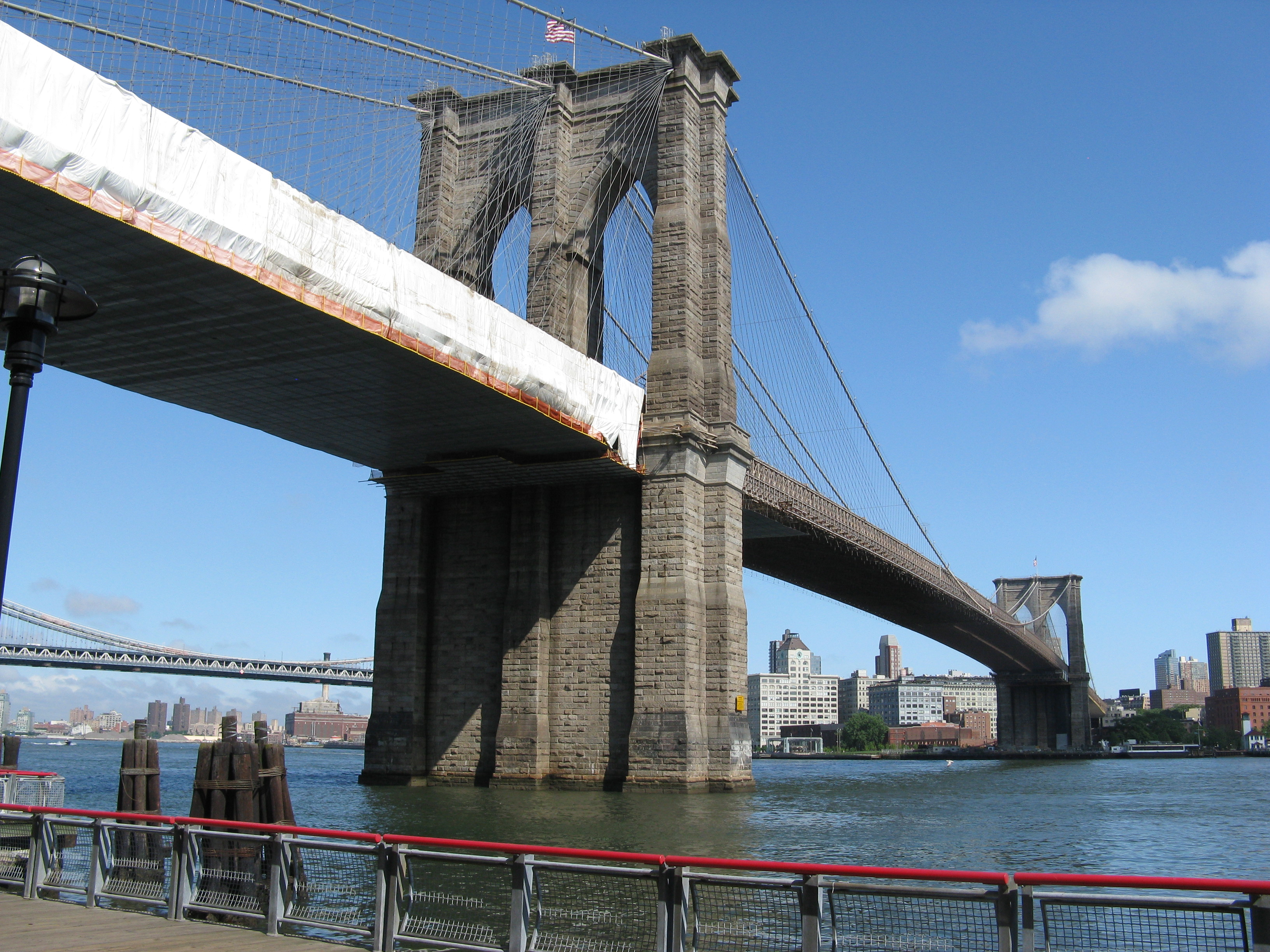
Renovation in progress

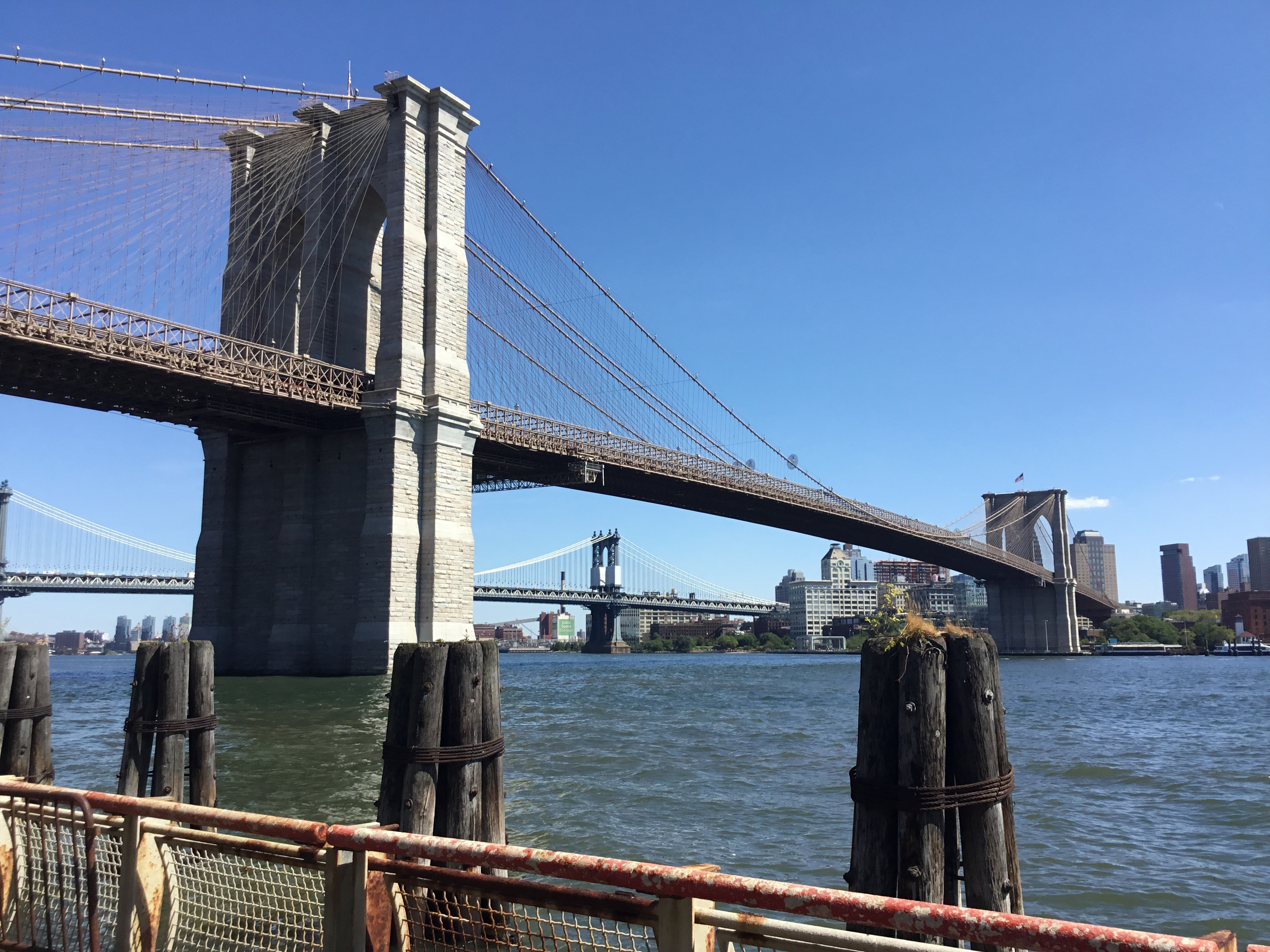
In 2022, after renovation

After the 2007 collapse of the I-35W bridge in Minneapolis, public attention focused on the condition of bridges across the U.S. The New York Times reported that the Brooklyn Bridge approach ramps had received a "poor" rating during an inspection in 2007. However, a NYCDOT spokesman said that the poor rating did not indicate a dangerous state but rather implied it required renovation. In 2010, the NYCDOT began renovating the approaches and deck, as well as repainting the suspension span. Work included widening two approach ramps from one to two lanes by re-striping a new prefabricated ramp; raising clearance over the eastbound BQE at York Street; seismic retrofitting; replacement of rusted railings and safety barriers; and road deck resurfacing. The work necessitated detours for four years. At the time, the project was scheduled to be completed in 2014; but completion was later delayed to 2015, then again to 2017. The project's cost also increased from $508 million in 2010 to $811 million in 2016.

In August 2016, the NYCDOT announced that it would conduct a seven-month, $370,000 study to verify if the bridge could support a heavier upper deck that consisted of an expanded bicycle and pedestrian path. By then, about 10,000 pedestrians and 3,500 cyclists used the pathway on an average weekday. Work on the pedestrian entrance on the Brooklyn side was underway by 2017. The NYCDOT also indicated in 2016 that it planned to reinforce the Brooklyn Bridge's foundations to prevent it from sinking, as well as repair the masonry arches on the approach ramps, which had been damaged by Hurricane Sandy four years earlier. In July 2018, the New York City Landmarks Preservation Commission approved a further renovation of the Brooklyn Bridge's suspension towers and approach ramps. That December, the federal government gave the city $25 million in funding, which would pay for a $337 million rehabilitation of the bridge approaches and the suspension towers. Work started in late 2019 and was scheduled to be completed in four years. This restoration included removing bricks from the arches and putting fresh concrete behind them, using mortar from the same upstate quarries as the original mortar. The granite arches were also cleaned, revealing the original gray color of the stone, which had long been hidden by grime. Additionally, 56 LED lamps were installed on the bridge at a cost of $2.4 million.

In early 2020, City Council speaker Corey Johnson and the nonprofit Van Alen Institute hosted an international contest to solicit plans for the redesign of the bridge's walkway. Ultimately, a protected bike path was completed on the Manhattan-bound roadway in 2021. Despite the addition of the bike path, the bridge's walkway was still frequently overcrowded, prompting the city to propose that street vendors be banned from the bridge and others citywide. All vendors were banned from the bridge in January 2024, and the same month, the bridge's new LED lights were illuminated for the first time. The National Transportation Safety Board recommended in early 2025 that the bridge undergo a structural vulnerability assessment, following the Francis Scott Key Bridge collapse in Maryland the previous year.

== Usage ==
Diagram of the pedestrian and former cycle path above and between the roadways (not to scale), before the new cycle path was opened in 2021

=== Vehicular traffic ===
Horse-drawn carriages have been allowed to use the Brooklyn Bridge's roadways since its opening. Originally, each of the two roadways carried two lanes of a different direction of traffic. The lanes were relatively narrow at only 8 feet (2.4 m) wide. In July 1922, motor vehicles were banned from the bridge; the ban lasted until May 1925.

After 1950, the main roadway carried six lanes of automobile traffic, three in each direction. Because of the roadway's posted height restriction of 11 ft (3.4 m) and weight restriction of 6,000 lb (2,700 kg), commercial vehicles and buses are prohibited from using the Brooklyn Bridge. The weight restrictions prohibit heavy passenger vehicles such as pickup trucks and SUVs from using the bridge, though this is not often enforced in practice.

In January 2021, the city decided to install a two-way protected bike path on the Manhattan-bound roadway, replacing the leftmost vehicular lane. The bike lane allowed the existing promenade to be used exclusively by pedestrians. Work on the bike lane started in June 2021, and the new path was completed on September 14, 2021. As a result, the bridge has three Brooklyn-bound and two Manhattan-bound vehicular lanes.

==== Exit list ====
On the Brooklyn side, vehicles can enter the bridge from Tillary/Adams Streets to the south, Sands/Pearl Streets to the west, and exit 28B of the eastbound Brooklyn-Queens Expressway. In Manhattan, cars can enter from both the northbound and southbound FDR Drive, as well as Park Row to the west, Chambers/Centre Streets to the north, and Pearl Street to the south. However, the exit from the bridge to northbound Park Row was closed after the September 11 attacks because of increased security concerns: that section of Park Row ran under One Police Plaza, the NYPD headquarters.

Vehicular access to the bridge is provided by a complex series of ramps on both sides of the bridge. There are two entrances to the bridge's pedestrian promenade on either side. The current configuration, including the closed ramp from the bridge to the northbound Park Row, was constructed from the mid-1950s until the early 1970s. All exits are unnumbered.

Borough	Location	mi	km	Destinations	Notes
Brooklyn	Brooklyn Heights	0.0	0.0	Tillary Street / Adams Street south	Pedestrian and bicycle path
Brooklyn	Brooklyn Heights	0.4	0.64	I-278 east (Brooklyn–Queens Expressway)	Northbound entrance only; exit 28B on I-278
Brooklyn	Brooklyn Heights	0.4	0.64	Cadman Plaza West to I-278 (Brooklyn–Queens Expressway)	Southbound exit only; access to I-278 via Old Fulton/Prospect Streets
East River		0.7– 1.0	1.1– 1.6	Suspension span	
Manhattan	Financial District	1.2	1.9	Park Row north	Northbound exit only; closed to regular traffic since the September 11 terrorist attacks
Manhattan	Financial District	1.3	2.1	FDR Drive / Pearl Street	Northbound exit and southbound entrance; exit 2 on FDR Drive
Manhattan	Financial District	1.4	2.3	Park Row south	Northbound exit and southbound entrance; pedestrian staircase
Manhattan	Financial District	1.5	2.4	Chambers Street / Centre Street to NY 9A (West Street) / Church Street	Pedestrian and bicycle path
1.000 mi = 1.609 km; 1.000 km = 0.621 mi: Closed/former; Incomplete access

=== Rail traffic ===
Formerly, rail traffic operated on the Brooklyn Bridge as well. Cable cars and elevated railroads used the bridge until 1944, while trolleys ran until 1950.

==== Cable cars and elevated railroads ====
Thomas A. Edison, Inc.: "New Brooklyn to New York Via Brooklyn Bridge", 1899

The New York and Brooklyn Bridge Railway, a cable car service, began operating on September 25, 1883; it ran on the inner lanes of the bridge, between terminals at the Manhattan and Brooklyn ends. Since Washington Roebling believed that steam locomotives would put excessive loads upon the structure of the Brooklyn Bridge, the cable car line was designed as a steam/cable-hauled hybrid. They were powered from a generating station under the Brooklyn approach. The cable cars could not only regulate their speed on the 3 3/4% upward and downward approaches, but also maintain a constant interval between each other. There were 24 cable cars in total.

Initially, the service ran with single-car trains, but patronage soon grew so much that by October 1883, two-car trains were in use. The line carried three million people in the first six months, nine million in 1884, and nearly 20 million in 1885 following the opening of the Brooklyn Union Elevated Railroad. Accordingly, the track layout was rearranged and more trains were ordered. At the same time, there were highly controversial plans to extend the elevated railroads onto the Brooklyn Bridge, under the pretext of extending the bridge itself. After disputes, the trustees agreed to build two elevated routes to the bridge on the Brooklyn side. Patronage continued to increase, and in 1888, the tracks were lengthened and even more cars were constructed to allow for four-car cable car trains. Electric wires for the trolleys were added by 1895, allowing for the potential future decommissioning of the steam/cable system. The terminals were rebuilt once more in July 1895, and, following the implementation of new electric cars in late 1896, the steam engines were dismantled and sold.

Following the unification of the cities of New York and Brooklyn in 1898, the New York and Brooklyn Bridge Railway ceased to be a separate entity that June and the Brooklyn Rapid Transit Company (BRT) assumed control of the line. The BRT started running through-services of elevated trains, which ran from Park Row Terminal in Manhattan to points in Brooklyn via the Sands Street station on the Brooklyn side. Before reaching Sands Street (at Tillary Street for Fulton Street Line trains, and at Bridge Street for Fifth Avenue Line and Myrtle Avenue Line trains), elevated trains bound for Manhattan were uncoupled from their steam locomotives. The elevated trains were then coupled to the cable cars, which would pull the passenger carriages across the bridge.

Unable to overcome the complexities required by this setup, the BRT did not run any elevated train through services (save holiday excursion trains) from July 1899 to January 1901, and again from June to October that year, but through-running became more feasible as the elevated lines began to run electric trains in the following years, eliminating the need for linking trains to cable cars. Due to increased patronage after the opening of the Interborough Rapid Transit Company (IRT)'s first subway line, the Park Row station was rebuilt in 1906. In the early 20th century, there were plans for Brooklyn Bridge elevated trains to run underground to the BRT's proposed Chambers Street station in Manhattan, though the connection was never opened. The overpass across William Street was closed in 1913 to make way for the proposed connection. In 1929, the overpass was reopened after it became clear that the connection would not be built.

After the IRT's Joralemon Street Tunnel and the Williamsburg Bridge tracks opened in 1908, the Brooklyn Bridge no longer held a monopoly on rail service between Manhattan and Brooklyn, and cable service ceased. New subway lines from the IRT and from the BRT's successor Brooklyn–Manhattan Transit Corporation (BMT), built in the 1910s and 1920s, posed significant competition to the Brooklyn Bridge rail services. With the opening of the Independent Subway System in 1932 and the subsequent unification of all three companies into a single entity in 1940, the elevated services started to decline, and the Park Row and Sands Street stations were greatly reduced in size. The Fifth Avenue and Fulton Street services across the Brooklyn Bridge were discontinued in 1940 and 1941 respectively. The elevated tracks were abandoned permanently on March 5, 1944, with the withdrawal of Myrtle Avenue services.

==== Trolleys ====
A plan for trolley service across the Brooklyn Bridge was presented in 1895. Two years later, the Brooklyn Bridge trustees agreed to a plan where trolleys could run across the bridge under ten-year contracts. Trolley service, which began in 1898, ran on what are now the two middle lanes of each roadway (shared with other traffic). Brooklyn Bridge Local trolley service between the two ends of the bridge was introduced in January 1908. The cable cars were discontinued immediately afterward, and the shuttle was also eliminated. After cable service was withdrawn, the trolley tracks on the Brooklyn side were rebuilt to alleviate congestion. Trolley service moved to the protected center tracks after elevated service ceased. On March 5, 1950, the streetcars also stopped running, and the bridge was redesigned exclusively for automobile traffic.

=== Walkway ===
The Brooklyn Bridge's elevated pedestrian promenade, near one of the "pinch points" where the cables descend below the height of the girders

The Brooklyn Bridge has an elevated promenade open to pedestrians in the center of the bridge, located 18 feet (5.5 m) above the automobile lanes. The promenade is usually located 4 feet (1.2 m) below the height of the girders, except at the approach ramps leading to each tower's balcony. The path is generally 10 to 17 feet (3.0 to 5.2 m) wide, though this is constrained by obstacles such as protruding cables, benches, and stairways, which create "pinch points" at certain locations. The path narrows to 10 feet (3.0 m) at the locations where the main cables descend to the level of the promenade. Further exacerbating the situation, these "pinch points" are some of the most popular places to take pictures. As a result, in 2016, the NYCDOT announced that it planned to double the promenade's width.

A center line was painted to separate cyclists from pedestrians in 1971, creating one of the city's first dedicated bike lanes. Initially, the northern side of the promenade was used by pedestrians and the southern side by cyclists. In 2000, these were swapped, with cyclists taking the northern side and pedestrians taking the southern side. On September 14, 2021, the NYCDOT closed off the left-side car lane on the Manhattan-bound side with protective barriers and fencing to create a new bike path, and cyclists were banned from the upper pedestrian lane.

Pedestrian access to the bridge from the Brooklyn side is from either the median of Adams Street at its intersection with Tillary Street or a staircase near Prospect Street between Cadman Plaza East and West. In Manhattan, the pedestrian walkway is accessible from crosswalks at the intersection of the bridge and Centre Street, or through a staircase leading to Park Row.

==== Emergency use ====
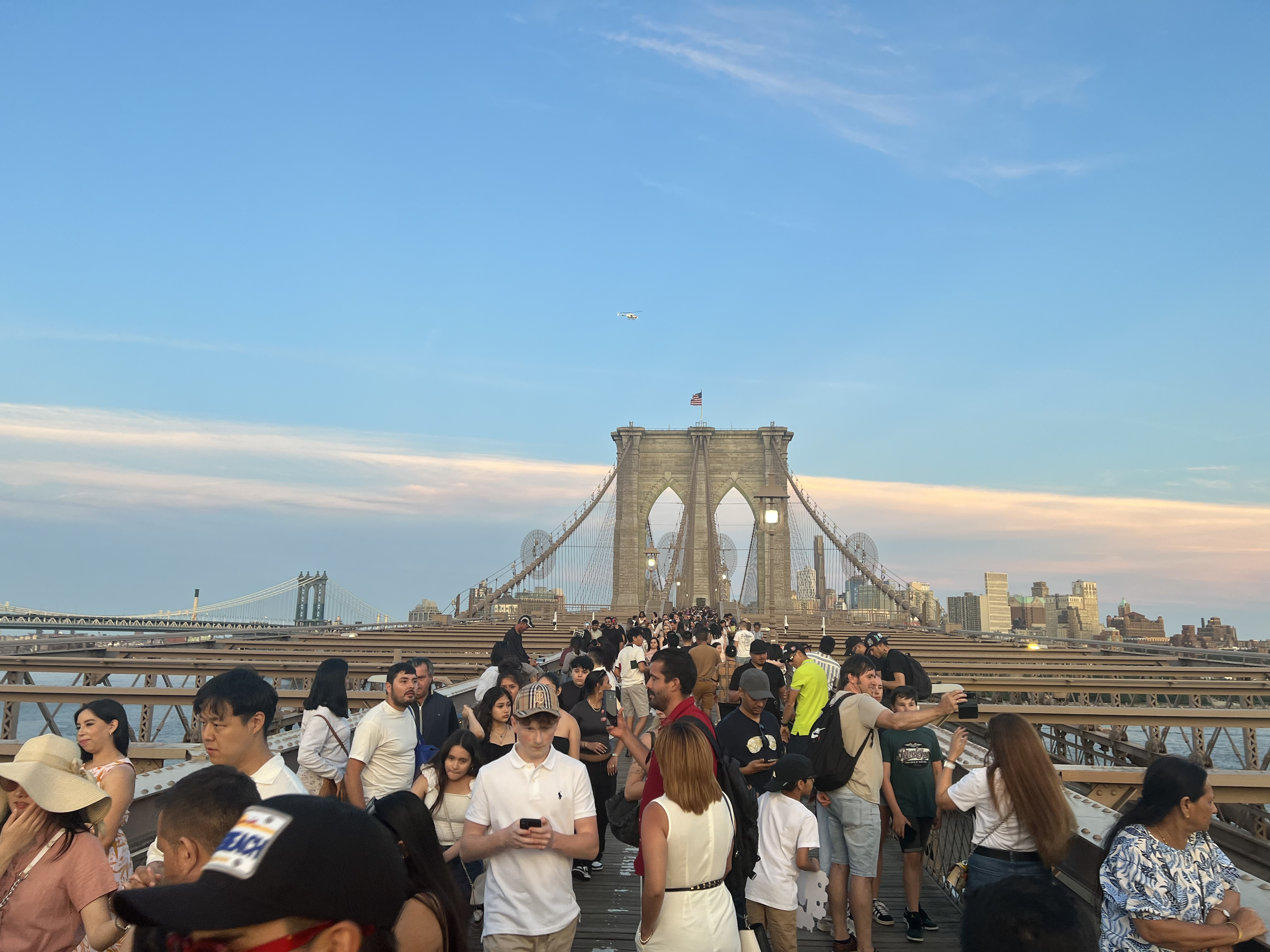
The elevated pedestrian promenade crowded with people, in the evening, during the summer season.

While the bridge has always permitted the passage of pedestrians, the promenade facilitates movement when other means of crossing the East River have become unavailable. During transit strikes by the Transport Workers Union in 1980 and 2005, people commuting to work used the bridge; they were joined by Mayors Ed Koch and Michael Bloomberg, who crossed as a gesture to the affected public. Pedestrians also walked across the bridge as an alternative to suspended subway services following the 1965, 1977, and 2003 blackouts, and after the September 11 attacks.

During the 2003 blackouts, many crossing the bridge reported a swaying motion. The higher-than-usual pedestrian load caused this swaying, which was amplified by the tendency of pedestrians to synchronize their footfalls with a sway. Several engineers expressed concern about how this would affect the bridge, although others noted that it did withstand the event and that the redundancies in its design—the inclusion of the three support systems (suspension system, diagonal stay system, and stiffening truss)—make it "probably the best secured bridge against such movements going out of control." In designing the bridge, John Roebling had stated that the bridge would sag but not fall, even if one of these structural systems were to fail altogether.

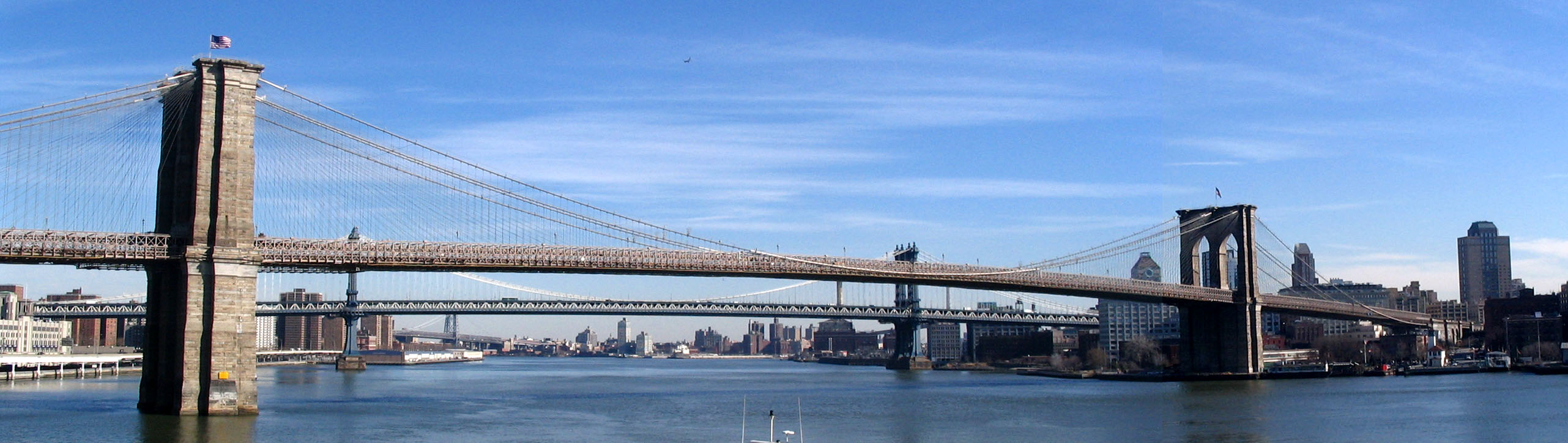
Panorama of Brooklyn Bridge, with the Manhattan Bridge behind it, and the Williamsburg Bridge visible farther in the background

== Tolls ==
The Brooklyn Bridge was initially a toll bridge. Though carriages and cable-car customers had paid tolls ever since the bridge's opening, pedestrians were spared from the tolls originally. By the first decade of the 20th century, pedestrians were also paying tolls. Tolls on all four bridges across the East River—the Brooklyn Bridge, as well as the Manhattan, Williamsburg, and Queensboro bridges to the north—were abolished in July 1911 as part of a populist policy initiative headed by New York City mayor William Jay Gaynor.

In 1970, the federal government enacted the Clean Air Act, a series of federal air pollution regulations. As part of a plan by mayor John Lindsay and the federal Environmental Protection Agency, the city government considered implementing tolls on the four free East River bridges, including the Brooklyn Bridge, in the early 1970s. The plan would have raised money for New York City's transit system and allowed the city to meet the Clean Air Act. Abraham Beame, who became mayor in 1974, refused to implement the tolls, and the United States Congress subsequently moved to forbid tolls on the free East River bridges. The United States Department of Transportation determined that several of these bridges were built partially with federal funds and, under federal law, could not be tolled.

A plan for congestion pricing in New York City was approved in mid-2023, allowing the Metropolitan Transportation Authority to toll drivers who enter Manhattan south of 60th Street. Congestion pricing was implemented in January 2025. Traffic between the Brooklyn Bridge and the northbound FDR Drive is exempt from the toll, but all other Manhattan-bound drivers pay a toll, which varies based on the time of day. Although no toll is charged upon exiting the congestion zone, Brooklyn-bound drivers must pay a toll to access streets leading to the bridge, unless they use the FDR Drive. (Note: Under the plan, drivers traveling westbound from the bridge to FDR Drive north, or from FDR Drive to the bridge eastbound, would be exempt from the toll. Drivers traveling westbound from the bridge to FDR Drive south would pay a toll because that ramp uses city streets.)

== Notable events ==
=== Stunts ===
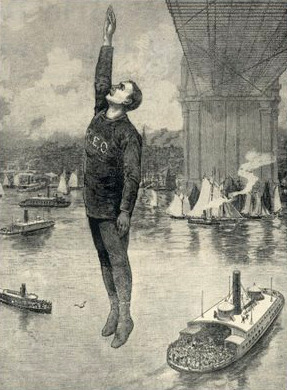
Robert Emmet Odlum jumping from the bridge on May 19, 1885

There have been several notable jumpers from the Brooklyn Bridge. The first person was Robert Emmet Odlum, brother of women's rights activist Charlotte Odlum Smith, on May 19, 1885. He struck the water at an angle and died shortly afterwards from internal injuries. Steve Brodie supposedly dropped from underneath the bridge in July 1886 and was briefly arrested for it, though there is some doubt about whether he actually jumped. Larry Donovan made a slightly higher jump from the railing a month afterward. The first known person to jump from the bridge with the intention of suicide was Francis McCarey in 1892. A lesser known early jumper was James Duffy of County Cavan, Ireland, who on April 15, 1895, asked several men to watch him jump from the bridge. Duffy jumped and was not seen again. Additionally, the cartoonist Otto Eppers jumped and survived in 1910, and was then tried and acquitted for attempted suicide. The Brooklyn Bridge has since developed a reputation as a suicide bridge due to the number of jumpers who do so intending to kill themselves, though exact statistics are difficult to find.

Other notable feats have taken place on or near the bridge. In 1919, Giorgio Pessi piloted what was then one of the world's largest airplanes, the Caproni Ca.5, under the bridge. In 1993, bridge jumper Thierry Devaux illegally performed eight acrobatic bungee jumps above the East River close to the Brooklyn tower.

=== Crimes and terrorism ===
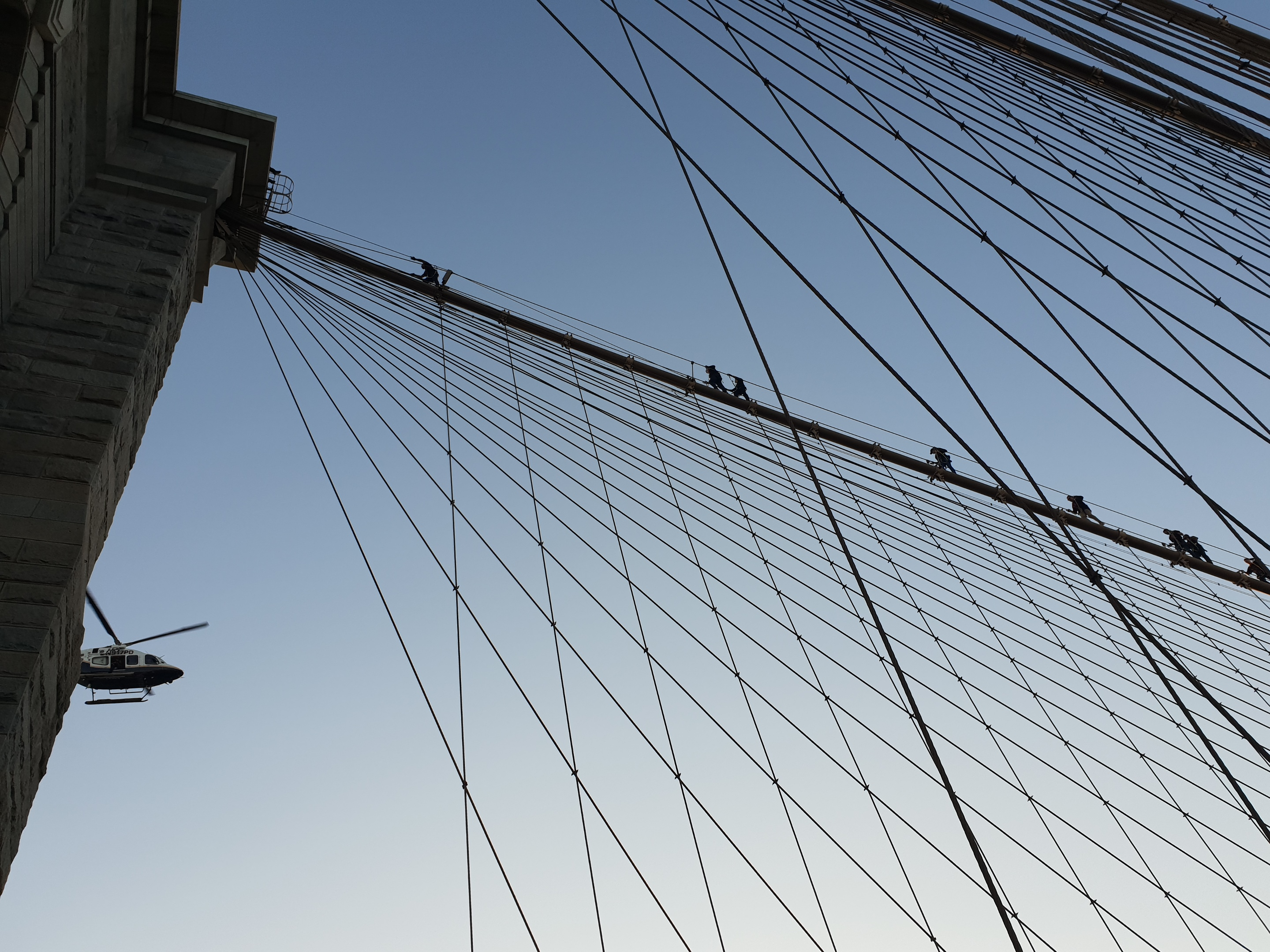
A police training exercise on the bridge, 2024

On March 1, 1994, Lebanese-born Rashid Baz opened fire on a van carrying members of the Chabad-Lubavitch Orthodox Jewish Movement, striking 16-year-old student Ari Halberstam and three others traveling on the bridge. Halberstam died five days later from his wounds, and Baz was later convicted of murder. He was apparently acting out of revenge for the Hebron massacre of Palestinian Muslims a few days prior to the incident. After initially classifying the killing as one committed out of road rage, the Justice Department reclassified the case in 2000 as a terrorist attack. The entrance ramp to the bridge on the Manhattan side was dedicated as the Ari Halberstam Memorial Ramp in 1995.

Several potential attacks or disasters have also been averted. In 1979, police disarmed a stick of dynamite placed under the Brooklyn approach, and an artist in Manhattan was arrested that year after another bombing attempt. In 2003, truck driver Iyman Faris was sentenced to about 20 years in prison for providing material support to Al-Qaeda, after an earlier plot to destroy the bridge by cutting through its support wires with blowtorches was thwarted.

=== Arrests ===
At 9:00 a.m. on May 19, 1977, artist Jack Bashkow climbed one of the towers for Bridging, a "media sculpture" by the performance group Art Corporation of America Inc. Seven artists climbed the largest bridges connected to Manhattan "to replace violence and fear in mass media for one day". When each of the artists had reached the tops of the bridges, they ignited bright-yellow flares at the same moment, resulting in rush hour traffic disruption, media attention, and the arrest of the climbers, though the charges were later dropped. Called "the first social-sculpture to use mass-media as art" by conceptual artist Joseph Beuys, the event was on the cover of the New York Post, received international attention, and received ABC Eyewitness News' 1977 Best News of the Year award. John Halpern documented the incident in the film Bridging, 1977. Halpern attempted another "bridging" "social sculpture" in 1979, when he planted a radio receiver, gunpowder and fireworks in a bucket atop one of the towers. The piece was later discovered by police, leading to his arrest for possessing a bomb.

On October 1, 2011, more than 700 protesters with the Occupy Wall Street movement were arrested while attempting to march across the bridge on the roadway. Protesters disputed the police account of the events and claimed that the arrests were the result of being trapped on the bridge by the NYPD. The majority of the arrests were subsequently dismissed.

On July 22, 2014, the two American flags on the flagpoles atop each tower were found to have been replaced by bleached-white American flags. Initially, cannabis activism was suspected as a motive, but on August 12, 2014, two Berlin artists claimed responsibility for hoisting the two white flags, having switched out the original flags with their replicas. The artists said that the flags were meant to celebrate "the beauty of public space" and the anniversary of the death of German-born John Roebling, and they denied that it was an "anti-American statement".

=== Anniversary celebrations ===
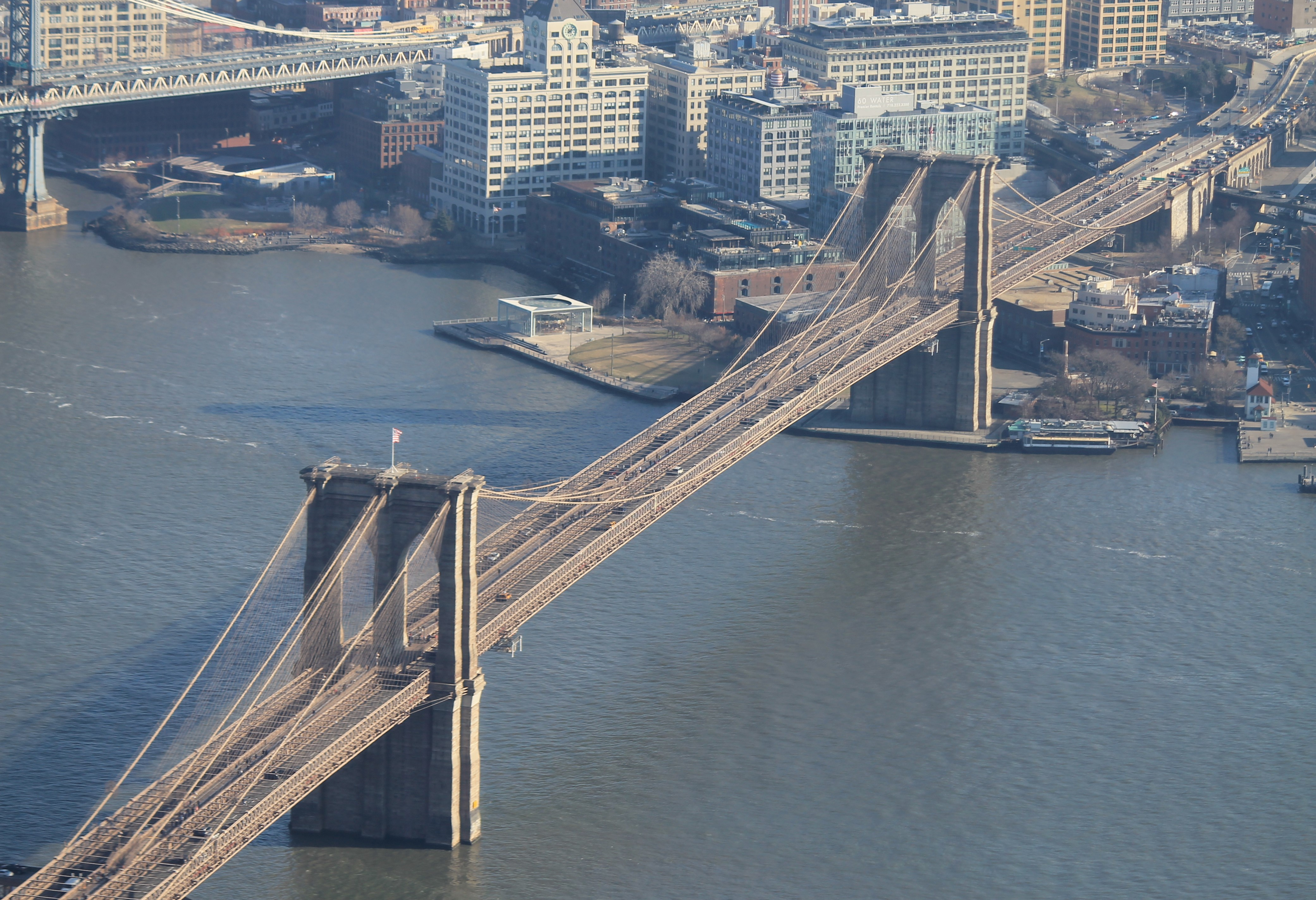
Brooklyn Bridge seen from One World Trade Center Skypod

The 50th-anniversary celebrations on May 24, 1933, included a ceremony featuring an airplane show, ships, and fireworks, as well as a banquet. During the centennial celebrations on May 24, 1983, a flotilla of ships visited the harbor, officials held parades, and Grucci Fireworks held a fireworks display that evening. For the centennial, the Brooklyn Museum exhibited a selection of the original drawings made for the bridge's construction, including those by Washington Roebling. Media coverage of the centennial was declared "the public relations triumph of 1983" by Inc.

The 125th anniversary of the bridge's opening was celebrated by a five-day event on May 22–26, 2008, which included a live performance by the Brooklyn Philharmonic, a special lighting of the bridge's towers, and a fireworks display. Other events included a film series, historical walking tours, information tents, a series of lectures and readings, a bicycle tour of Brooklyn, a miniature golf course featuring Brooklyn icons, and other musical and dance performances. Just before the anniversary celebrations, artist Paul St George installed the Telectroscope, a video link on the Brooklyn side of the bridge that connected to a matching device on London's Tower Bridge. A renovated pedestrian connection to Dumbo, Brooklyn, was also reopened before the anniversary celebrations.

=== Collisions ===
Over the years, numerous vessels have struck the bridge. In 1921, the steel mast of the schooner Edward J. Lawrence was bent while being towed under the bridge deck. and in 1935, three of the four steel masts on the freighter Tirpitz hit the bridge deck. Additionally, the radar of the freighter Hai Soo was destroyed in 1986 when it struck a net below the Brooklyn Bridge's deck. In 2023, a crane arm struck the scaffolding and the I-beam structure of the bridge whilst being towed on the barge.

The masts of the Mexican Navy training ship ARM Cuauhtémoc smashed into the bridge deck on May 17, 2025, with approximately 200 people on the ship. The ship masts were at least 20 feet (6.1 m) higher than the Brooklyn Bridge's navigational clearance of 127 feet (39 m). Two people were killed and 19 injured, but the structure of the bridge was undamaged.

== Impact ==
At the time of construction, contemporaries marveled at what technology was capable of, and the bridge became a symbol of the era's optimism. John Perry Barlow wrote in the late 20th century of the "literal and genuinely religious leap of faith" embodied in the bridge's construction, saying that the "Brooklyn Bridge required of its builders faith in their ability to control technology".

=== Historical designations and plaques ===
Brooklyn Bridge plaques

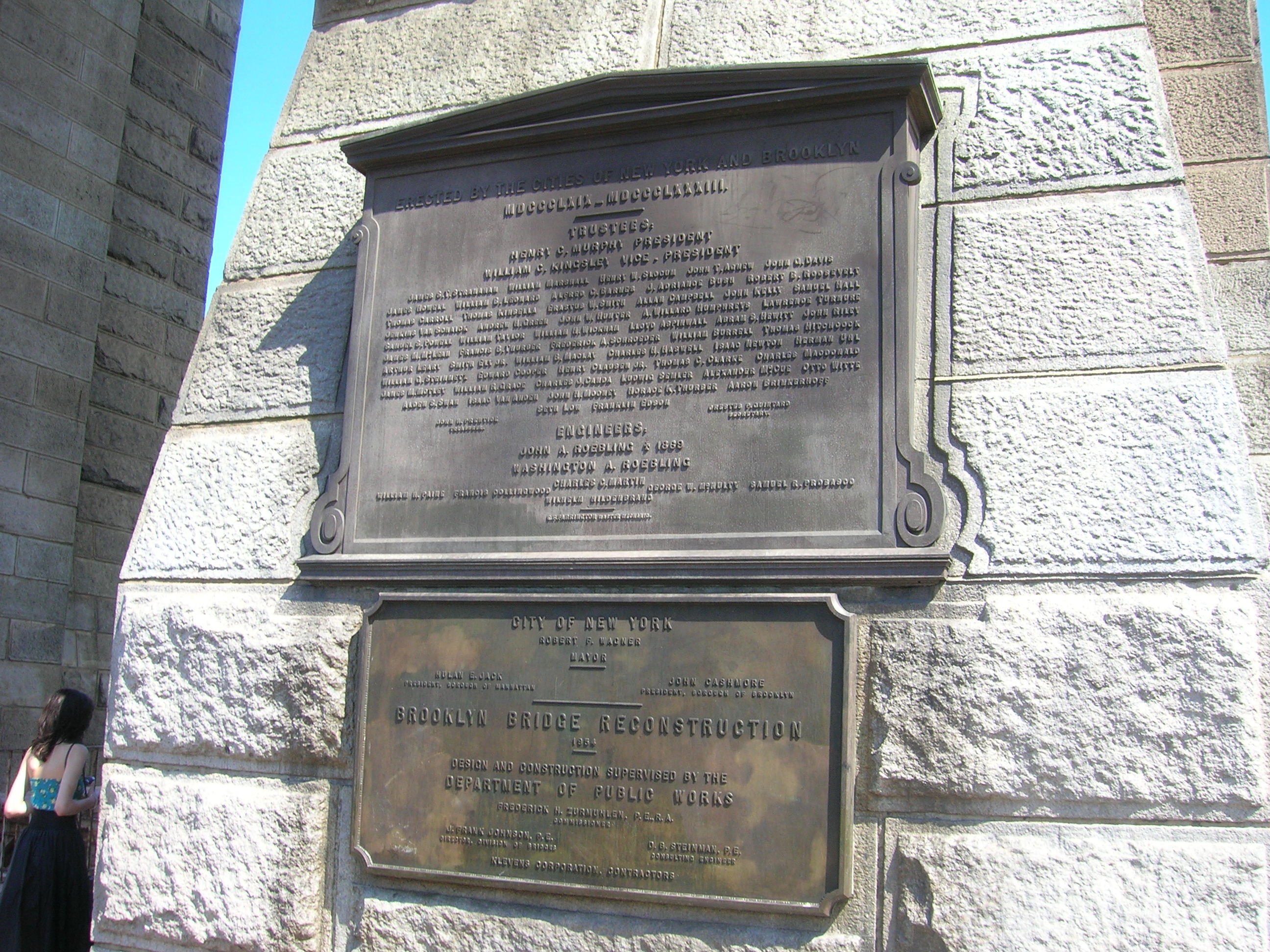
Dedication and renovation plaque, at Manhattan tower

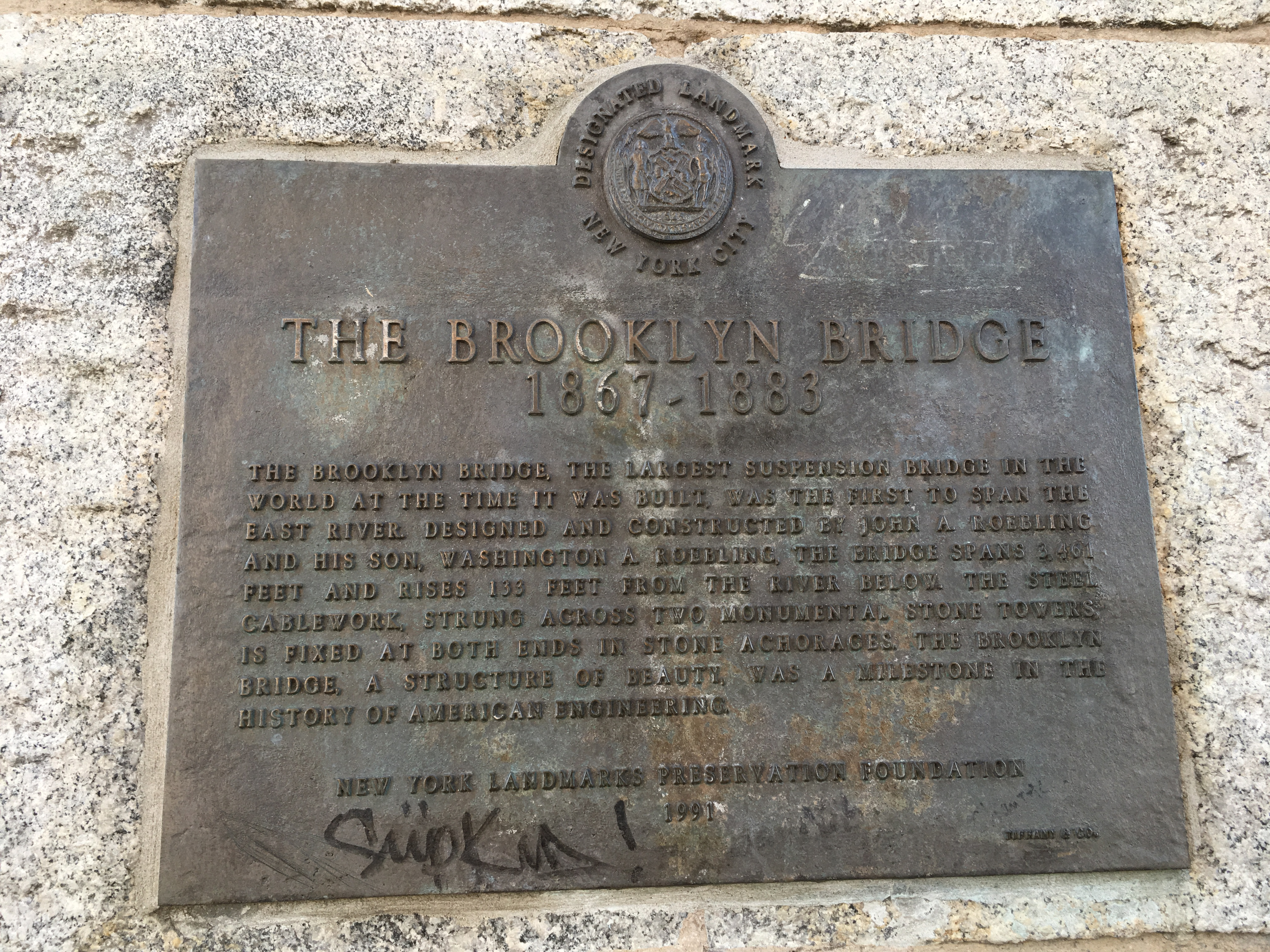
New York City designated landmark plaque

The Brooklyn Bridge has been listed as a National Historic Landmark since January 29, 1964, and was subsequently added to the National Register of Historic Places on October 15, 1966. The bridge has also been a New York City designated landmark since August 24, 1967, and was designated a National Historic Civil Engineering Landmark in 1972. In addition, it was placed on UNESCO's list of tentative World Heritage Sites in 2017.

A bronze plaque is attached to the Manhattan anchorage, which was constructed on the site of the Samuel Osgood House at 1 Cherry Street in Manhattan. Named after Samuel Osgood, a Massachusetts politician and lawyer, it was built in 1770 and served as the first U.S. presidential mansion. The Osgood House was demolished in 1856.

Another plaque on the Manhattan side of the pedestrian promenade, installed by the city in 1975, indicates the bridge's status as a city landmark.

=== Culture ===
The Brooklyn Bridge has had an impact on idiomatic American English. For example, references to "selling the Brooklyn Bridge" are frequent in American culture, sometimes presented as a historical reality but more often as an expression meaning an idea that strains credulity. George C. Parker and William McCloundy were two early 20th-century con men who may have perpetrated this scam successfully, particularly on new immigrants, although the author of The Brooklyn Bridge: A Cultural History wrote, "No evidence exists that the bridge has ever been sold to a 'gullible outlander'".

To highlight the Brooklyn Bridge's cultural status, the city proposed building a Brooklyn Bridge museum near the bridge's Brooklyn end in the 1970s. Though the museum was ultimately not constructed, as many as 10,000 drawings and documents relating to it were found in a carpenter shop in Williamsburg in 1976. These documents were given to the New York City Municipal Archives, where they are normally located, though a selection of them were displayed at the Whitney Museum of American Art when they were discovered.

==== Love locks ====
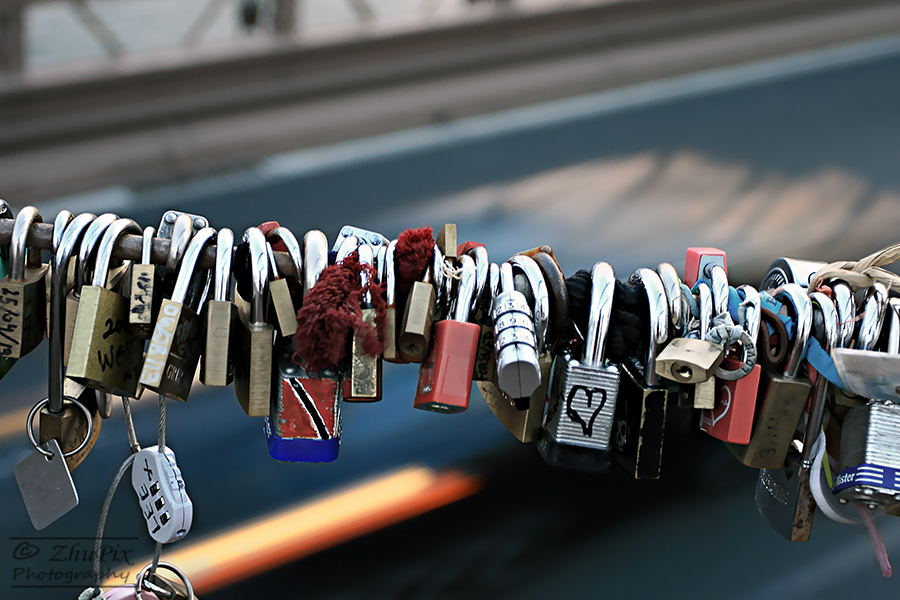
Love locks on the Brooklyn Bridge

As a tourist attraction, the Brooklyn Bridge is a popular site for clusters of love locks, wherein a couple inscribes a date and their initials onto a lock, attach it to the bridge, and throw the key into the water as a sign of their love. The practice is illegal in New York City and the NYPD can give violators a $100 fine. NYCDOT workers periodically remove the love locks from the bridge at a cost of $100,000 per year. There have been private efforts to remove the locks as well; for example, one man led a group of lock-breakers to remove some locks in February 2013, and a local woman periodically removed locks and garbage from the bridge in early 2026.

=== Media ===
The bridge is often featured in wide shots of the New York City skyline in television and film and has been depicted in numerous works of art. Fictional works have used the Brooklyn Bridge as a setting; for instance, the dedication of a portion of the bridge, and the bridge itself, were key components in the 2001 film Kate & Leopold. Furthermore, the Brooklyn Bridge has also served as an icon of America, with mentions in numerous songs, books, and poems. Among the most notable of these works is that of American Modernist poet Hart Crane, who used the Brooklyn Bridge as a central metaphor and organizing structure for his second book of poetry, The Bridge (1930).

The Brooklyn Bridge has also been lauded for its architecture. One of the first positive reviews was "The Bridge As A Monument", a Harper's Weekly piece written by architecture critic Montgomery Schuyler and published a week after the bridge's opening. In the piece, Schuyler wrote: "It so happens that the work which is likely to be our most durable monument, and to convey some knowledge of us to the most remote posterity, is a work of bare utility; not a shrine, not a fortress, not a palace, but a bridge." Architecture critic Lewis Mumford cited the piece as the impetus for serious architectural criticism in the U.S. He wrote that in the 1920s the bridge was a source of "joy and inspiration" in his childhood, and that it was a profound influence in his adolescence. Later critics regarded the Brooklyn Bridge as a work of art, as opposed to an engineering feat or a means of transport. Conversely, Henry James, writing in the early 20th century, cited the bridge as an ominous symbol of the city's transformation into a "steel-souled machine room".

The construction of the Brooklyn Bridge is detailed in numerous media sources, including David McCullough's 1972 book The Great Bridge and Ken Burns's 1981 documentary Brooklyn Bridge. It is also described in Seven Wonders of the Industrial World, a BBC docudrama series with an accompanying book, as well as Chief Engineer: Washington Roebling, The Man Who Built the Brooklyn Bridge, a biography published in 2017. The Brooklyn Bridge and Emily Roebling's role in its construction were featured in season 2, episode 5 of the TV series The Gilded Age. In early 2026, the Metropolitan Museum of Art featured presentation drawings from the construction of the bridge in its exhibit The Brooklyn Bridge Up Close.

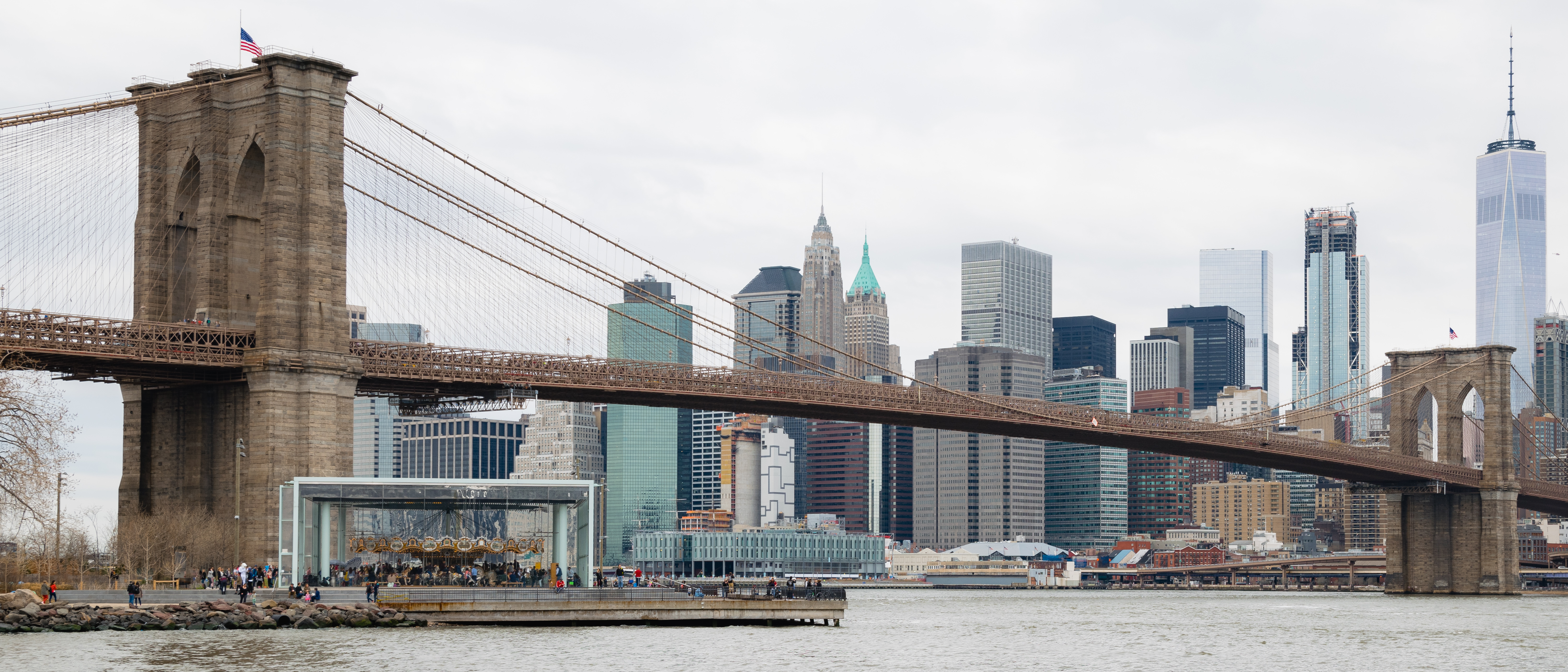
The Brooklyn Bridge with Manhattan in the background, seen at daytime from Brooklyn in 2017
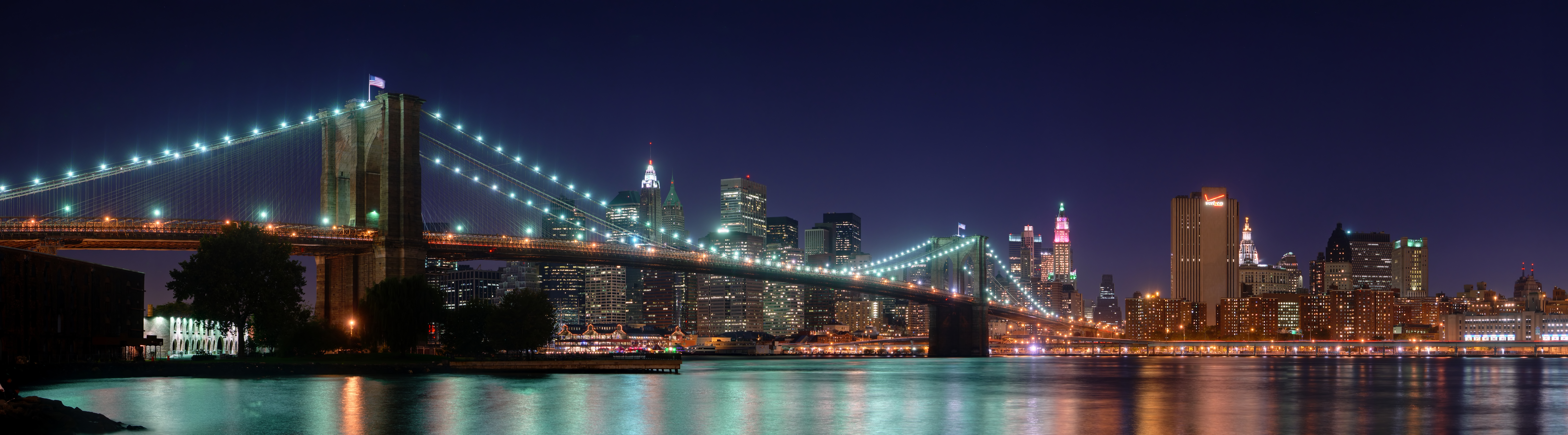
The same view at night in 2008
A comparison of the side elevation of the Brooklyn Bridge to the side elevations of some of the most notable bridges around the world on the same scale (see also interactive version)

== See also ==
- Brooklyn Bridge Park
- Brooklyn Bridge trolleys
- List of bridges and tunnels in New York City
- List of bridges and tunnels on the National Register of Historic Places in New York
- List of bridges documented by the Historic American Engineering Record in New York
- List of National Historic Landmarks in New York City
- List of New York City Designated Landmarks in Manhattan below 14th Street
- List of New York City Designated Landmarks in Brooklyn
- List of tallest structures built before the 20th century
- National Register of Historic Places listings in Manhattan below 14th Street
- National Register of Historic Places listings in Brooklyn
