= Brooklyn Bridge architectural drawings =

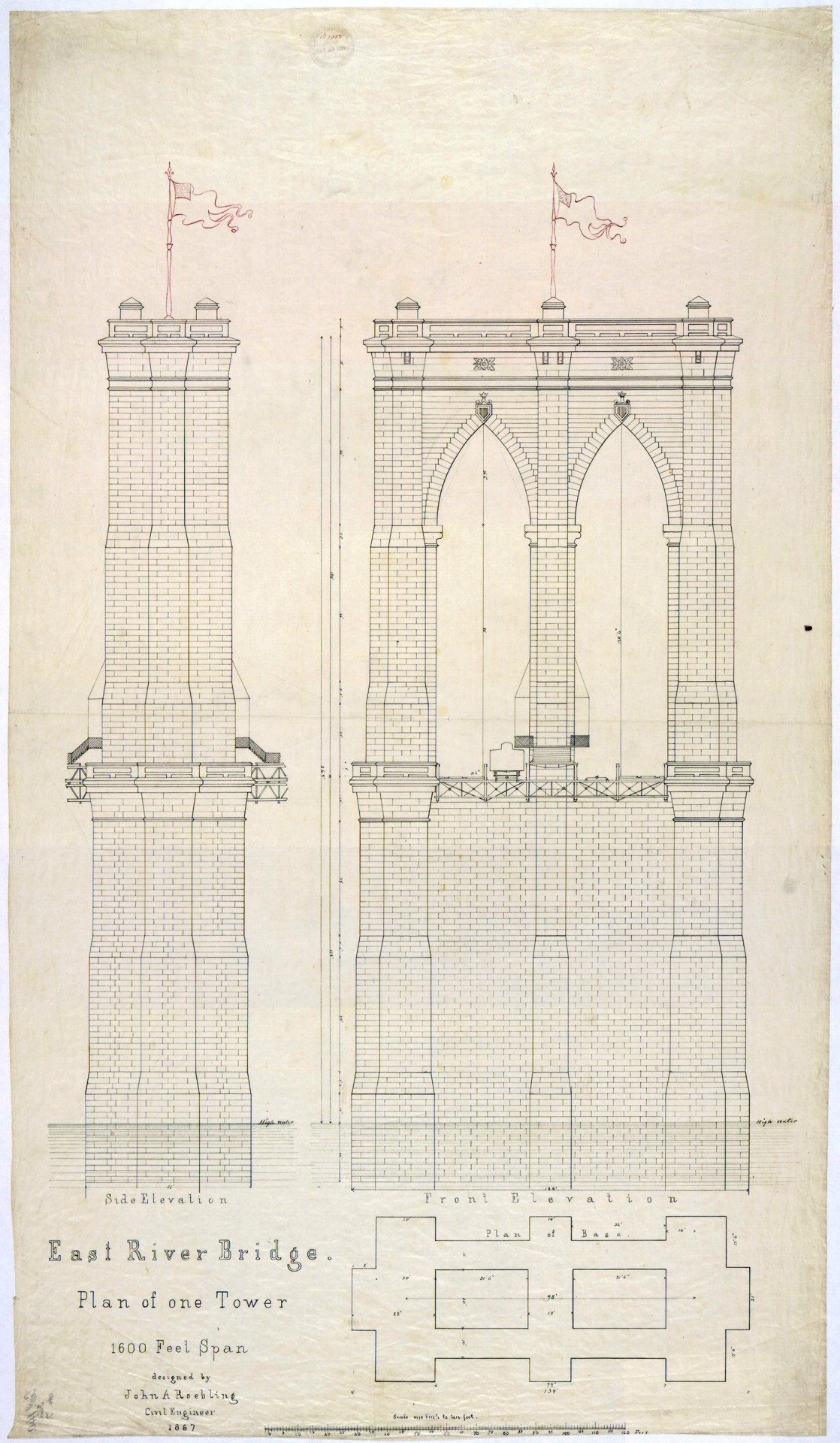
Early Brooklyn Bridge tower plan, 1867

The Brooklyn Bridge architectural drawings are a collection of some 10,000 hand-drawn plans, maps, blueprints, and images that were created in the period 1867–1883 for the construction of the Brooklyn Bridge in New York City. They are unique in that they represent a rare complete record of an enormous engineering project from the 1800s. They are also valued for their artistic quality.

They contain exhaustive drawings and plans of components of the bridge, the equipment used or created for the project, trolley and rail lines, pedestrian walkways, and more. Many of the drawings are signed by the original draftsmen and planners, including approximately 500 by the lead engineer, Washington Roebling. The collection is housed at the New York City Municipal Archives.

== Building of the bridge ==
In February 1867, the New York State Senate passed a bill that allowed the construction of a suspension bridge from Brooklyn to Manhattan. German immigrant engineer John Augustus Roebling was named the chief engineer of the work and, by September 1867, had produced a master plan. Roebling was an experienced bridge builder who had recently completed the Cincinnati-Covington Bridge in Cincinnati, Ohio, which at the time was the longest suspension bridge in the world, with a total length of 1,642 ft (500.5 m) feet. The bridge crossing the East River from Brooklyn to Manhattan was to have a much longer main span and a total length almost four times as long, at 6,016 ft (1,833.7 m) feet. The Brooklyn Bridge was to be one of the most challenging engineering projects of all time. "Everything about it was unprecedented," said historian Erica Wagner.

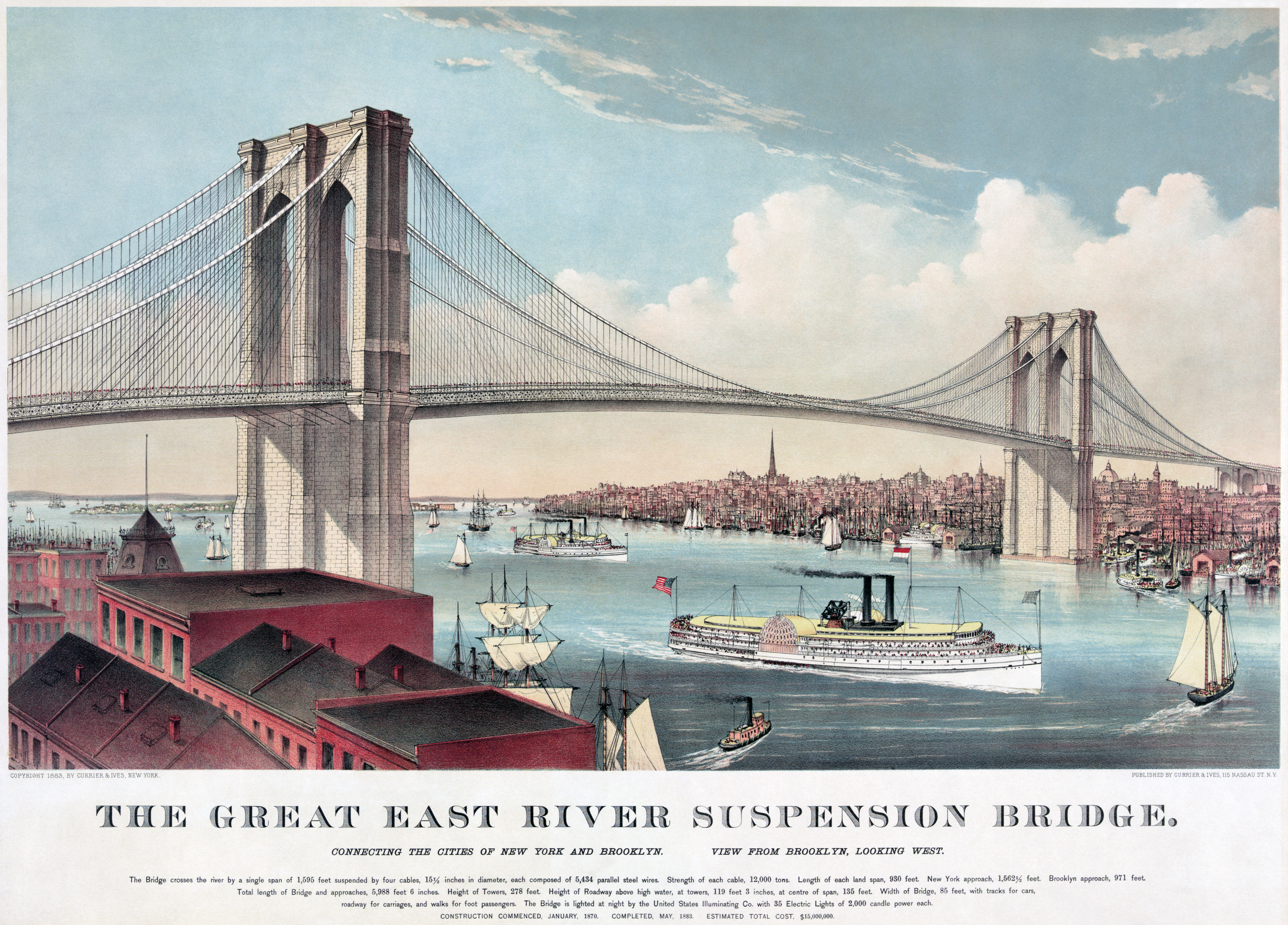
Chromolithograph of the "Great East River Suspension Bridge" by Currier and Ives, created in 1883.

Building the bridge took 14 years: from 1869 until it was opened on May 24, 1883. As part of its construction, two "caissons" were created, immense underwater structures filled with compressed air, which allowed for the construction of the two towers. The towers, when completed, were the tallest structures in North America, taller than anything in New York City itself.

The technology for the caissons and many other aspects of the bridge were new, or new for the enormous scale of the bridge. As such, thousands of engineering documents were produced to document every phase of the construction. This included hundreds of schematics of equipment, machinery, and components that were custom-made for the project, and in many cases the first of its kind. Most of the documents, all hand-drawn, are signed, and represent the work of 64 different draftsmen and assistant engineers, most of whom were young. The average age of the engineers was 31.

Roughly 500 of the drawings are signed by Washington Roebling, who became the head engineer after his father John died as a result of a freak accident in 1869. Washington Roebling himself nearly died in a fire while working in the caissons and in 1872 became virtually incapacitated by the long term effect of "caisson disease", aka "the bends". He completed the project in absentia with the help of his wife Emily Warren Roebling, from an apartment in Columbia Heights near the work site, from which he continued to produce architectural drawings and plans.

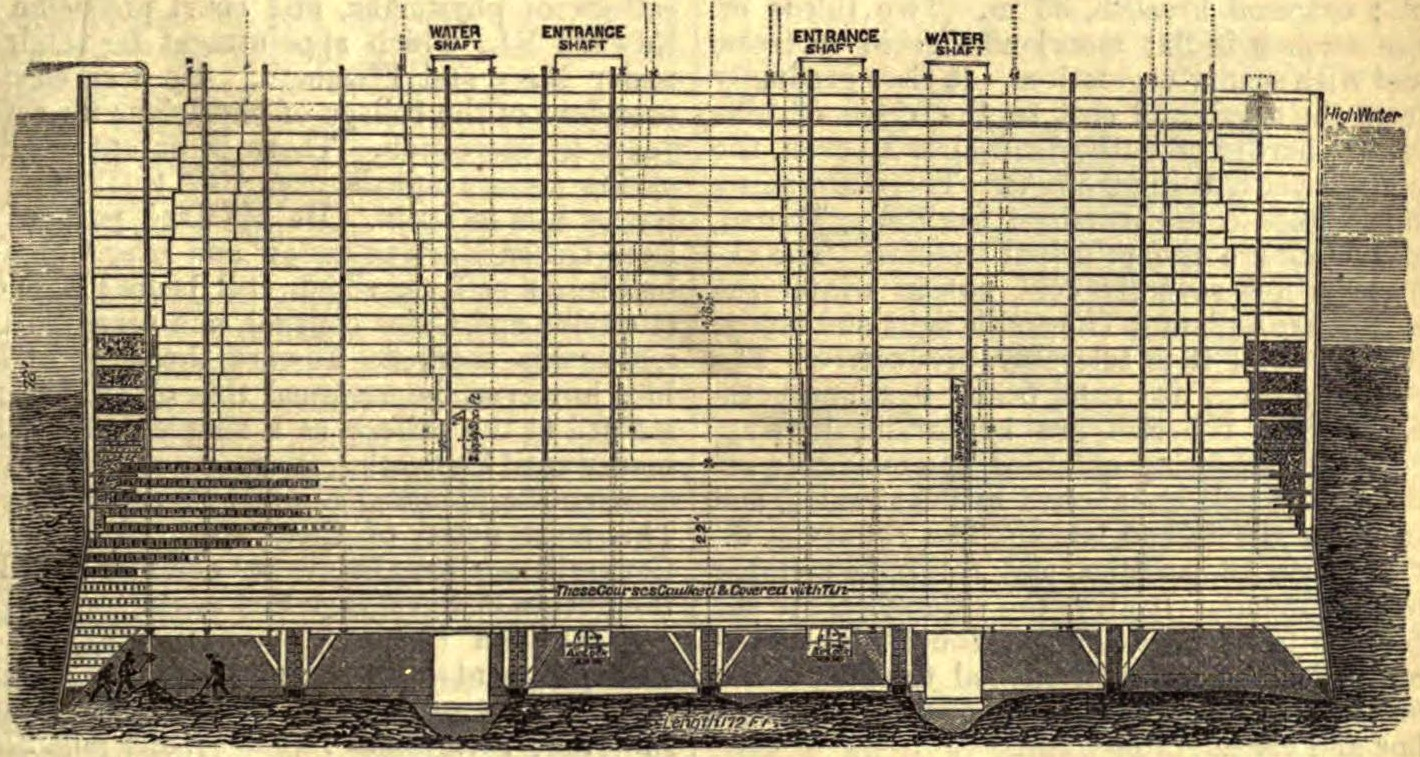
Diagram of a caisson, 1879

== Discovery of the documents ==
Nearly 100 years after the bridge was built, in 1967, a city engineer named Frank Valentine came to a city carpentery shop on Kent Avenue underneath the Williamsburg Bridge, to look for original drawings of an item that was needed for repair work. While going through the prints stored there, he accidentally came across the entire collection of the Brooklyn Bridge drawings, which until that time were not considered to be of great consequence, and at one point had even been ordered to be destroyed, to save space. The documents were stored in huge wooden file drawers as well as piled in rolls, all with an accumulation of decades of dust and dirt. Most of them were done on linen and heavy paper with canvas backing. They include detailed plans and images of components of the bridge and the equipment used, to include cable-making equipment, boiler houses, compressors, hoisting apparatus, elevation, depth, cables, piers, drainage, masonry, tram lines, railroad lines, and pedestrian walkways.

Valentine reported the find to his immediate supervisor, who encouraged him to keep sorting through them, but it was not until the mid 1970s that the value of the drawings was appreciated. In an article in 1975, The New York Times described the documents as a "scientific bonanza, a remarkable testimony to the master bridge builder." The Transportation Administrator of the time, Michael Lazar, stated "The drawings are priceless works of art that must be preserved." In 1992 historian David McCullough stated that any complete record of an engineering feat of that day would be a major find, but the Brooklyn Bridge drawings are especially valuable for their artistic quality. "If there were 140 rivets in a connection, every rivet was drawn, and every one showing how the light would strike it. In drawings such as those of the caissons, each bolt and brace is shown; even the grain of the wood is rendered meticulously in watercolors."

In May 1976, an exhibit of 64 of the drawings was put on at the Whitney Museum of Art. The New York Times described the drawings as "stunning, both from a purely visual standpoint —they are masterpieces of draftsmanship—and as examples of meticulous 19th‐century engineering." Interest in the collection grew, and the holdings were eventually taken over by the New York City Municipal Archives, where they are now housed.

== See also ==
- Brooklyn Bridge
- John A. Roebling
- Washington Roebling
- Emily Warren Roebling

== Sources ==
- McCullough, David. Brave Companions: Portraits in History, Chapter 7, "The Builders", and Chapter 8, "The Treasure from the Carpentry Shop", New York: Simon & Schuster, 1992, ISBN 0-671-79276-8.
