= Donald Roebling =

American philanthropist, engineer, industrial designer, and inventor (1908–1959)

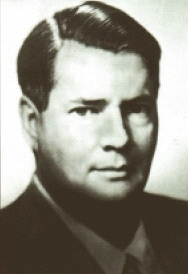
- Born: November 15, 1908; New York City, U.S.
- Died: August 29, 1959 (aged 50); Boston, Massachusetts, U.S.
- Occupations: Inventor, engineer, philanthropist
- Known for: Invention of the amtrac in 1937

Donald Roebling (November 15, 1908 – August 29, 1959) was an eccentric twentieth-century American philanthropist, engineer, industrial designer, and inventor.

He was the great-grandson of John A. Roebling, who began the design of the Brooklyn Bridge, and the grandson of Colonel Washington A. Roebling and Emily Warren Roebling, who together completed the design and supervised its construction. His father was John A. Roebling II.

== History ==
Born in New York City, Roebling grew up in his family's Boulderwood Mansion in Bernardsville, New Jersey.

Roebling built Spottiswoode (the Donald Roebling Estate) in Clearwater, Florida, in 1929. The estate and its buildings were added to the National Register of Historic Places in Pinellas County in 1979.

Roebling died in Boston on August 29, 1959, following complications of an earlier gall bladder operation.

=== Science and invention ===
Roebling had an interest in science, and sponsored Paul Bartsch's 1937 Smithsonian marine research expedition. He was also involved in the establishment of the Archbold Biological Station.

He is most famous for inventing the amtrac in 1937, which he originally intended to be a hurricane rescue device. The United States Navy awarded Roebling a Certificate of Achievement in recognition of "exceptional accomplishment" for his invention, dubbed the Roebling Alligator. In 1948, he received the Medal of Merit from President Harry S. Truman, "for exceptionally meritorious conduct in the performance of outstanding service to the United States."

== See also ==
- American inventors
- 20th-century American engineers
