= John A. Roebling II =

American civil engineer and philanthropist (1867-1952)

- Born: John Augustus Roebling II; November 21, 1867; Mühlhausen, Province of Saxony, Kingdom of Prussia
- Died: February 22, 1952 (aged 84); Bernardsville, New Jersey, US
- Education: Rensselaer Polytechnic Institute
- Spouse(s): Margaret Shippen McIlvaine (m. 1889; died 1930) Helen Price (m. 1931)
- Children: Donald Roebling
- Parent(s): Washington Roebling; Emily Warren Roebling

John Augustus Roebling II (November 21, 1867 – February 2, 1952) was an American civil engineer and philanthropist. Following his father's death, he became the largest individual shareholder in the family business, John A. Roebling's Sons.

== Early life and education ==
Roebling was born to Washington Roebling and Emily Warren Roebling on November 21, 1867, in Mühlhausen, Province of Saxony, Kingdom of Prussia where his father had been sent to study the use of caissons that were to be used in the construction of the foundations of the Brooklyn Bridge. He was named for his grandfather, the original designer of the bridge. Raised in the Columbia Heights, Brooklyn, neighborhood, where his parents were supervising the construction of the bridge, Roebling attended Collegiate School and Brooklyn Boy's Preparatory School. After the bridge was completed, he moved with his family to Troy, New York, where he attended Rensselaer Polytechnic Institute, earning an undergraduate degree in civil engineering in 1888 before a master's degree in chemistry.

== Career ==
He started work as a chemist for the family business, but was forced to decrease his work due to a lingering heart condition that had affected him since his youth. Following his marriage to Margaret Shippen McIlvane in 1889, they moved to Oracle, Arizona, and later Asheville, North Carolina, where the weather was more conducive to her lung ailment. He moved to Bernardsville, New Jersey, in 1904 and acquired the Boulderwood estate after Asheville voted in favor of alcohol prohibition. He continued to work independently on chemistry research and became the owner of 18.4% of the family business, John A. Roebling's Sons, after his father's death in 1926. He acquired 1,050 acres (420 ha) of land in Lake Placid, Florida, in the late 1920s, which became the site of the Red Hill Estate, constructed on Red Hill, which rose 213 feet (65 m). A storehouse, constructed to store supplies, was used by his son, Donald Roebling, to develop and test his amtrac, which was planned to help rescue people during hurricanes, but became the basis of the amphibious Landing Vehicle Tracked used during World War II.

== Philanthropy ==
Boulderwood is part of the Olcott Avenue Historic District, and Roebling was credited with creating work for needy locals during the Great Depression. In July 1941, the estate was given to Richard Archbold, a zoologist who used the site to create the Archbold Biological Station. A collection of 16,000 mineral samples, among them many type specimens, along with an endowment of $150,000, was contributed by Roebling to the Smithsonian Institution. The collection was described in the organization's annual report as including "practically every known mineral species".

== Death ==
Roebling died at his Boulderwood estate in Bernardsville on February 2, 1952. He was survived by his son Donald, and by his second wife, Helen Price, whom he had married in 1931.
