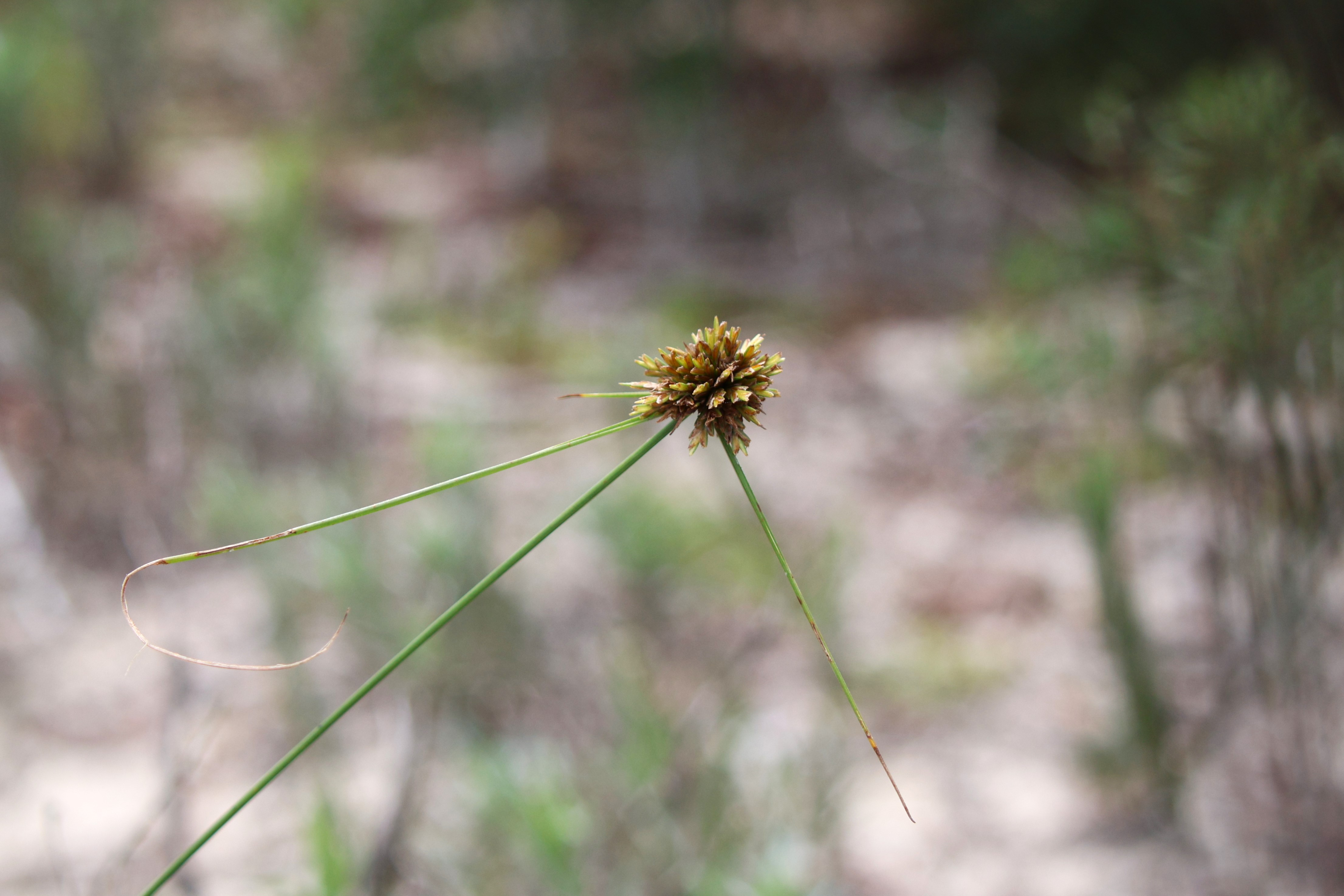
- Growing in scrubby sandhill on upper terrace of Lake Wales Ridge - Red Hill, Archbold Biological Station

Scientific classification
- Kingdom: Plantae
- Clade: Embryophytes
- Clade: Tracheophytes
- Clade: Angiosperms
- Clade: Monocots
- Clade: Commelinids
- Order: Poales
- Family: Cyperaceae
- Genus: Cyperus
- Species: C. filiculmis

Binomial name
- Cyperus filiculmis Vahl

= Cyperus filiculmis =

Species of sedge

Cyperus filiculmis is a species of sedge that is native to southern parts of North America.

The species was first formally described by the botanist Martin Vahl in 1805.

== Distribution and habitat ==
C. filiculmis's range extends from Maryland south to peninsular Florida and westward to Texas.

This species grows in habitats such as fields, forests, and sandy or rocky woodland areas. It has also been observed in longleaf pine-wiregrass flatwoods and sand ridges. It is found primarily in areas with sandy soils and prefers sunny sites.

== See also ==
- List of Cyperus species
