= Fairchild 91 Baby Clipper =

Type of aircraft

Fairchild 91 A-942
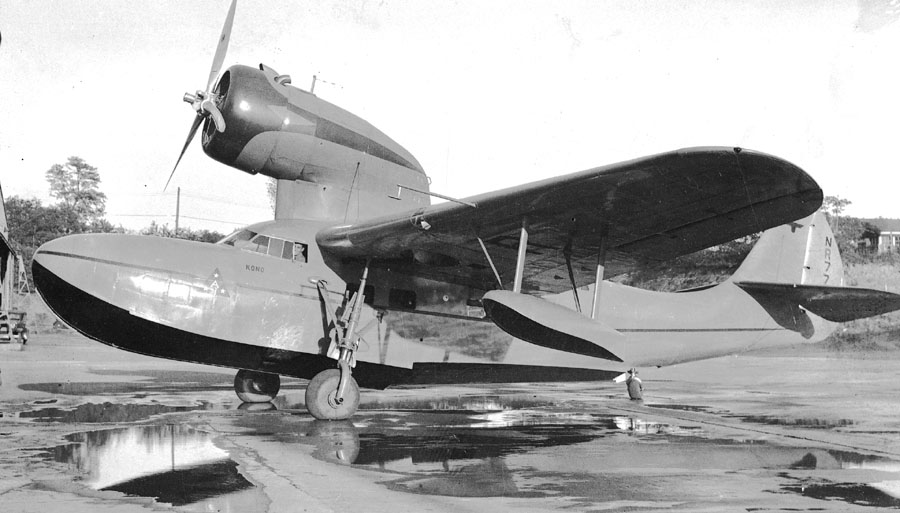
- Fairchild XR-942-B "Kono," belonging to explorer Richard Archbold

General information
- Type: Flying boat airliner
- Manufacturer: Fairchild
- Primary user: Pan Am
- Number built: 7

History
- First flight: 5 April 1935

The Fairchild 91 (a.k.a. A-942) was a single-engine eight-passenger flying boat airliner developed in the United States in the mid-1930s.

== Design ==
Fairchild designed the aircraft in response to a Pan American Airways request for a small flying boat to operate on their river routes along the Amazon and Yangtze. The result was a conventional high-wing cantilever monoplane with its radial engine mounted above the wing in a streamlined nacelle. Before construction of the prototype was complete, however, Pan American no longer required the aircraft to operate in China, and Fairchild optimised the design for the Brazilian tropics.

== Operational history ==
After the first two aircraft were delivered, Pan American cancelled the remaining four aircraft of its order, as they no longer needed any for China, and the two aircraft were capable of handling the Amazon River.

The sole A-942-B was specially built for the American Museum of Natural History and was used by naturalist Richard Archbold on his second expedition to Papua New Guinea in 1936–1937.

The prototype was sold to the Spanish Republican Air Force, but the ship carrying it was captured by the Spanish Nationalists and was used by them until 1941.

The A-942 bought by industrialist Garfield Wood was sold to the British American Ambulance Corps before being transferred to the RAF, who operated it in Egypt for air-sea rescue.

One exampled was sold to the Imperial Japanese Naval Air Service for evaluation, but it was wrecked shortly after delivery, so a second example was purchased to replace it.

== Variants ==
Fairchild 91 Baby Clipper
Initial version built to Pan Am specifications for use on rivers, powered by a 750 hp (560 kW) Pratt & Whitney S2EG Hornet. Six built.
Fairchild A-942-A
Alternative designation for the Fairchild 91
Fairchild 91B Jungle Clipper
Specially equipped for NYC Museum of Natural History, powered by a 760 hp (570 kW) Wright SGR-1820F-52 Cyclone. One built, NR777.
Fairchild A-942-B
Alternative designation for the Fairchild 91B.
Fairchild XSOK-1
Proposed U.S. Navy scout; none built.
Fairchild LXF
Two A-942Bs supplied to the Imperial Japanese Navy Air Service for evaluation.

== Airframes ==
MSN	Registration as built	Delivery Customer	Notes	Refs
9401	NC14743	None - Prototype	to Spanish Aviación Nacional as 63-1 Virgen de Chamorro, scrapped 1941	
9402	NC14744	Pan Am for Panair do Brasil	PP-PAP, wrecked at Belém, 1941	
9403	NC15952	Pan Am for Panair do Brasil	PP-PAT, scrapped 1945	
9404	NC16359	Imperial Japanese Naval Air Service	designated LXF-1, wrecked Japan, 1937	
9405	NC16690	Gar Wood	to British American Ambulance Corps, then to RAF as HK832	
9406	NC19130	Imperial Japanese Naval Air Service	designated LXF-1, wrecked in Nankin, China, 1939	
9407	NR777	American Museum of Natural History	as Kono (Duck) wrecked during storm in Port Moresby, 1936.	

== Specifications (A-942-A) ==
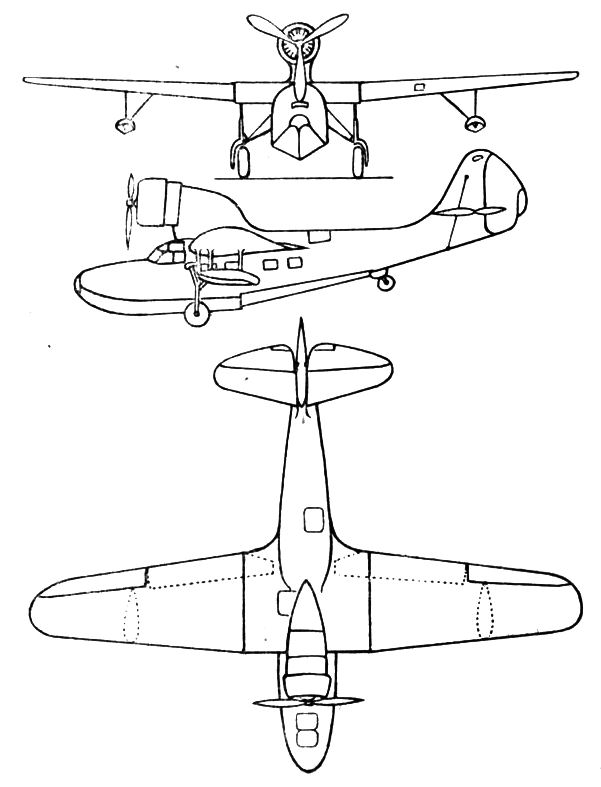
Fairchild A-942 3-view drawing from L'Aerophile May 1936

Data from

General characteristics

- Crew: two pilots
- Capacity: eight passengers
- Length: 46 ft 8 in (14.22 m)
- Wingspan: 56 ft 0 in (17.07 m)
- Height: 14 ft 8 in (4.47 m)
- Wing area: 483 sq ft (44.9 m^{2})
- Empty weight: 6,596 lb (2,992 kg)
- Gross weight: 10,500 lb (4,763 kg)
- Powerplant: 1 × Pratt & Whitney R-1690 , 800 hp (600 kW)

Performance

- Maximum speed: 167 mph (269 km/h, 145 kn)
- Range: 665 mi (1,070 km, 578 nmi)
- Service ceiling: 15,600 ft (4,800 m)
- Rate of climb: 840 ft/min (4.3 m/s)

== See also ==
Aircraft of comparable role, configuration, and era

- Fleetwings Sea Bird
- Beriev Be-8

Related lists

- List of flying boats and floatplanes
