= Richard Archbold =

American zoologist (1907–1976)

- Born: April 9, 1907
- Died: August 1, 1976 (aged 69)
- Education: Columbia University
- Occupations: Zoologist and philanthropist

Richard Archbold (April 9, 1907 – August 1, 1976) was an American zoologist and philanthropist. He was independently wealthy, being the grandson of the capitalist John Dustin Archbold. He was educated at private schools and later attended classes at Columbia University though he never graduated. He used his share of his family's wealth first to sponsor a series of biological expeditions to New Guinea for the American Museum of Natural History, and later to establish, maintain, and endow a biological research station in Florida. In 1929, Archbold joined the ranks of members of the Explorers Club in New York.

== Madagascar expedition ==
In 1928 Archbold was invited to participate in a Franco-British-American zoological expedition to Madagascar (1929–1931), led by Jean Delacour, on which he was responsible for mammal collecting. The American component of this expedition was funded by his father, John F. Archbold, with the proviso that his son be included. It was on this expedition that Archbold first met Austin L. Rand, the expedition ornithologist, who became a long-term research collaborator and lifelong friend. It was also during this expedition that he learned of the death of his father.

== New Guinea expeditions ==
In the 1930s, inspired and encouraged by Ernst Mayr, Archbold financed (and personally led the first three of) a series of major biological expeditions to New Guinea. In these expeditions, the principal zoologist (and often co-leader) was Austin Rand, and the principal botanist Leonard Brass.

=== 1933–34 expedition ===
The first Archbold expedition to New Guinea took place in south-eastern New Guinea, covering an altitude range from sea level to alpine tundra. This used conventional equipment, pack animals and human carriers. Logistical problems and limitations started Archbold thinking about the use of aircraft for future expeditions, as well as radio for communications.

=== 1936–37 expedition ===
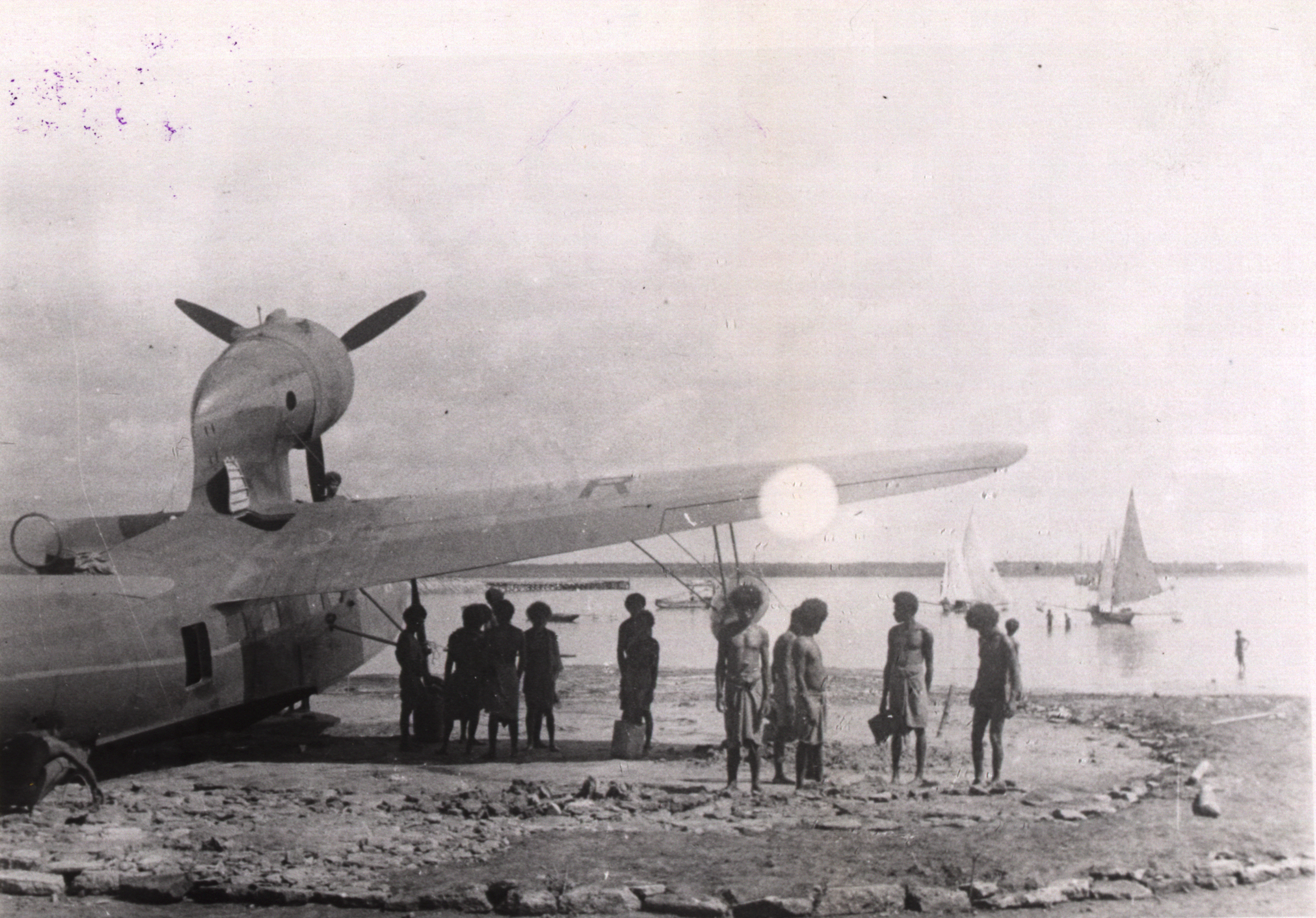
Fairchild 91 (NR777, "Kono") near Daru, on the second expedition

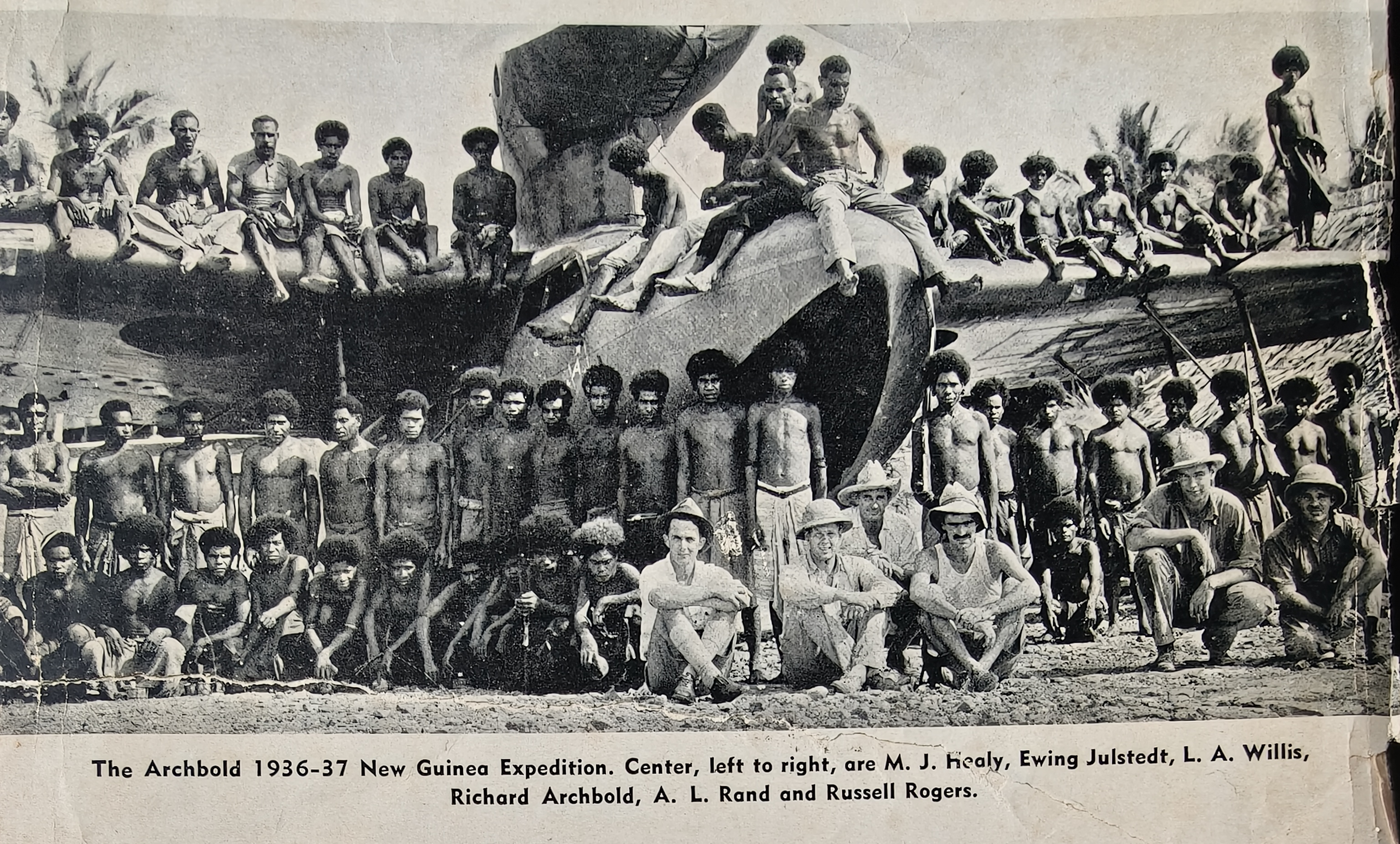
The Archbold 1936-1937 New Guinea Expedition

The second Archbold expedition to New Guinea took place from February 1936 to January 1937 in southern New Guinea, chiefly at and near Daru, along the Fly and Palmer Rivers, and in the Wassi Kussa area. The expedition used radio as well as a Fairchild 91 amphibian flying boat; however, the loss of the aircraft at anchor at Port Moresby during a tropical storm limited the amount of work done.

=== 1938–39 expedition ===
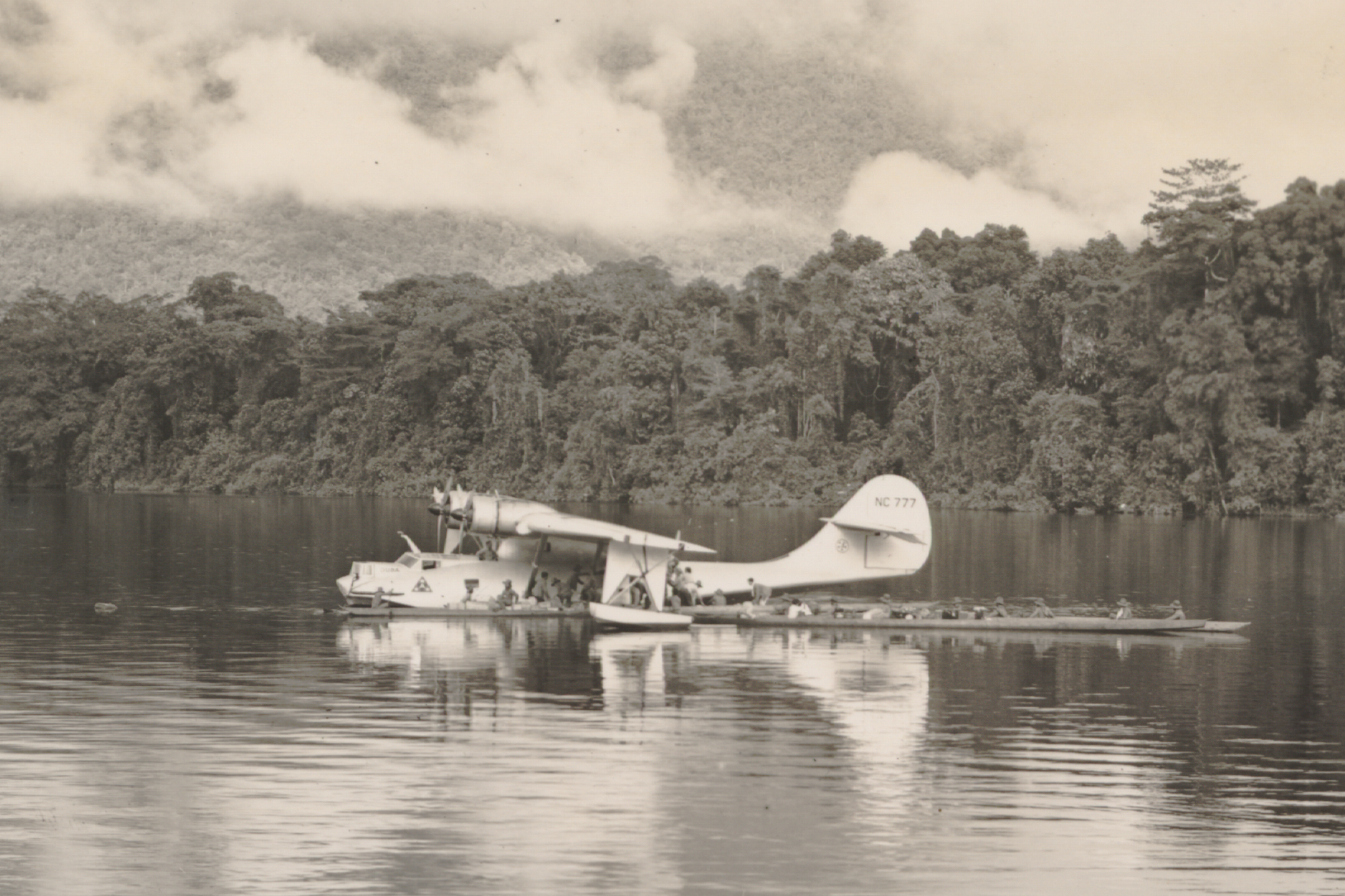
PBY Catalina NC777 "Guba II" on the Mamberamo River, on the third expedition

The third and most ambitious Archbold expedition to New Guinea took place from April 1938 to May 1939 in Netherlands New Guinea, concentrating on the north slope of the Snow Mountains, from Mt Wilhelmina to the Idenburg River (a tributary of the Mamberamo River), making collections at altitudes from near sea-level to over 4,000 m at the upper limit of vegetation.

Piloted by Russell R. Rogers, the expedition used a PBY-1 Catalina flying boat (named Guba II), that could land on suitable lakes and rivers, to provide supplies to the expedition, as well as performing other duties such as aerial reconnaissance and photography. It was through an aerial reconnaissance flight early in the expedition that the discovery was made, on 23 June 1938, of the hitherto unknown, though densely populated, Baliem Valley, home to the Dani people. A Dutch soldier on board the Guba named the valley Groote Vallei, or Grand Valley, and Archbold declared that would be its name.

In August 1938, Archbold dispatched two exploration teams, each consisting of Dutch soldiers, convicts, and Dayak porters, into the Baliem Valley. One team led by Captain C.G.J. Teerink started at one end of the valley, while the other, led by Lieutenant J.E.M. Van Arcken, started at the other end with the goal of meeting in the middle of the valley. On August 10, 1938, an incident occurred near the valley's center resulting in the death of a Dani tribesman.

=== Pioneer flight over the Indian Ocean ===
Towards the conclusion of the expedition in 1939, with Archbold intending to return to the USA across the Pacific, he was contacted by Captain P.G. Taylor, representing Australian interests which, with war impending, wanted to determine the practicality of an air route from Australia to Europe over the Indian Ocean and via Africa rather than Asia. It appeared that Guba II was the only suitable aircraft for the job at short notice. As Archbold was amenable to the project, his aircraft was effectively chartered for the crossing by the Australian government (which paid for fuel and other provisions used during the flight) and his flying crew was augmented by Taylor as navigator.

The intended flight path across the Indian Ocean was from Port Hedland, Western Australia to the Cocos (Keeling) Islands, Diego Garcia, the Seychelles, and Mombasa, Kenya. Apart from the initial leg of the flight, when the plane was forced, after leaving Port Hedland, to detour via Batavia (now Jakarta) because of bad weather, the flight was made without major problems. In Mombasa, Taylor left the crew to return to Australia and Archbold continued the flight westwards, landing in New York City in July 1939.

== Archbold Biological Station ==
With the outbreak of war in the Pacific, the series of expeditions to New Guinea came to a halt, and in 1941 Archbold established the Archbold Biological Station at Lake Placid, Florida, where he lived the rest of his life. The station was established on land donated by John A. Roebling II. There were four further Archbold-financed expeditions to New Guinea after the war, but Archbold did not personally participate in them.
