= Capstan equation =

Formula relating load-force and hold-force on a line wound around a cylinder

A flexible line wrapped around a cylinder that is subject to a holding tension can achieve a greater loading tension due to the effect of friction.

Schematic of quantities for capstan equation

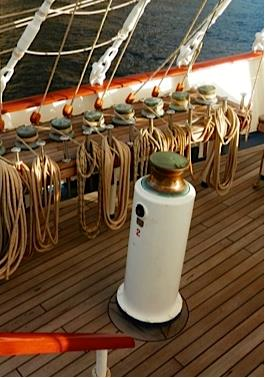
An example of holding capstans and a powered capstan used to raise sails on a tall ship

The capstan equation or belt friction equation, also known as the Euler–Eytelwein formula describes the tension required to cause slippage of a flexible line (such as a rope, wire rope, or a belt) that is wound around a cylinder and tensioned on its opposite side. Flexible lines tensioned on curved surfaces create normal forces and corresponding friction forces, resulting in a greater load required to cause slip than the load holding it taut. The capstan equation applies to multiple rope windings around the circumference of the cylinder and for fractions of one revolution, as is the case in applications such as rope drives or band brakes. It also applies to both static cylinders, such as bollards and capstans, and dynamic cylinders that can rotate, such as pulleys and winches. There are multiple applications, especially in marine operations, where the effects are used to multiply human pulling capacity, such as the tensioning of rigging used for sails, and in the mooring of vessels. In mechanical systems, friction between belts and rotating pulleys also enables greater torque to be transmitted, especially in pre-tensioned systems that increase traction and grip.

== Physics ==
For a cable that is wound around a cylinder with friction present, a small holding force exerted on one side achieves a larger loading force on the other side before slipping.

The capstan equation describes the magnitude of the loading force causing slip, as a function of the holding force:
$$T_\text{load} = T_\text{hold} \, e^{\mu\varphi},$$
where

$T_\text{load}$ is the force required to be applied to create slip,
$T_\text{hold}$ is the force applied to the other end of the cable,
$\mu$ is the static or dynamic coefficient of friction between the rope and capstan materials,
$\varphi$ is the total angle swept by all turns of the rope, measured in radians (i.e., with one full turn the angle $\varphi = 2\pi$).

The tension in the cable increases from the holding side to the loading side over the angle of wrap. The cylinder applies varying, distributed normal forces on the cable, causing corresponding friction forces (according to Amonton's first law of friction) to act on the cable circumferentially towards the end with lower tension.

It can be observed that the resistance to slip increases exponentially with the coefficient of friction, the number of turns around the cylinder, and the angle of contact. The force gain is independent of the radius of the cylinder.

In a generalized form, the cable does not slip on the cylinder if the ratio of the two tensions lies within this range:
$$e^{-\mu\varphi} \leq \frac{T_2}{T_1} \leq e^{\mu\varphi}.$$
When the tension ratio lies outside this range, the cumulative friction force is overcome, and the cable will accelerate and slip relative to the cylinder.

The cylinder must generate a reaction force to counteract the net load imposed by the rope tensions, preventing any translation of the cylinder.

For static applications, a reaction torque acts on the cylinder about its center to prevent it from rotating.

For dynamic applications (such as belt pulleys or brakes) where the cylinder can rotate, if the tension ratio does not cause slip, then the cable grips the cylinder and subjects it to torque and angular acceleration. This torque is caused by the force difference between $T_1$ and $T_2$ acting at a radius from the centre of rotation:
$$F = T_1 - T_2.$$

=== Comparison with frictionless cylinder ===
A cable wound around a frictionless cylinder (such as a frictionless Atwood machine) subject to tension on one side, will result in equal tension on the other side, provided the system is in equilibrium. When tensions of different magnitudes are applied to each end of the cable, this results in a net acceleration of the cable in the direction of the tension with the greater magnitude and slip of the cable relative to the frictionless cylinder.

== History ==
Euler first published Remarques sur l'effet du frottement dans l'équilibre (Remarks on the effect of friction in equilibrium) in Memoirs of the Berlin Academy of Science in 1769. Eytelwein later built on this work by publishing Handbuch der Statik fester Körper: mit vorzüglicher Rücksicht auf ihre Anwendung in der Architektur in 1808.

== Boundary conditions ==
Several conditions must be true for the capstan equation to be valid:

1. The cable is effectively inextensible or inelastic in its longitudinal direction,
2. The line is not flexurally rigid, in which case significant force would be lost in the bending of the line tightly around the cylinder. (The equation must be modified for this case.) For instance, a Bowden cable is to some extent rigid and does not obey the principles of the capstan equation.

== Applications ==
A holding capstan acts as a ratchet-like device that can turn only in one direction; once a load is pulled into place in that direction, it can be held with a much smaller force. A powered capstan, also called a winch, rotates so that the applied tension is multiplied by the friction between rope and capstan. On a tall ship a holding capstan and a powered capstan are used in tandem so that a small force can be used to raise a heavy sail and then the rope can be easily removed from the powered capstan and tied off.

In rock climbing this effect allows a lighter person to hold (belay) a heavier person when top-roping, and also produces rope drag during lead climbing.

Bulk material handling conveyor belts rely on the friction between the belt and driven pulley to provide sufficient traction; conveyor design engineers use the capstan equation to verify there is no undesired slip especially during starting and stopping. Increasing the pre-tension in the belt (known as the take-up tension) allows for greater drive torque to achieve traction achieving a design margin against slip.

The table below lists values of the factor $e^{ \mu \varphi} \,$ based on the number of turns and coefficient of friction μ.

Number of turns	Coefficient of friction μ						
Number of turns	0.1	0.2	0.3	0.4	0.5	0.6	0.7
0.5	1.4	1.9	2.6	3.5	4.8	6.6	9
1	1.9	3.5	6.6	12	23	43	81
2	3.5	12	43	152	535	1881	6661
3	6.6	43	286	1881	12392	81612	537503
4	12	152	1881	23228	286751	3540026	43702631
5	23	535	12392	286751	6635624	153552935	3553321281

From the table it is evident why one seldom sees a sheet (a rope to the loose side of a sail) wound more than three turns around a winch. The force gain would be extreme besides being counter-productive since there is risk of a riding turn, result being that the sheet will foul, form a knot and not run out when eased (by slacking grip on the tail (free end)).

It is both ancient and modern practice for anchor capstans and jib winches to be slightly flared out at the base, rather than cylindrical, to prevent the rope (anchor warp or sail sheet) from sliding down. The rope wound several times around the winch can slip upwards gradually, with little risk of a riding turn, provided it is tailed (loose end is pulled clear), by hand or a self-tailer.

For instance, the factor of 153,552,935 above (from 5 turns around a capstan with a coefficient of friction of 0.6) means, in theory, that a small child would be capable of holding (but not moving) the weight of two USS Nimitz supercarriers (97,000 tons each, but for the child it would be only a little more than 1 kg). The large number of turns around the capstan combined with such a high friction coefficient mean that very little additional force is necessary to hold such heavy weight in place. The cables necessary to support this weight, as well as the capstan's ability to withstand the crushing force of those cables, are separate considerations.

== Derivation ==
The applied tension $T_\text{load}(\varphi)$ is a function of the total angle subtended by the rope on the capstan. On the verge of slipping, this is also the frictional force, which is by definition $\mu$ times the normal force $R(\varphi)$. By simple geometry, the additional normal force $\delta R(\varphi) = R(\varphi + \delta\varphi) - R(\varphi)$ when increasing the angle by a small angle $\delta\varphi$ is well approximated by $\delta R(\varphi) \approx T_\text{load}(\varphi) \sin(\delta\varphi) \approx T_\text{load}(\varphi) \delta\varphi$. Combining these and considering infinitesimally small $\delta\varphi$ yields the differential equation
$$\frac{dT_\text{load}(\varphi)}{d\varphi} = \mu T_\text{load}(\varphi), \qquad T_\text{load}(0) = T_\text{hold},$$
whose solution is
$$T_\text{load}(\varphi) = T_\text{hold} e^{\mu\varphi}.$$

== Generalizations ==
=== Generalization of the capstan equation for a V-belt ===
The belt friction equation for a V-belt is
$$T_\text{load} = T_\text{hold} e^{\mu\varphi / \sin(\alpha/2)},$$
where $\alpha$ is the angle (in radians) between the two flat sides of the pulley that the V-belt presses against. A flat belt has an effective angle of $\alpha = \pi$.

The material of a V-belt or multi-V serpentine belt tends to wedge into the mating groove in a pulley as the load increases, improving torque transmission.

For the same power transmission, a V-belt requires less tension than a flat belt, increasing bearing life.

=== Generalization of the capstan equation for a rope lying on an arbitrary orthotropic surface ===
If a rope is lying in equilibrium under tangential forces on a rough orthotropic surface, then all three following conditions are satisfied:

1. No separation – normal reaction $N$ is positive for all points of the rope curve:
  $N = -k_nT > 0$, where $k_n$ is a normal curvature of the rope curve.
2. Dragging coefficient of friction $\mu_g$ and angle $\alpha$ are satisfying the following criteria for all points of the curve
  $$-\mu_g < \tan \alpha < +\mu_g.$$
3. Limit values of the tangential forces:
  The forces at both ends of the rope $T$ and $T_0$ are satisfying the inequality
  $$T_0 e^{-\int_s \omega \, ds} \le T \le T_0 e^{\int_s \omega \, ds}$$
  where $\omega = \mu_\tau \sqrt{k_n^2 - \frac{k_g^2}{\mu_g^2}} = \mu_\tau k \sqrt{\cos^2 \alpha - \frac{\sin^2 \alpha}{\mu_g^2}},$ $k_g$ is a geodesic curvature of the rope curve, $k$ is a curvature of a rope curve, $\mu_\tau$ is a coefficient of friction in the tangential direction.
  If $\omega$ is constant, then
  $$T_0 e^{-\mu_\tau ks \sqrt{\cos^2 \alpha - \sin^2 \alpha/\mu_g^2}} \le T \le T_0 e^{\mu_\tau ks \sqrt{\cos^2 \alpha - \sin^2 \alpha/\mu_g^2}}.$$

This generalization has been obtained by Konyukhov.

== See also ==
- Belt friction
- Frictional contact mechanics
- Torque amplifier, a device that exploits the capstan effect to amplify the torque of a rotating shaft
