= Washington A. Roebling II =

American businessman (1881–1912)

Washington Augustus Roebling II
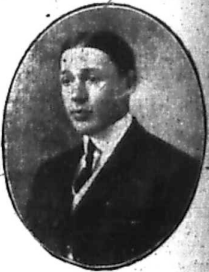
- Portrait of Washington Roebling II
- Born: March 25, 1881; Trenton, New Jersey, US
- Died: April 15, 1912 (aged 31); North Atlantic Ocean
- Occupation: Businessman
- Relatives: John A. Roebling (grandfather); Washington Roebling (uncle)

Washington Augustus Roebling II (March 25, 1881 – April 15, 1912) was an American businessman and early automobile manufacturer who perished in the sinking of RMS Titanic.

== Early life and education ==
Born in Trenton, New Jersey, in 1881 into the prominent Roebling family of American Industrialists, to Charles (1849–1918) Roebling and Sarah Mahon Ormsby (1856–1887), he was named after his famous uncle, the Civil War officer and supervising engineer for the construction of the Brooklyn Bridge, Washington Roebling. He attended the elite Hill School in Pottstown, Pennsylvania, where he was an adept football player. After working with his father in the family business, John A. Roebling Sons Company, he began working with the Walter Automotive Company as its secretary.

== Automotive career ==
In 1909, Washington Roebling II arranged to take over the Walter Automobile Company from William Walter because of its mounting financial issues. The company was moved to an abandoned brewery owned by the Kuser family in Hamilton, New Jersey, outside of Trenton. Washington Roebling II's father, Ferdinand Roebling was made president, John Louis Kuser, the twin brother of prominent New Jersey businessman Anthony R. Kuser was made secretary-treasurer, and Washington was made general manager of the new enterprise, Mercer Automobile Company.

The company marketed itself to the high end and racing markets. He worked with noted French auto designer Etienne Planche, designing the Roebling-Planche Racing Car which performed well in auto races of the time. Roebling tested all Mercer Models before they entered market, and participated in racing. He finished second at the Savannah Trophy Race for Light Cars in November 1911.

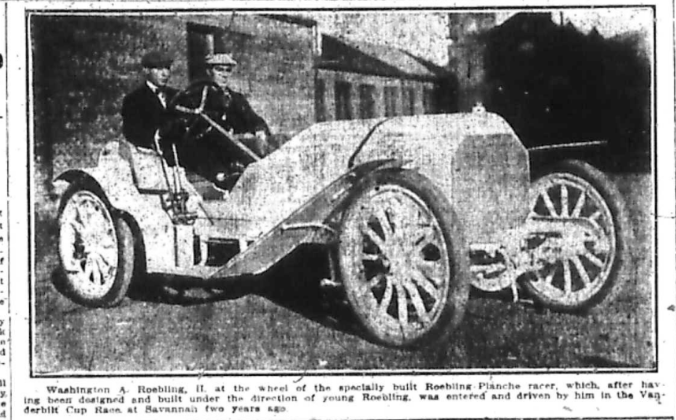
Washington A. Roebling II at wheel of Roebling Planche Racer Circa 1910

== Titanic ==
In early 1912, he took a long European road trip with his friend and Trenton native, Stephen Weart Blackwell, and chauffeur Frank Stanley in a Mercer Fiat. While touring Italy and France, Blackwell and Roebling met the Bonnell and Wick families, and decided to join them on their return trip to the United States on the new ocean liner RMS Titanic. Because of illness, Frank Stanley stayed behind in Europe with Roebling's car. Both Blackwell and Roebling stayed in first-class accommodations, When the ship struck an iceberg and sank Washington was seen helping the Bonnell and Wick family women into a lifeboat, and telling them reassuredly “you will be back with us on the ship soon”. Blackwell and Roebling's bodies were never found. Because of a miscommunication his Roebling cousins traveled to Halifax believing him to be among the survivors picked up by the RMS Carpathia. The Mercer Motor Company was taken over by outside investors in 1919, going into receivership in 1925 and folding not long after.
