= John A. Roebling =

German-American engineer (1806–1869)

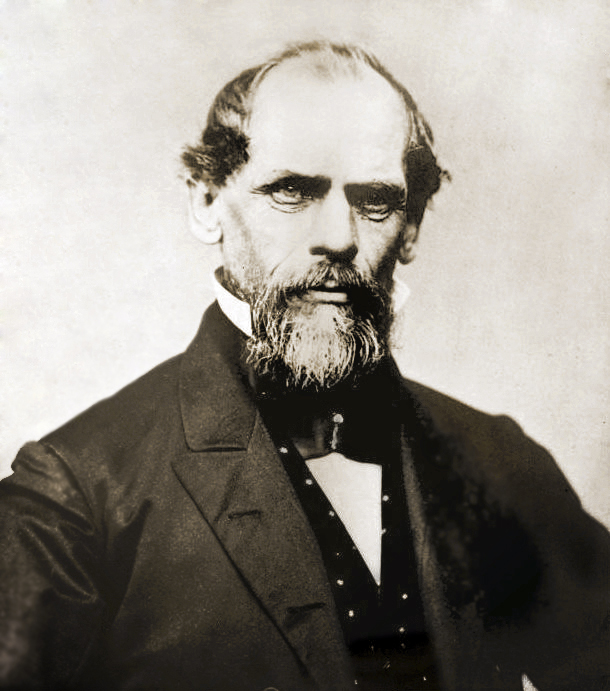
- Roebling, c. 1866
- Born: Johann August Röbling; June 12, 1806; Mühlhausen, Kingdom of Prussia
- Died: July 22, 1869 (aged 63); New York City, U.S.
- Resting place: Riverview Cemetery, Trenton, New Jersey
- Known for: Brooklyn Bridge; John A. Roebling Suspension Bridge
- Spouse: Johanna Herting
- Children: 9, including Washington
- Relatives: Emily Roebling Cadwalader (granddaughter); Washington A. Roebling II (grandson); Donald Roebling (great-grandson); Paul Roebling (great-great-grandson)

John Augustus Roebling (born Johann August Röbling; June 12, 1806 – July 22, 1869) was a German-born American civil engineer. He designed and built wire rope suspension bridges, in particular the Brooklyn Bridge, which has been designated as a National Historic Landmark and a National Historic Civil Engineering Landmark.

== Early life and education ==
Roebling was born June 12, 1806, in Mühlhausen to Friederike Dorothea (née Muelleren) and Christoph Polykarpus Roebling. Recognizing his intelligence at a young age, Roebling's mother arranged for him to be tutored in mathematics and science at Erfurt by Ephraim Salomon Unger. He went to Erfurt when he was 15. In 1824 he passed his Surveyor's examination and returned home for a year.

In 1824 he enrolled for two semesters at the Bauakademie in Berlin, where he studied architecture and engineering under Martin Friedrich Rabe (1765–1856), bridge construction and foundation construction under Johann Friedrich Dietlein (1782–1837), hydraulics under Johann Albert Eytelwein (1764–1848), and languages. Roebling also attended lectures of the philosopher Georg Wilhelm Friedrich Hegel. He developed an interest in natural philosophy, and many years later worked on a 1000-page treatise on his own concepts of the universe.

In 1825, Roebling got a government job in the Arnsberg province and moved to Eslohe, where he worked for four years on designing and supervising construction of military roads. During this period he made sketches for suspension bridges over Ruhr- and Lenne-river, which were never built. In 1829, he returned to his home to work out his final thesis and prepare for his second engineer examination. For unknown reasons, he never took the examination.

== Career ==
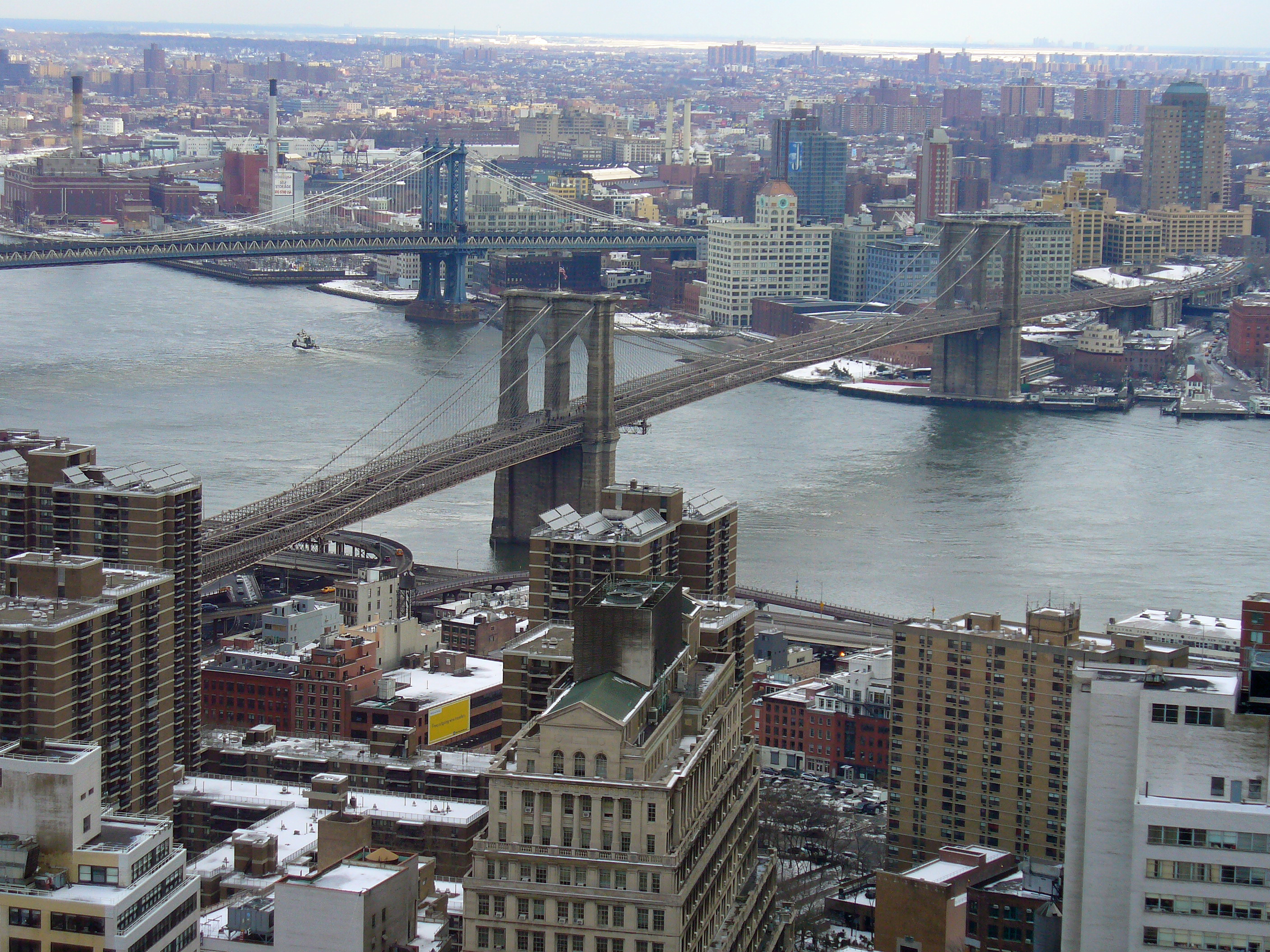
The Brooklyn Bridge in February 2007

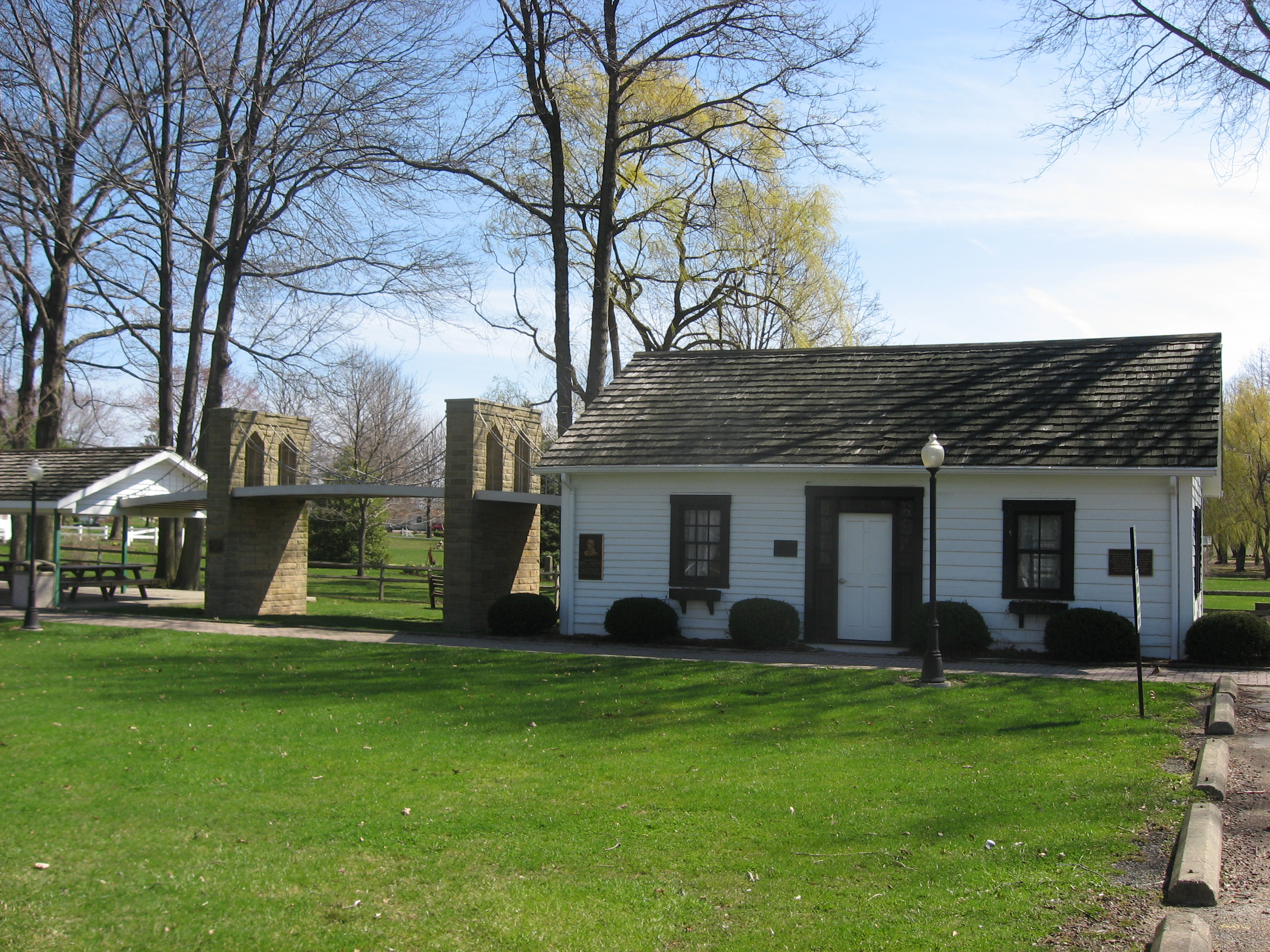
Roebling's Shop in Saxonburg, Pennsylvania, adjacent to a replica of the Brooklyn Bridge

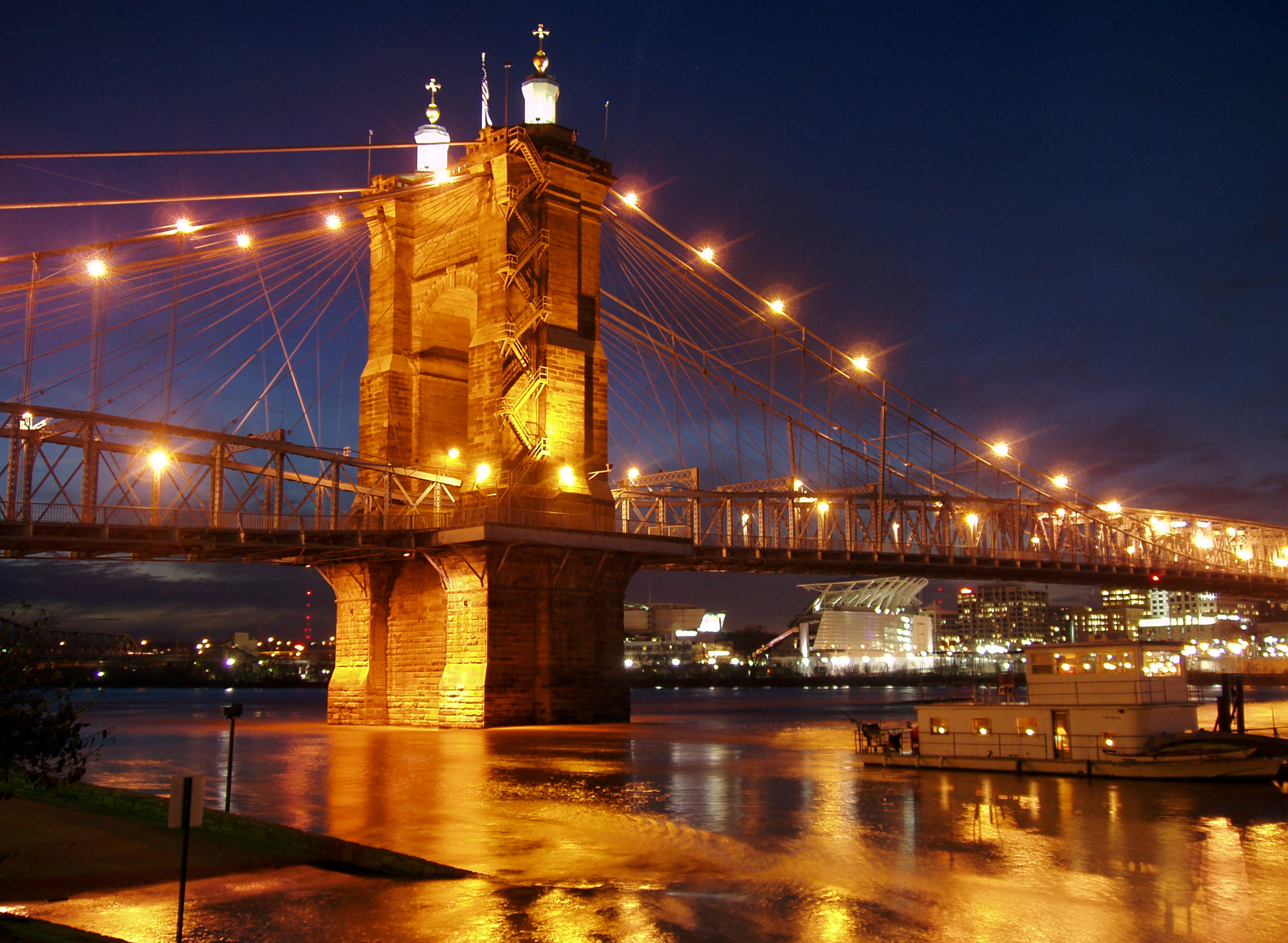
John A. Roebling Suspension Bridge, spanning the Ohio River from Cincinnati to Covington, Kentucky, at night

On May 22, 1831, Roebling left Prussia with a group of emigrants bound for the United States. They included his brother Carl and the older Johann Adolphus Etzler, who believed in a technological utopia. Engineers had difficulty advancing and achieving economic mobility in Prussian society, in part because of the Napoleonic Wars, which had lasted until 1815, and suppressed investment in infrastructure. During this period, Prussia also had considerable political unrest, as authoritarian governments took the places of democratic ones.

Etzler believed that they could create a technological utopia in the United States, but disputes arose among the men en route. The group split up after reaching Pennsylvania. John and Carl Roebling purchased 1,582 acres (640 hectares) of land on October 28, 1831, in Butler County with the intent to establish a German settlement, to be called Saxonburg. Most of the other settlers had remained with Etzler. In 20th-century recognition of his historic importance, the John Roebling House at Saxonburg was listed on the National Register of Historic Places in 1976.

When the Roeblings and others arrived, the United States was in the later stages of an economic boom, which ended in the financial Panic of 1837, reducing everyone's opportunities. Farmers were deeply affected by it as they often depended on credit to produce the next season's crops. But by the 1840s, the economy was improving and many Americans believed in the nation's manifest destiny to extend its borders and achieve greatness on the North American continent. Transportation between eastern industrial hubs and frontier farming markets had become a matter of both national and popular interest.

Many railway and transportation projects were under way near the site which Roebling chose for his colony, but instead of continuing in the engineering profession, he took up farming. After five years he married Johanna Herting, a tailor's daughter. He found agrarian work unsatisfying, and Saxonburg attracted few settlers.

In 1837, after the birth of his first child and the death of his brother Carl, Roebling returned to engineering for work. He first worked on projects to improve river navigation and build canals. For three years, he conducted surveys for the state of Pennsylvania for railway lines across the Allegheny Mountains, from the capital, Harrisburg, to Pittsburgh in the far west, at the start of the Ohio River.

In 1840, Roebling wrote to suspension bridge designer Charles Ellet Jr., offering to help with the design of a bridge near Philadelphia:

The study of suspension bridges formed for the last few years of my residence in Europe my favourite occupation ... Let but a single bridge of the kind be put up in Philadelphia, exhibiting all the beautiful forms of the system to full advantage, and it needs no prophecy to foretell the effect which the novel and useful features will produce upon the intelligent minds of the Americans.

At that time, canal boats from Philadelphia were transported over the Allegheny Mountains on railroad cars in order to access waterways on the other side of the mountains, so that the boats could continue to Pittsburgh. The system of inclines and levels that moved the boats and conventional railroad cars was a state-owned enterprise, the Allegheny Portage Railroad. The railroad cars were pulled up and down the inclines by a long loop of thick hemp rope, up to 7 centimetres thick. The hemp ropes were expensive and had to be replaced frequently.

Roebling remembered an article he had read about wire rope. Soon after, he started developing a seven-strand wire rope at a ropewalk that he built on his farm. In 1841, Roebling began producing wire rope at Saxonburg to use in suspension bridges and such projects as the portage railroad.

In 1844 Roebling won a bid to replace the wooden canal aqueduct across the Allegheny River with the Allegheny Aqueduct. His design encompassed seven spans of 163 feet (50 m), each consisting of a wooden trunk to hold the water, supported by a continuous cable made of many parallel wires, wrapped tightly together, on each side of the trunk. He followed this innovation in 1845 by building a suspension bridge over the Monongahela River at Pittsburgh. The confluence of the Allegheny and Monongahela rivers at Pittsburgh forms the Ohio River.

In 1848, Roebling undertook the construction of four suspension aqueducts on the Delaware and Hudson Canal. During this period, he moved to Trenton, New Jersey. In Trenton, Roebling built a large industrial complex for wire production for his growing company: John A. Roebling's Sons Company. This complex inspired Trenton's motto that appears on the Lower Trenton Bridge: "Trenton Makes, the World Takes".

Roebling's next project, starting in 1851, was a railroad bridge connecting the New York Central and Great Western Railway of Ontario, Canada over the Niagara River. Construction took four years. The bridge, with a clear span of 825 feet (251 m), was supported by four, ten-inch (25 cm) wire cables, and had two levels, one for vehicles and one for rail traffic.

While the Niagara bridge was being built, Roebling designed a railway suspension bridge across the Kentucky River, which required a clear span of 1,224 feet (373 m). The anchorage and stone towers were completed, and the cable wire delivered along with the material for the superstructure, when the railway company became insolvent. The bridge construction was halted and he was never able to complete it.

What is now known as the High Bridge was later completed as the first cantilever bridge in the US, with a truss for carrying the railway track. A second version was built on the same foundations in 1911. The highest railroad bridge over a navigable river in the United States, the bridge is still in use.

In 1859 Roebling completed another suspension bridge at Pittsburgh over the Allegheny River. Its total length was 1,030 feet (314m), consisting of two main spans of 344 feet (105m) each, and two side spans of 171 feet (52m) each. His son Washington Roebling worked with him on that project, having completed his engineering degree.

The American Civil War brought a temporary halt to Roebling's work, as resources were diverted to the war effort. In 1863 building resumed on a bridge over the Ohio River at Cincinnati, which Roebling had started in 1856 and halted due to lack of financing. He finished this bridge in 1867. The Cincinnati-Covington Bridge, later named the John A. Roebling Suspension Bridge in his honor, was the world's longest suspension bridge, with a main span of 1,057 feet (322 m), at the time it was finished.

== Death ==
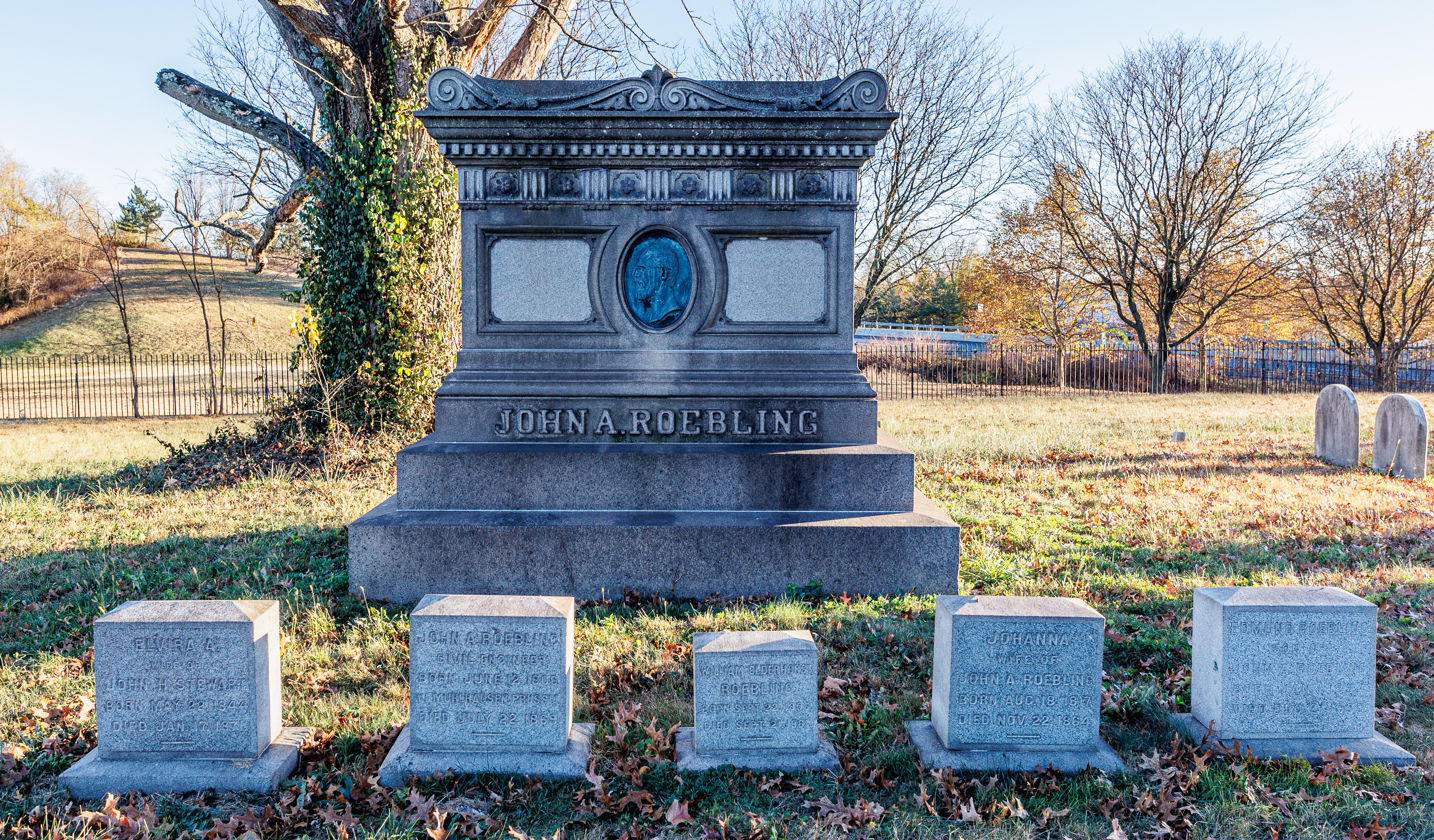
The Roebling family plot in Riverview Cemetery

In 1867, Roebling started design work on what is now called the Brooklyn Bridge, spanning the East River in New York. On June 28, 1869, at Fulton Ferry, while he was standing at the edge of a dock, working on fixing the location where the bridge would be built, his foot was crushed by an arriving ferry. His injured toes were amputated. He refused further medical treatment and wanted to cure his foot by "water therapy" (continuous pouring of water over the wound). His condition deteriorated. He died on July 22, 1869, of tetanus at the home of his son on Hicks Street, in Brooklyn Heights. It was 24 days after the accident. His son Washington Roebling was later named chief engineer of the project, but due to his further incapacity to work after suffering from 'the bends' while in a caisson on the river bed, his wife Emily Warren Roebling took over the project and completed it in 1883. John Roebling is buried in the Riverview Cemetery in Trenton, New Jersey.

== Legacy ==
Legacy

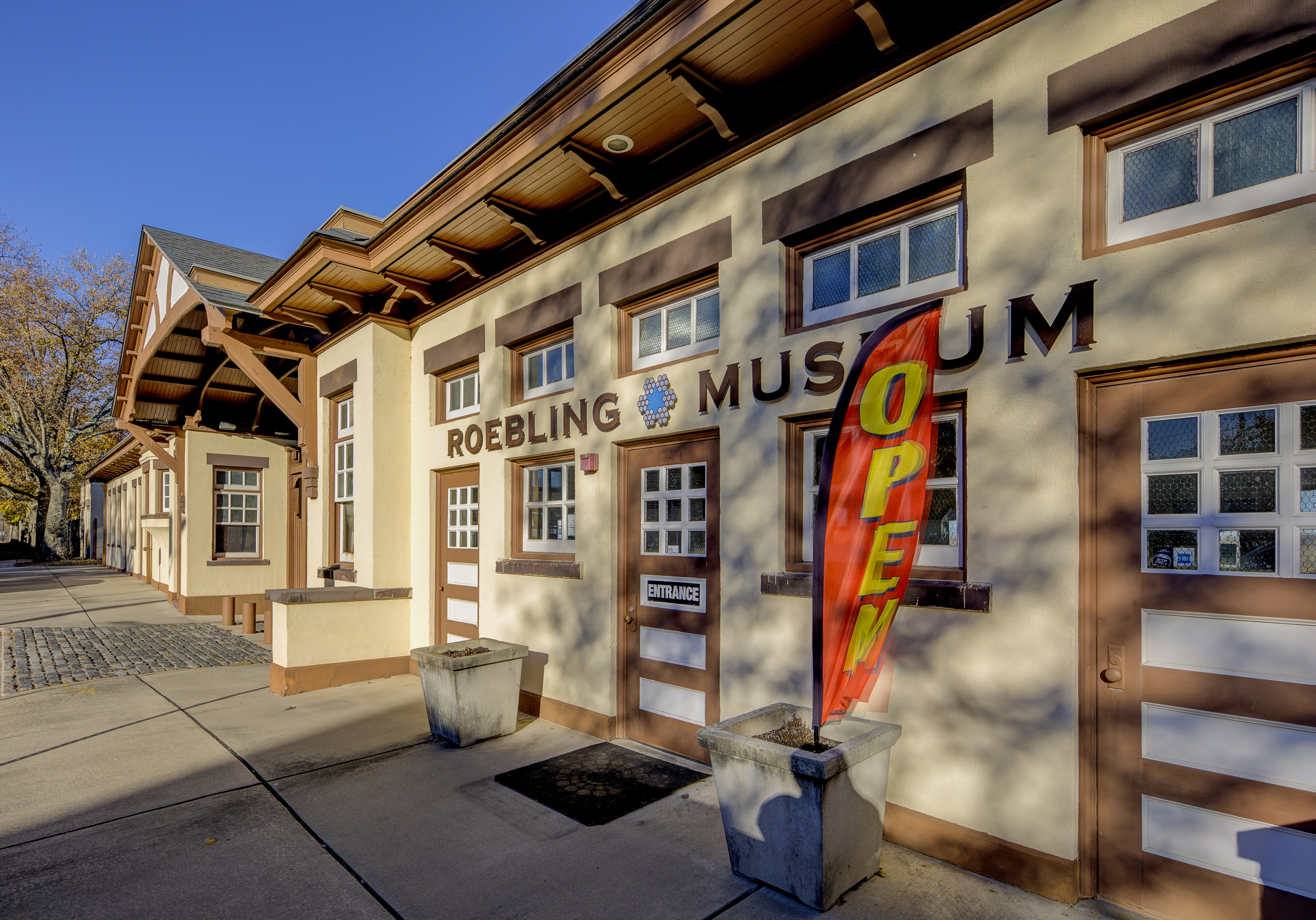
The Roebling Museum opened in 2010

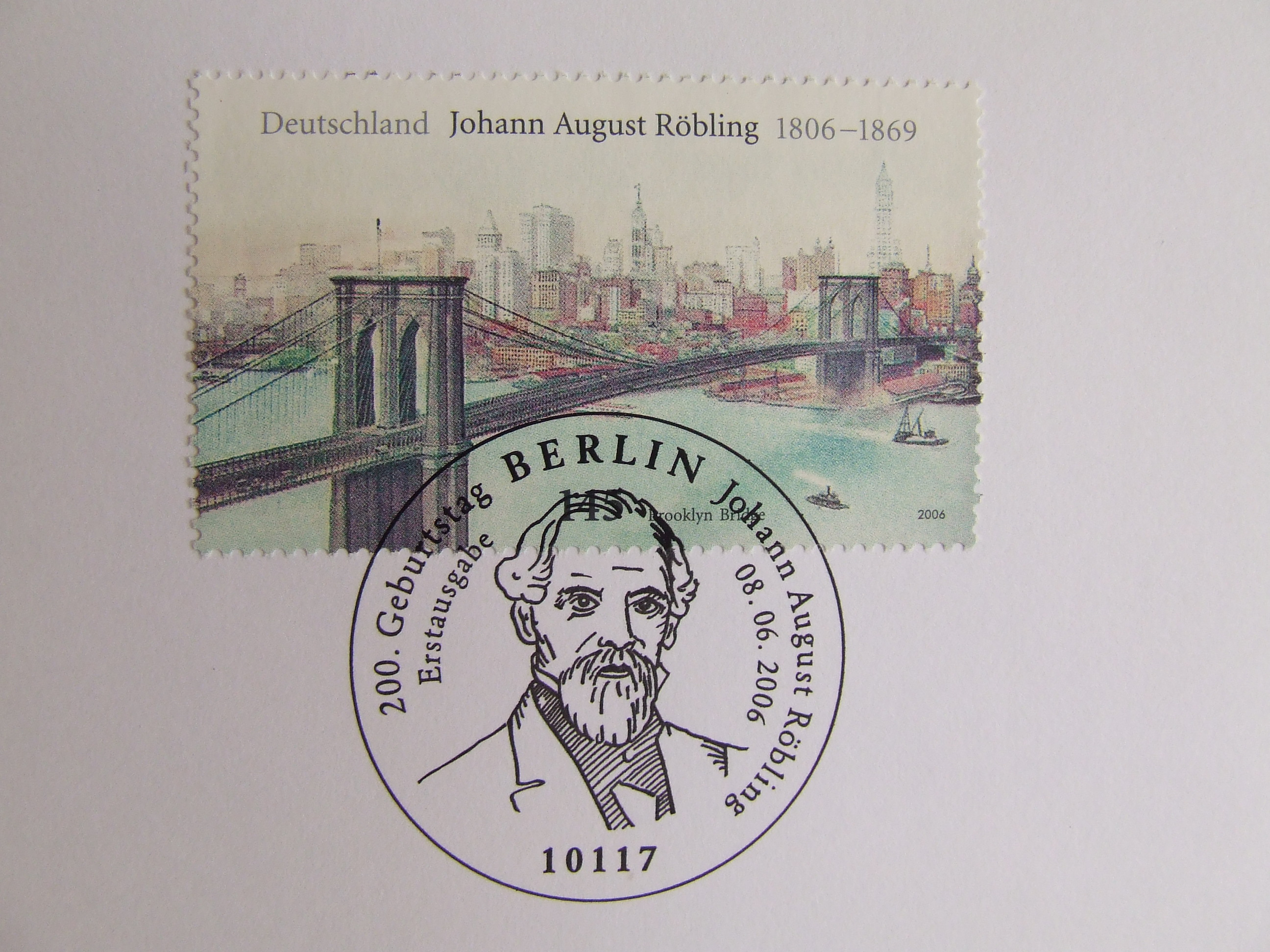
A 2006 German stamp commemorating Roebling

Roebling devised "an equilibrium strength approach, in which equilibrium is always satisfied but compatibility of deformations is not enforced." This was essentially an approximation method similar to the force method: First, Roebling computed the dead and live loads, then divided the load between the cables and the stays. Roebling added a large safety factor to the divided loads and then solved for the forces. This approach gave a sufficiently accurate analysis of the structure given the assumption that the structure was sufficiently ductile to handle the resulting deformation (Buonopane, 2006).

Roebling's company John A Roebling's Sons Co. is credited with being the cable contractor for the Golden Gate Bridge in San Francisco, California, constructed from 1933 to 1937. The Golden Gate Bridge was and still is a technical engineering marvel that Roebling, posthumously, has his footprint on.

Kinkora Works, the site of the Roebling Company factory complex in Roebling, New Jersey was opened as a museum in 2010. The museum tells the story of the Roebling family and the John A. Roebling's Sons Company.

=== Projects ===
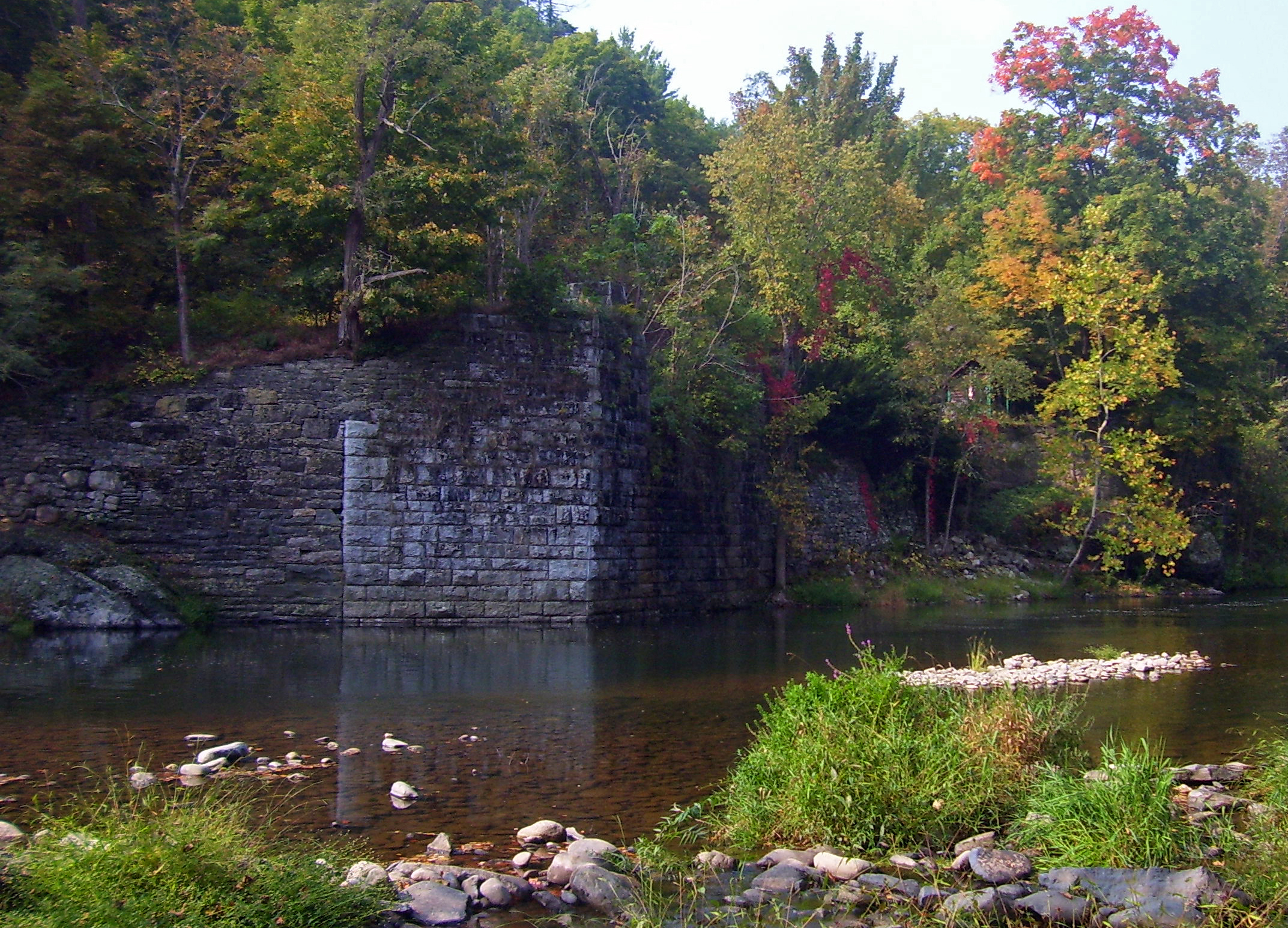
Remaining abutment of the D&H Neversink Aqueduct

- c.1800s "Demonstration Bridge" spans two buildings of the former Roebling Plant, Trenton, NJ. Now the Mercer County Executive Building on 175 South Broad Street, Trenton, NJ.
- 1844 Allegheny Aqueduct Bridge – Pittsburgh; 162 feet (49 m) spans; demolished 1861
- 1846 Smithfield Street Bridge – Pittsburgh; 188 feet (57 m) spans; replaced 1881–1883
- 1848 Lackawaxen Aqueduct – spanning the Lackawaxen River at Lackawaxen, Pennsylvania; two spans of 115 feet (35m) each, two 7-inch (18 cm) cables; no longer extant
- 1849 Roebling's Delaware Aqueduct – spanning the Delaware River from Lackawaxen, Pennsylvania to Minisink Ford, New York, four spans of 134 feet (41 m) each, two 8-inch (20 cm) cables; converted to vehicular and pedestrian use, restored in 1965 and 1995
- 1850 High Falls Aqueduct – one span of 145 feet (44 m), two 8½-inch (22 cm) cables
- 1850 Neversink Aqueduct – spanning the Neversink River; one span of 170 feet (52m), two 9½-inch (24 cm) cables
- 1854 Niagara Falls Suspension Bridge – spanning the Niagara River from Niagara Falls, New York to Niagara Falls, Canada, 821 feet (250 m) span
- 1859 Allegheny Bridge – Pittsburgh; 344-foot (105 m) spans
- 1866 John A. Roebling Suspension Bridge – spanning the Ohio River from Cincinnati, Ohio to Covington, Kentucky; 1,057 feet (322 m) long with a deck clearance of 100 feet (30 m)
- 1883 Brooklyn Bridge – spanning the East River from Manhattan to Brooklyn in New York City; 1,595 feet (486 m) span
- 1898 Ojuela Bridge (Puente de Ojuela) – suspension bridge at the site of the Ojuela Goldmine, Durango, Mexico; span of 271.5 metres
- 1904 The Riegelsville Bridge- 577 feet (176 m) suspension bridge crossing the Delaware River at Riegelsville, Pennsylvania, connecting it with Riegelsville, New Jersey, United States -opened on April 18, 1904

=== Honors ===
- In 2006, the Deutsche Post honored Roebling's 200th birthday with a stamp.
- Mühlhausen named the "John-August-Roebling-Schule" after him.

=== In popular culture ===
- Roebling makes a brief appearance in the opening scene of the 2001 romantic comedy film Kate & Leopold, portrayed by actor and dialect coach Andrew Jack. He delivers Roebling's lines in a pronounced German accent. This is an anachronism, as the scene takes place in 1876, seven years after Roebling's death.
- In the sixth-season Brooklyn Nine-Nine episode "The Tattler," it is revealed that Jake and Gina attended John Roebling High School.
- In the second season of The Gilded Age (TV series), an HBO drama, Emily Warren Roebling is depicted as having a larger role in the engineering of the Brooklyn Bridge than is publicly known. The fact that a woman engineered the bridge becomes an issue for the characters.
- In issue #36 of the comic-book series The Boys, M.M. mentions John A. Roebling, his son Washington and wife Emily while telling Hughie about the Brooklyn Bridge. In the story, the bridge is blown up on September 11, 2001, instead of the Twin Towers.

== Personal life ==
Roebling was the youngest of four children. He was baptized in the Lutheran church Divi Blasii in Mühlhausen. As a young boy he played the bass clarinet and the french horn. He also exhibited great artistic talent for sketches and paintings. His father owned a small tobacco shop, but the business was insufficient to provide livelihood for all three sons. Roebling's sister Friederike Amalie married Carl August Meissner, a poor merchant in the town, and his oldest brother Herman Christian Roebling prepared to take over the tobacco shop. As noted earlier, Roebling and his brother Carl immigrated to the United States, settling first in Pennsylvania.

John Roebling and Johanna Herting had nine children:

- son: Washington Augustus Roebling (b. 1837, d. 1926)
- daughter: Laura R. Methfessel (b. 1840, d. 1873)
- son: Ferdinand William Roebling (b. 1842, d. 1917)
- daughter: Elvira R. Stewart (b. 1844, d. 1871)
- daughter: Josephine R. Jarvis (b. 1847,)
- son: Charles Gustavus Roebling (b. 9-Dec-1849, d. 1918)
- son: Edmund Roebling (b. 1854, d. 1930)
- son: William Elderhorst Roebling (b. 1856, d. 1860)
- daughter: Hannah Roebling (died in infancy)

Roebling's son Washington and his daughter-in-law Emily Warren Roebling continued his work on the Brooklyn Bridge. His son Ferdinand expanded his wire rope business. His son Charles designed and invented a huge 80-ton wire rope machine and founded the town of Roebling, New Jersey. Here the John A. Roebling's Sons company steel mill was built.

His granddaughter Emily Roebling Cadwalader was a married Philadelphia socialite noted as the owner of historic yachts. His grandson Washington A. Roebling II died as a passenger on the RMS Titanic. His great-grandson Donald Roebling was a noted philanthropist and inventor who devised the amphtrack. His great-great-grandson Paul Roebling was a well-regarded actor.
