= Washington Roebling =

American civil engineer (1837–1926)

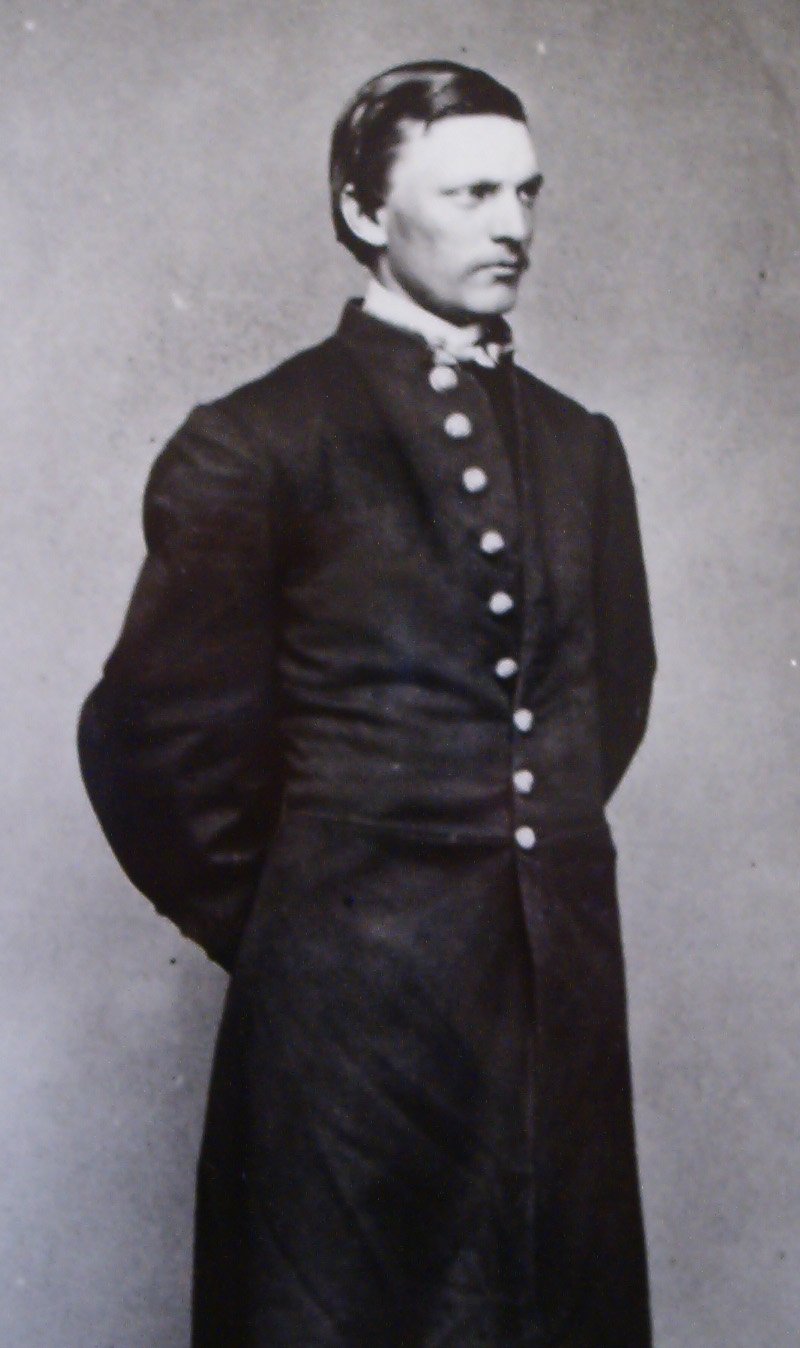
- Washington Augustus Roebling in 1854
- Born: Washington Augustus Roebling; May 26, 1837; Saxonburg, Pennsylvania, U.S.
- Died: July 21, 1926 (aged 89); Trenton, New Jersey, U.S.
- Education: Rensselaer Polytechnic Institute
- Spouse(s): Emily Warren Roebling (m. 1865; died 1903) Cornelia Wetzell Farrow (m. 1908)
- Children: John Augustus Roebling II
- Father: John A. Roebling
- Engineering career
- Projects: Allegheny Bridge, Cincinnati-Covington Bridge, Brooklyn Bridge
- Military career
- Allegiance: Union
- Branch: United States Army
- Service years: 1861–1865
- Rank: Colonel

Washington Augustus Roebling (May 26, 1837 – July 21, 1926) was an American civil engineer who supervised the construction of the Brooklyn Bridge, designed by his father John A. Roebling. He served in the Union Army during the American Civil War as an officer at the Battle of Gettysburg.

== Education and military service ==
The oldest son of Johanna (née Herting) and John A. Roebling, Washington was born in 1837 in Saxonburg, Pennsylvania, a town co-founded by his father and his uncle, Carl Roebling. His early schooling consisted of tutoring by Riedel and under Henne in Pittsburgh. He was sent to stay with Professor Lemuel Stephens of the Western University of Pennsylvania (now known as the University of Pittsburgh), where Roebling also attended some classes. Roebling eventually attended the Trenton Academy and acquired higher education in engineering at the Rensselaer Polytechnic Institute (RPI) in Troy, New York, from 1854 to 1857. He wrote a thesis titled "Design for a Suspension Aqueduct."

Following his graduation as civil engineer (C.E.), Roebling joined his father to work as a bridge builder. From 1858 to 1860, he assisted his father on the Sixth Street Bridge project to replace an older bridge over the Allegheny River. During that period, he lived in a boarding house on Penn Street. Following completion of the bridge, Roebling returned to Trenton, where he worked in his father's wire mill.

On April 16, 1861, soon after the start of the American Civil War, Roebling enlisted as a private in the New Jersey Militia. Seeking more than garrison duty, he resigned after two months and re-enlisted in a New York artillery battery: Company K, 83rd NY Volunteers. He performed staff duty engaged in the construction of suspension bridges to provide for the movement of troops. He rose steadily in rank and was soon commissioned as a 2nd Lieutenant.

Roebling saw action in numerous battles: Manassas Junction (Second Bull Run), Antietam, Chancellorsville, the Wilderness, Siege of Petersburg, and most notably, the Battle of Gettysburg. Soon after Chancellorsville, he was perhaps the first to note the movement of Robert E. Lee's Confederate Army toward the northwest while conducting air balloon reconnaissance.

On July 2, 1863, during Gettysburg, Roebling was one of the first Union officers on Little Round Top. Observing signs of approaching Confederate troops, he hurried down the hill to report to Brig. Gen. Gouverneur K. Warren, for whom Roebling was aide-de-camp. General Warren and Roebling descended further to find troops to secure this important tactical position. Roebling helped haul artillery up the hill, while Warren sent two of his aides, including Lt. Ranald S. Mackenzie, to search for infantry support. The two aides secured a brigade from the Union V Corps. Commanded by Col. Strong Vincent, the brigade immediately occupied the hill and defended the left flank of the Army of the Potomac against repeated Confederate attacks. As Vincent's brigade began moving into position, Warren and Roebling had left the hill. Roebling sent the 140th New York Volunteers to the hill, not knowing that Vincent's brigade was already engaging with advance Confederate troops. The 140th New York provided much needed reinforcements.

Roebling was brevetted lieutenant colonel in December 1864 for gallant service. He ended his service brevetted to colonel. After the war, he became a veteran companion of the Military Order of the Loyal Legion of the United States.

On January 18, 1865, he married Emily Warren in Cold Spring, New York.

== Construction of the Brooklyn Bridge ==
From mid-1865 to 1867, Roebling worked with his father on the Cincinnati-Covington Bridge (now the John A. Roebling Suspension Bridge). While traveling in Europe to research wire mills, bridges and caisson foundations, his only son, John A. Roebling II, was born. After returning to the U.S. in 1868, Washington became assistant engineer on the Brooklyn Bridge and was named chief engineer after his father's death in mid-1869. He made several important improvements on the bridge design and further developed bridge building techniques. Thus, he designed the two large pneumatic caissons that became the foundations for the two towers.

In 1870, fire broke out in one of the caissons; from within the caisson, Roebling directed the efforts to extinguish the flames. Working in compressed air in these caissons under the river caused him to get decompression sickness ("the bends") shattering his health and rendering him unable to visit the site, yet he continued to oversee the Brooklyn project to successful completion in 1883. Besides the bends, he may have had additional afflictions, possible neurasthenia, side effects of treatments, and secondary drug addiction. His wife, Emily Warren Roebling, who had taught herself bridge construction, took over much of the chief engineer's duties including day-to-day supervision and project management. Although the couple jointly planned the bridge's continued construction, Emily successfully lobbied for formal retention of Washington as chief engineer. McCullough remarked that "nowhere in the history of great undertakings is there anything comparable" to Roebling conducting the largest and most difficult engineering project ever "in absentia."

Roebling would battle the after-effects from the caisson disease and its treatment the rest of his life.

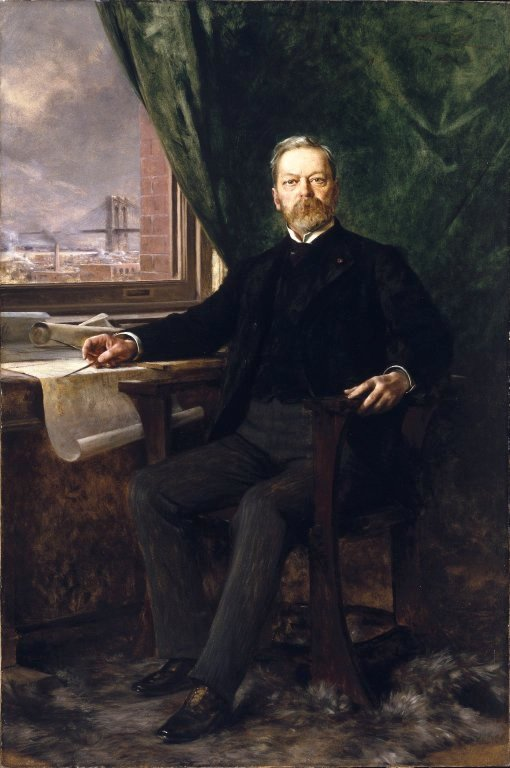
Théobald Chartran – Portrait of Washington A. Roebling – Brooklyn Museum

== Later years ==
Following the Brooklyn project, Roebling and his wife lived in Troy, New York, from 1884 to 1888, as their only child, John A. Roebling II, also attended RPI. When their son graduated, the Roeblings returned to Trenton, moving to 191 West State Street in 1892. From 1902 to 1903 Roebling served as President of the Alumni Association at Rensselaer. His wife Emily died in 1903 from stomach cancer. Roebling remarried in 1908 to Cornelia Wetzell Farrow of Charleston, South Carolina.

His namesake and nephew, Washington Augustus Roebling II, born March 25, 1881, only son of his brother Charles G. Roebling, went down with the RMS Titanic in 1912.

Following the sudden death of another nephew, Karl Gustavus Roebling, in 1921, Roebling again became president of John A. Roebling's Sons Company at age 84. He died in 1926, after being bedridden for two months, at age 89.

== Legacy ==
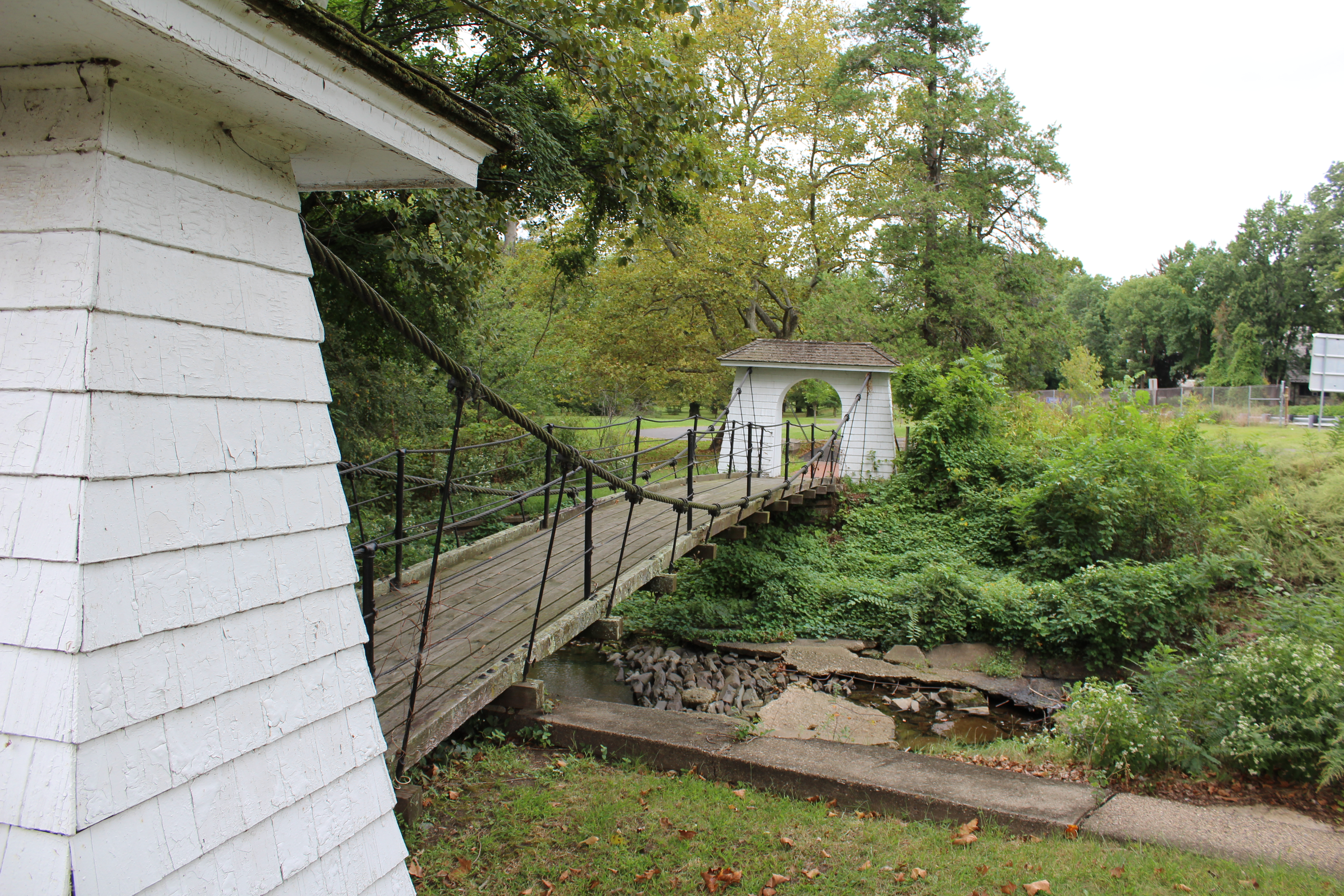
"The Shaky Bridge" near Trenton Water Filtration Plant on Route 29

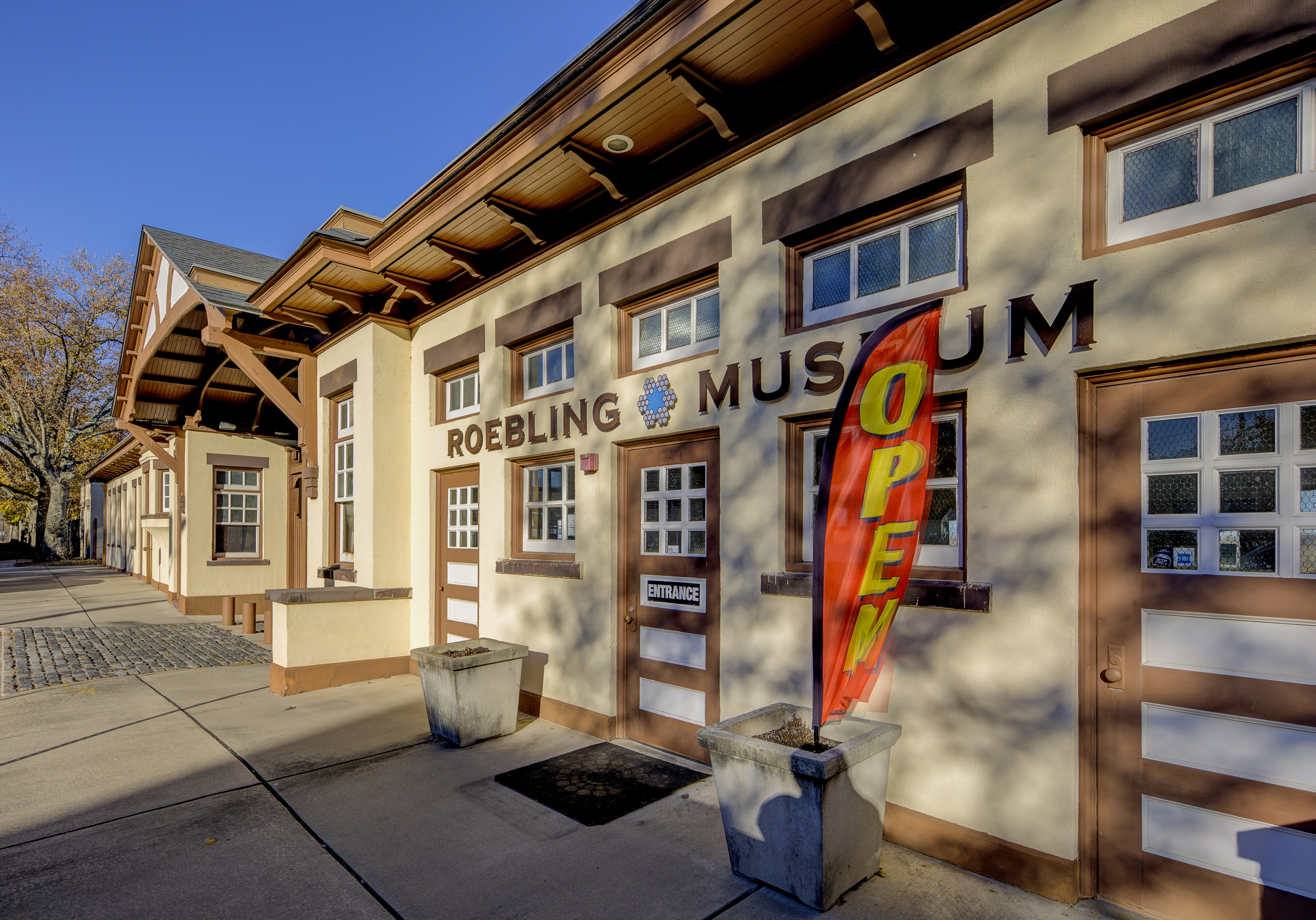
The Roebling Museum in Roebling, New Jersey

Roebling's most passionate hobby was collecting rocks and minerals. His collection of over 16,000 specimens was donated in 1926 by his son, John A. Roebling II, to the Smithsonian Institution and became an important part of its mineral and gem collection. One of the items in Roebling's collection was the Canary Diamond, a nearly 18-carat yellow diamond found in 1917 in Arkansas at what is now Crater of Diamonds State Park.

Roebling endowed the Mineralogical Society of America with funds that support the award of the society's Roebling Medal, its highest award. His gift of $40,000 in bonds became the Roebling Fund which has since grown in value to $1.5 million. Roebling Medal awardees include two Nobel Prize winners, Lawrence Bragg and Linus Pauling.

In 1967, thousands of architectural drawings used in the building of the Brooklyn Bridge were discovered in a city carpentery shop underneath the Williamsburg Bridge, including hundreds made by Roebling himself. They are now housed at the New York City Municipal Archives. Additionally, many of his manuscripts, photographs, and publications can be found in the Roebling collections at Rutgers University in New Brunswick, New Jersey, and at Rensselaer Polytechnic Institute in Troy, New York. His family silver is on display in Ashford Castle, Cong, Co Mayo, Ireland.

Roebling was voiced by descendant Paul Roebling in the 1990 Ken Burns PBS film The Civil War.

Kinkora Works, the site of the Roebling Company factory complex in Roebling, New Jersey, was opened as a museum in 2010. The museum tells the story of the Roebling family and the John A. Roebling’s Sons Company.
