= Johann Albert Eytelwein =

German engineer

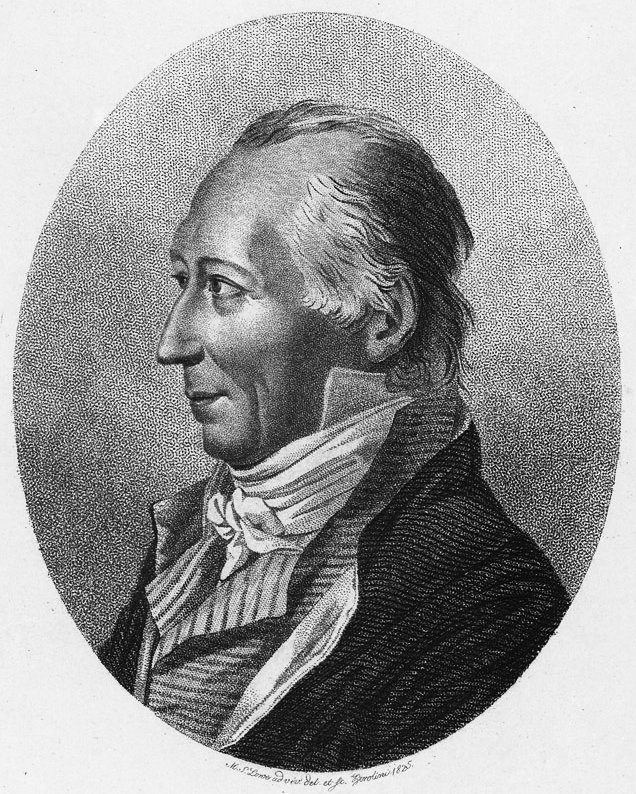
- Born: 31 December 1764; Frankfurt, Holy Roman Empire
- Died: 18 October 1849 (aged 84)

Johann Albert Eytelwein (31 December 1764 – 18 October 1849) was a German engineer who was among the first to examine mechanical problems dealing with friction, pulleys, and hydraulics.

Eytelwein was born in Frankfurt to Christian Philipp and Anna Elisabeth Katharina (née Hung). He joined the Prussian army in 1779 and became a bombardier in the 1st Artillery Regiment, later serving under General von Tempelhoff, who kindled an interest in engineering. He then trained as a surveyor and in 1790 became an inspector of buildings. His building department published the first German journal of civil engineering, Sammlung nützlicher Aufsätze und Nachrichten, die Baukunst betreffend, and in 1799 he was among the founders of the Berlin Bauakademie ("Building Academy"). He received an honorary doctorate from Berlin University in 1811. His major publication was the Handbuch der Mechanik fester Körper und Hydraulik (editions in 1801, 1823, 1842) and the Handbuch der Statik fester Körper (1808, 1832). In these works he examined pulleys and belts and examined the forces involved, developing on the theory of Euler. The Euler–Eytelwein Formula, also known as the capstan equation, was one of the key ideas introduced by him.
