= Archbold Biological Station =

Research institute in Florida, United States

- U.S. National Register of Historic Places
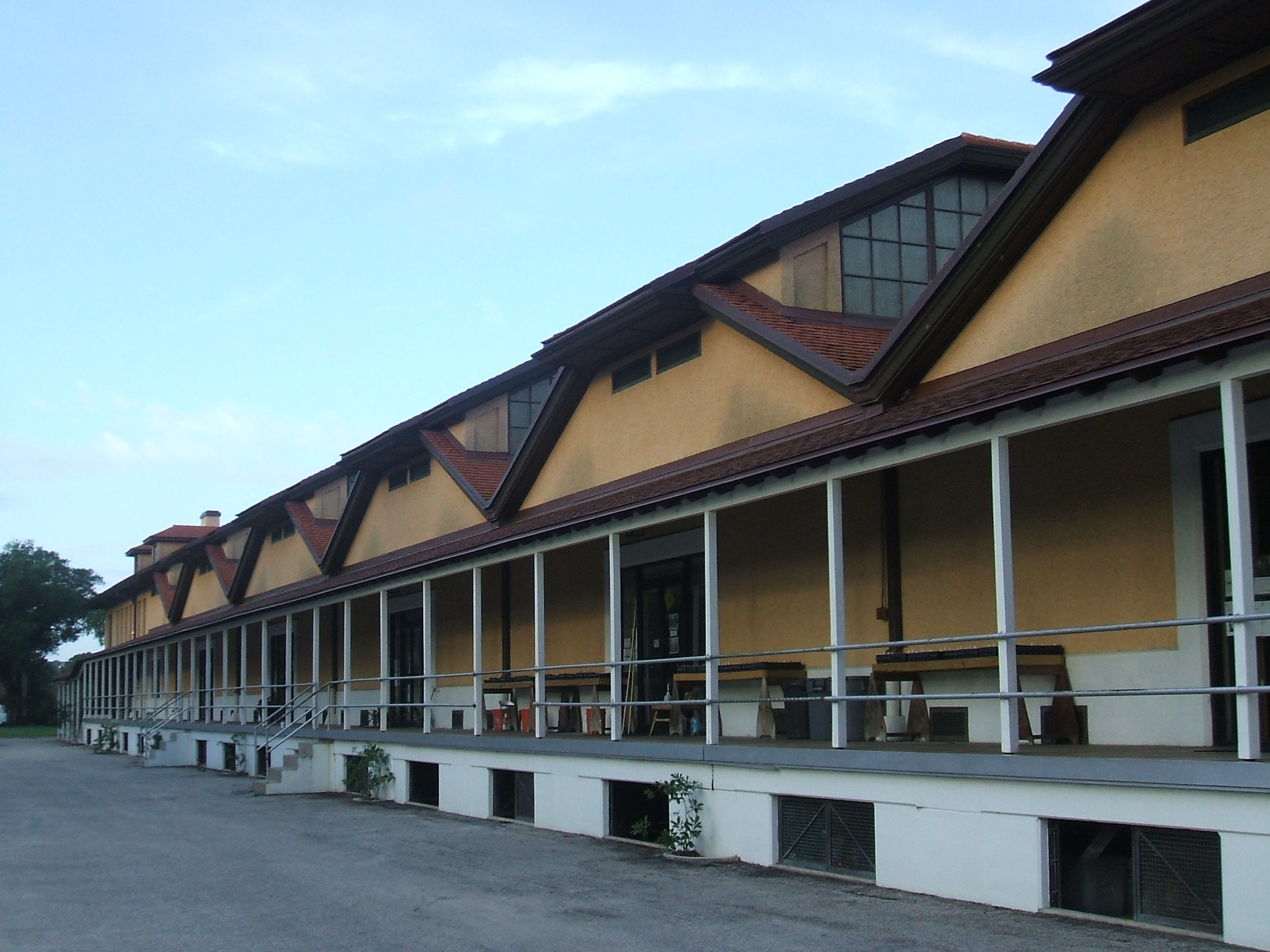
- Main building at Archbold Biological Station

- Location within Florida Location within the United States
- Location: Venus, Florida, US
- Coordinates: 27°10′50″N 81°21′0″W
- Area: 5,192.63 acres (21.0138 km^{2})
- Built: 1941
- NRHP reference No.: 07000698
- Added to NRHP: July 20, 2007

The Archbold Biological Station (ABS) is a research institute with a surrounding 5,192.63-acre (21 km^{2}) estate near Lake Placid, Florida, US, in Highlands County. It is a venue for field research and education, as well as ranching.

== History ==
The station was established in 1941 by Richard Archbold when his sponsorship of zoological research in New Guinea was curtailed by the outbreak of the Second World War in the Pacific region. Archbold acquired the initial land for the biological research station through his friend Donald Roebling from his father, John A. Roebling II. Subsequently, additional land was purchased. On July 20, 2007, the station was added to the U.S. National Register of Historic Places.

== Environment ==
The station encompasses an extensive area of Florida scrub, a scientifically interesting and highly threatened ecosystem. The Station supports 19 federally listed threatened species, including the Sand Skink (Neoseps reynoldsi) and 13 endemic plant species.

== Access ==
The station and grounds are open to visitors, who must register at the main office. There are some displays about the property and its history, a video about the biodiversity and conservation of the Lake Wales Ridge, a 1/2 mile nature trail, and picnic tables. Nature and environmental education programs are offered for schools, adults, and specialty groups.

== Climate ==
The climate of Archbold Biological Station is classified as humid subtropical (Köppen Cfa), bordering on a tropical monsoon climate (Am), with hot, humid summers and warm, drier winters. Winters are slightly too cool by about three degrees F (2 degrees C) in January. Also, its inland location on the well-drained sandy soil of the Lake Wales Ridge allows for high diurnal temperature variation, with frost and freeze conditions common each year, and a plant hardiness zone rating of 9. The record high and record low are 103 °F (39 °C) and 13 °F (−11 °C), recorded on July 4, 1998, and January 5, 2001, respectively.

Climate data for Archbold Biological Station, Florida, 1991-2020 normals, extremes 1969-present
Month	Jan	Feb	Mar	Apr	May	Jun	Jul	Aug	Sep	Oct	Nov	Dec	Year
Record high °F (°C)	89 (32)	92 (33)	95 (35)	98 (37)	100 (38)	102 (39)	103 (39)	101 (38)	99 (37)	97 (36)	96 (36)	91 (33)	103 (39)
Mean maximum °F (°C)	85.3 (29.6)	87.5 (30.8)	90.1 (32.3)	93.1 (33.9)	95.9 (35.5)	97.2 (36.2)	97.5 (36.4)	97.3 (36.3)	95.3 (35.2)	92.5 (33.6)	88.7 (31.5)	86.1 (30.1)	98.6 (37.0)
Mean daily maximum °F (°C)	75.0 (23.9)	78.4 (25.8)	81.7 (27.6)	86.3 (30.2)	90.3 (32.4)	92.2 (33.4)	93.3 (34.1)	93.4 (34.1)	91.2 (32.9)	87.3 (30.7)	81.1 (27.3)	77.0 (25.0)	85.6 (29.8)
Daily mean °F (°C)	61.4 (16.3)	64.2 (17.9)	67.1 (19.5)	71.7 (22.1)	76.3 (24.6)	80.5 (26.9)	81.7 (27.6)	82.1 (27.8)	80.7 (27.1)	75.7 (24.3)	68.9 (20.5)	64.4 (18.0)	72.9 (22.7)
Mean daily minimum °F (°C)	47.8 (8.8)	50.0 (10.0)	52.4 (11.3)	57.1 (13.9)	62.2 (16.8)	68.7 (20.4)	70.1 (21.2)	70.9 (21.6)	70.2 (21.2)	64.2 (17.9)	56.6 (13.7)	51.9 (11.1)	60.2 (15.7)
Mean minimum °F (°C)	25.8 (−3.4)	29.3 (−1.5)	33.7 (0.9)	39.1 (3.9)	49.0 (9.4)	61.4 (16.3)	64.9 (18.3)	65.5 (18.6)	62.9 (17.2)	47.1 (8.4)	37.5 (3.1)	30.7 (−0.7)	23.5 (−4.7)
Record low °F (°C)	13 (−11)	18 (−8)	20 (−7)	27 (−3)	36 (2)	50 (10)	58 (14)	60 (16)	55 (13)	34 (1)	27 (−3)	16 (−9)	13 (−11)
Average precipitation inches (mm)	2.18 (55)	2.25 (57)	2.87 (73)	2.54 (65)	4.36 (111)	8.85 (225)	8.34 (212)	8.49 (216)	7.17 (182)	3.41 (87)	1.74 (44)	2.03 (52)	54.23 (1,377)
Average precipitation days (≥ 0.01 in)	6.9	5.9	5.9	6.2	8.2	16.3	16.5	17.6	15.6	8.9	5.9	7.1	121.0
Source: NOAA

== Bibliography ==
- Morse, R. (2000). Richard Archbold and the Archbold Biological Station. Gainesville, Florida: University Press of Florida. ISBN 0-8130-1761-0.
