= Emily Warren Roebling =

American engineer (1843–1903)

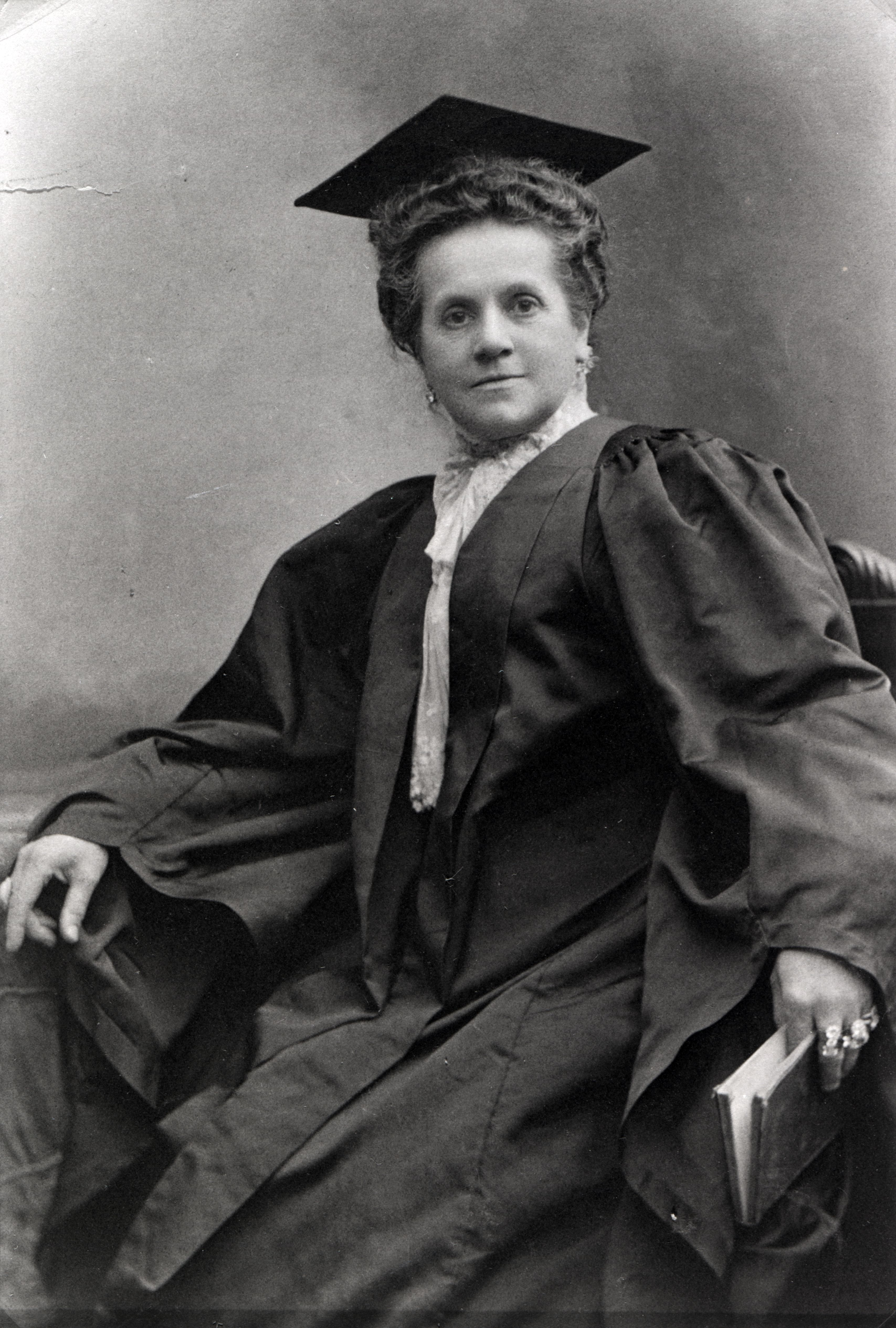
- Emily Warren Roebling in academic dress after receiving her law certificate from New York University, 1899.
- Born: September 23, 1843; Cold Spring, New York, U.S.
- Died: February 28, 1903 (aged 59); Trenton, New Jersey, U.S.
- Known for: Performing chief engineer duties in completion of the Brooklyn Bridge
- Spouse: Washington Roebling (m. 1865)
- Children: John A. Roebling II

Emily Warren Roebling (September 23, 1843 – February 28, 1903) was an engineer known for her contributions over a period of more than 10 years to the completion of the Brooklyn Bridge after her husband Washington Roebling developed caisson disease (a.k.a. decompression sickness) and became bedridden. She served as a liaison and supervisor of construction through communicating between her husband and on-site personnel. Her husband was the chief engineer during construction of the Brooklyn Bridge, which had been designed by his late father, John A. Roebling.

== Early life ==
Emily was born on September 23, 1843, to Sylvanus and Phebe Warren at Cold Spring, New York. She was the second-youngest of twelve children. Emily's interest in pursuing education was supported by her older brother Major General Gouverneur K. Warren. The two siblings always had a close relationship. She attended school at the Georgetown Visitation Academy in Washington, DC, now known as Georgetown Visitation Preparatory School.

In 1864, during the American Civil War, Emily visited her brother Gouverneur at his headquarters; Warren was commanding the Fifth Army Corps. At a soldiers' ball she attended during the visit, she became acquainted with Washington Roebling, a son of Brooklyn Bridge designer John A. Roebling. Washington was also a civil engineer and was serving on her brother Gouverneur Warren's staff.

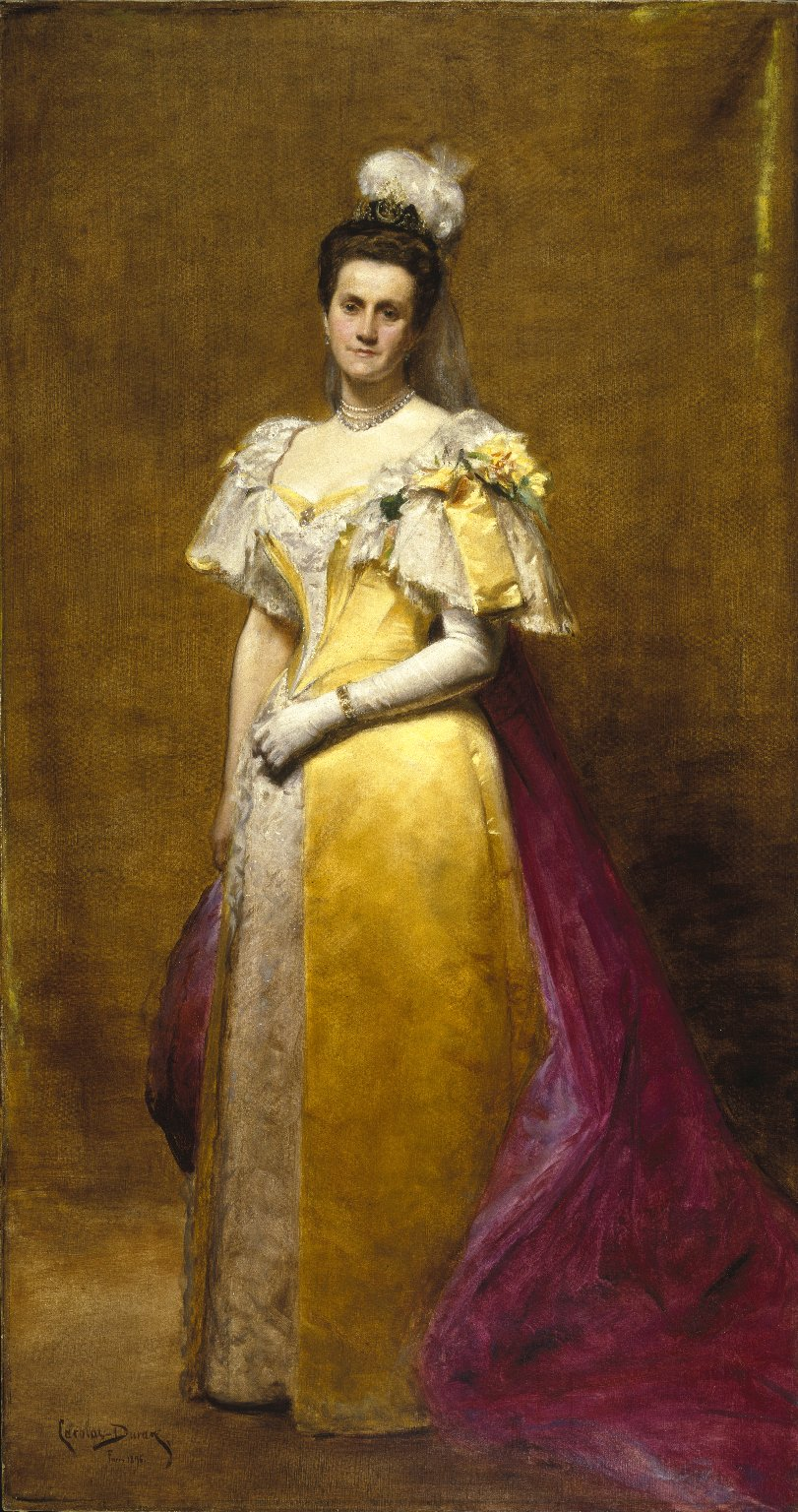
Portrait of Emily Warren Roebling by Carolus-Duran, Brooklyn Museum

On January 18, 1865, Emily and Washington married in Cold Spring, in a dual wedding ceremony with another of her Warren siblings and spouse.

While John Roebling was starting his preliminary work on the Brooklyn Bridge, the newlyweds went to Europe to study the use of caissons for constructing the bridge. In November 1867, Emily gave birth in Germany to the couple's only child, John A. Roebling II.

== Brooklyn Bridge ==
On their return from their European studies, Washington's father died in 1869 of tetanus, following an accident at the bridge site. Washington Roebling was assigned as chief engineer of the Brooklyn Bridge's construction. As he immersed himself in the project, Washington developed decompression sickness, which was known at the time as "caisson disease", by going to underwater depths to study the placement of caissons and not rising at the proper speed. It affected him so severely that he became bedridden.

As the only person to visit her husband during his sickness, Emily Roebling relayed information from Washington to his assistants and reported to him the progress of work on the bridge. She developed an extensive knowledge of strength of materials, stress analysis, cable construction, and calculating catenary curves through Washington's teachings. She complemented her knowledge by her prior interest in and study of the bridge's construction when her husband had been appointed as chief engineer.

For the decade after Washington was confined to his sick bed, Roebling was dedicated to the completion of the Brooklyn Bridge. She took over much of the chief engineer duties, including day-to-day supervision and project management. Emily and her husband jointly planned the bridge's continued construction. She dealt with politicians, competing engineers, and all those associated with work on the bridge, to the point where people believed she was behind the bridge's design.

In 1882, Washington's title of chief engineer was in jeopardy because of his extended illness. To allow him to retain his position, Roebling lobbied for him in meetings with engineers and politicians to defend her husband's work. To the Roeblings' relief, the politicians responded well and permitted Washington to remain chief engineer of the Brooklyn Bridge.

The Brooklyn Bridge was completed in 1883. In advance of the official opening, carrying a rooster as a sign of victory, Emily Roebling was the first to cross the bridge by carriage. At the opening ceremony, Roebling was honored in a speech by Abram Stevens Hewitt, who said that the bridge was

...an everlasting monument to the sacrificing devotion of a woman and of her capacity for that higher education from which she has been too long disbarred.

== Later life ==
Upon completion of her work on the Brooklyn Bridge, Roebling shifted to supporting several women's causes, including the Committee on Statistics of New Jersey's Board of Lady Managers for the World's Columbian Exposition in Chicago, Committee of Sorosis; Daughters of the American Revolution, George Washington Memorial Association, both of which worked on historical issues for the US; and Evelyn College. This followed after the Roebling family moved to Trenton, New Jersey, the capital of the state and a center of activities.

Roebling also participated in social organizations such as the Relief Society during the Spanish–American War. She traveled widely—in 1896 she was presented to Queen Victoria of the United Kingdom, and she was in St. Petersburg, Russian Empire, for the coronation of Tsar Nicholas II. She also continued her education and received a law certificate from New York University.

Roebling is known for her influential essay, "A Wife's Disabilities" (1899), published in the Albany Law Journal, which won wide acclaim and awards. In it, she argued for greater women's rights and railed against discriminatory practices targeted at women. She signed the essay with her husband's initials, W.A.R.

Until her death on February 28, 1903, from stomach cancer, Roebling spent her remaining time with her family and kept socially and mentally active.

== Tributes ==
The Brooklyn Bridge is marked with a plaque dedicated to the memory of Emily Warren Roebling, her husband Washington Roebling, and her father-in-law John A. Roebling.

In 2018 The New York Times published a belated obituary for Roebling, part of a series of obituaries for women and minorities whose achievements had been overlooked at their deaths.

Roebling's role in the successful completion of the Brooklyn Bridge, and her status as a woman in the United States during the late-nineteenth century is highlighted in season two of the HBO period drama The Gilded Age. Roebling's character, portrayed by Liz Wisan, is recognized for her efforts at the bridge's opening festivities.

In May 2024, Rensselaer Polytechnic Institute, her husband and son's alma mater, honored Roebling with a posthumous honorary doctorate as part of its bicentenial commencement. The degree was accepted in character by Wisan, with a speech generated by feeding quotes from Roebling into GPT-4.

Roebling's efforts to get the Brooklyn Bridge built, the relationship between her and her husband, and other aspects of the entire endeavor are depicted in the musical Brooklyn's Bridge. The touring production was performed at The Space at Irondale in Brooklyn, New York, in August of 2026.

== Works ==
- "Notes on the Warren Family", in The Journal of the Reverend Silas Constant. Philadelphia: Lippincott, 1903; Appendix, p. 466
