= Roebling =

Roebling may refer to:

== Places ==
- Roebling, New Jersey, an unincorporated community in Burlington County
- Roebling station, in New Jersey
- Florence-Roebling, New Jersey, a former CDP
- Roebling Point, an area in Covington, Kentucky

== People ==
- Donald Roebling (1908–1959), American inventor, engineer and philanthropist
- Emily Roebling Cadwalader (1881–1941), American socialite
- Emily Warren Roebling (1843–1903), American engineer
- John A. Roebling (1806–1869), German-born American civil engineer
- John A. Roebling II (1867–1952), American civil engineer
- Mary Roebling (1905–1994), American banker
- Paul Roebling (1934–1994), American actor
- Washington Roebling (1836–1926), American civil engineer

== Other ==
- Donald Roebling Estate, home of Donald Roebling in Florida
- Roebling Bridge, including:
  - John A. Roebling Suspension Bridge, over the Ohio River
  - Roebling's Delaware Aqueduct, between New York and Pennsylvania
- Roebling Medal, awarded by Mineralogical Society of America
- Roebling Road Raceway, a racetrack in Georgia
- The Ascent at Roebling's Bridge, a building in Covington, Kentucky
