= Florence (CDP), New Jersey =

Populated place in Burlington County, New Jersey, US

Florence, New Jersey
- Census-designated place
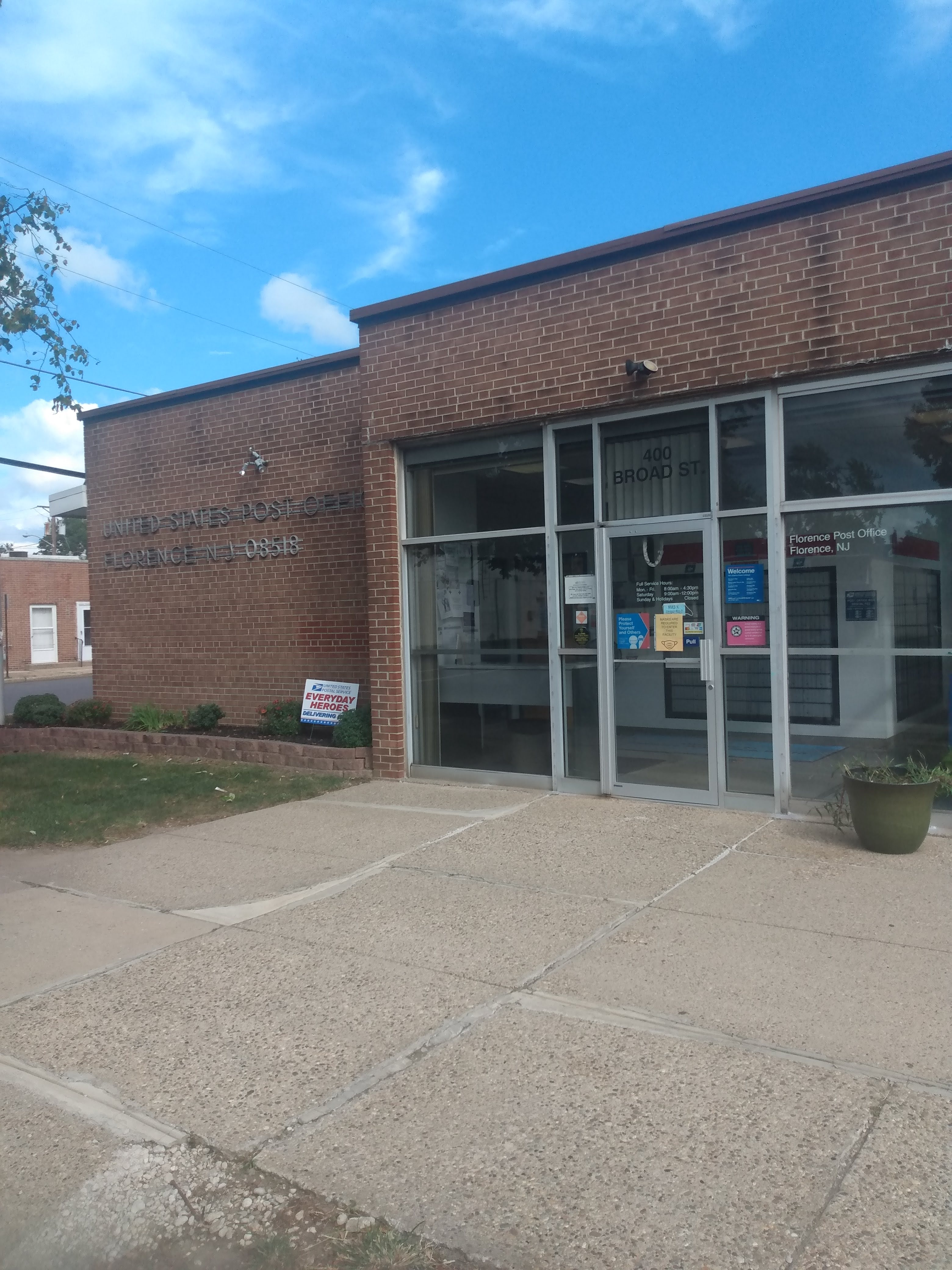
- Florence Post Office

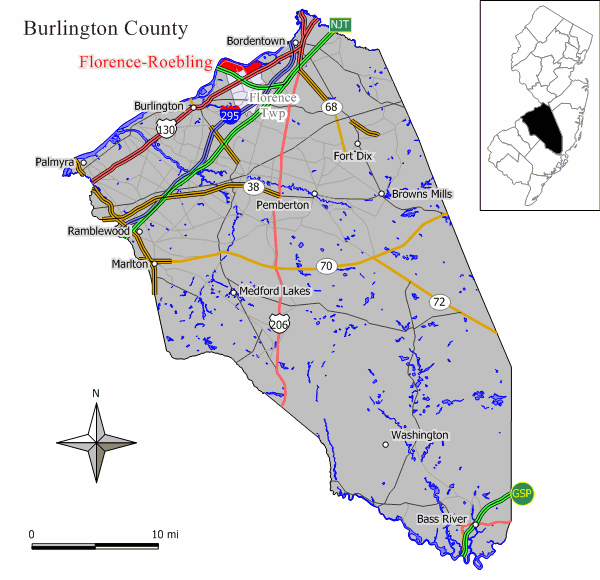
- Map of the former Florence-Roebling CDP in Burlington County. Inset: Location of Burlington County in New Jersey.

- Florence CDP's location in Burlington County (Inset: Location of Burlington County in New Jersey). Florence, New Jersey (New Jersey) Florence, New Jersey (the United States)
- Coordinates: 40.119160°N 74.808773°W
- Country: United States
- State: New Jersey
- County: Burlington
- Township: Florence

Area
  - Total: 1.47 sq mi (3.82 km^{2})
  - Land: 1.25 sq mi (3.23 km^{2})
  - Water: 0.22 sq mi (0.58 km^{2}) 15.23%
- Elevation: 23 ft (7 m)

Population (2020)
  - Total: 4,704
  - Density: 3,766.5/sq mi (1,454.26/km^{2})
- Time zone: UTC−05:00 (Eastern (EST))
  - Summer (DST): UTC−04:00 (Eastern (EDT))
- ZIP Code: 08518
- Area code: 609
- FIPS code: 34-23820
- GNIS feature ID: 02652334

Florence is an unincorporated community and census-designated place (CDP) located within Florence Township, in Burlington County, in the U.S. state of New Jersey, that was established as part of the 2010 United States census. As of the 2000 United States census, the CDP was combined as Florence-Roebling, which had a total population of 8,200. As of the 2010 Census, the Florence-Roebling CDP was split into its components, Roebling (with a population of 3,715) and Florence. As of the 2010 Census, the population of the Florence CDP was 4,426.

== Geography ==
According to the United States Census Bureau, the CDP had a total area of 1.490 square miles (3.857 km^{2}), including 1.263 square miles (3.270 km^{2}) of land and 0.587 square miles (1.029 km^{2}) of water (15.23%).

== Demographics ==
Historical population
| Census | Pop. | Note | %± |
|---|---|---|---|
| 2010 | 4,426 | | — |
| 2020 | 4,704 | | 6.3% |
Population source: 2010 2020

Florence first appeared as a census designated place in the 2010 U.S. census formed from part of deleted Florence-Roebling CDP.

=== 2020 census ===
Florence CDP, New Jersey – Racial and ethnic composition Note: the US Census treats Hispanic/Latino as an ethnic category. This table excludes Latinos from the racial categories and assigns them to a separate category. Hispanics/Latinos may be of any race.
| Race / Ethnicity (NH = Non-Hispanic) | Pop 2010 | Pop 2020 | % 2010 | % 2020 |
|---|---|---|---|---|
| White alone (NH) | 3,176 | 2,998 | 71.76% | 63.73% |
| Black or African American alone (NH) | 720 | 723 | 16.27% | 15.37% |
| Native American or Alaska Native alone (NH) | 6 | 9 | 0.14% | 0.19% |
| Asian alone (NH) | 126 | 321 | 2.85% | 6.82% |
| Native Hawaiian or Pacific Islander alone (NH) | 2 | 4 | 0.05% | 0.09% |
| Other race alone (NH) | 15 | 20 | 0.34% | 0.43% |
| Mixed race or Multiracial (NH) | 149 | 239 | 3.37% | 5.08% |
| Hispanic or Latino (any race) | 232 | 390 | 5.24% | 8.29% |
| Total | 4,426 | 4,704 | 100.00% | 100.00% |

=== 2010 census ===
The 2010 United States census counted 4,426 people, 1,857 households, and 1,166 families in the CDP. The population density was 3,505.3 per square mile (1,353.4/km^{2}). There were 1,998 housing units at an average density of 1,582.4 per square mile (611.0/km^{2}). The racial makeup was 74.20% (3,284) White, 16.85% (746) Black or African American, 0.16% (7) Native American, 2.87% (127) Asian, 0.05% (2) Pacific Islander, 1.63% (72) from other races, and 4.25% (188) from two or more races. Hispanic or Latino of any race were 5.24% (232) of the population.

Of the 1,857 households, 24.9% had children under the age of 18; 42.1% were married couples living together; 16.0% had a female householder with no husband present and 37.2% were non-families. Of all households, 31.4% were made up of individuals and 11.0% had someone living alone who was 65 years of age or older. The average household size was 2.38 and the average family size was 3.00.

21.0% of the population were under the age of 18, 8.4% from 18 to 24, 25.8% from 25 to 44, 31.2% from 45 to 64, and 13.6% who were 65 years of age or older. The median age was 41.3 years. For every 100 females, the population had 90.4 males. For every 100 females ages 18 and older there were 88.7 males.

== Transportation ==
The River Line offers service to Camden and Trenton Rail Station, with stations in Roebling at Hornberger Avenue and Florence at U.S. Route 130.

New Jersey Transit provides service to and from Philadelphia on the 409.

== Education ==
The school district is Florence Township School District.
