= Florence-Roebling, New Jersey =

Populated place in Burlington County, New Jersey, US

- Former census-designated place
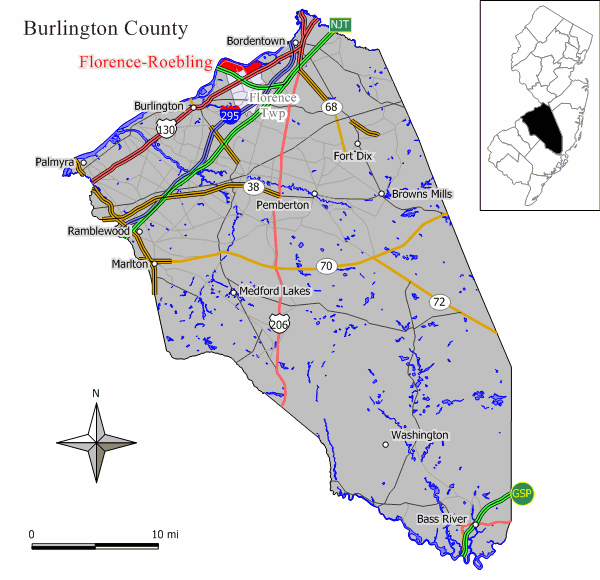
- Map of former Florence-Roebling CDP in Burlington County
- Coordinates: 40°7′1″N 74°47′41″W
- Country: United States
- State: New Jersey
- County: Burlington
- Township: Florence

Area
  - Total: 2.6 sq mi (6.8 km^{2})
  - Land: 2.2 sq mi (5.7 km^{2})
  - Water: 0.42 sq mi (1.1 km^{2})

Population (2000 Census)
  - Total: 8,200
  - Density: 3,707/sq mi (1,431.3/km^{2})
- Time zone: UTC−05:00 (Eastern (EST))
  - Summer (DST): UTC−04:00 (Eastern (EDT))
- FIPS code: 34-23895

Florence-Roebling is an unincorporated community and former census-designated place (CDP) located within Florence Township, in Burlington County, New Jersey, United States, that existed up to and including the 2000 United States census. As of the 2000 Census, the CDP's population was 8,200. With the 2010 United States census, the CDP was split into its components, with the creation of separate CDPs for Florence CDP (with a 2010 Census population of 4,426) and Roebling (3,715).

== Geography ==
According to the United States Census Bureau, the CDP had a total area of 6.8 km^{2} (2.6 sq mi). 5.7 km^{2} (2.2 sq mi) of land and 1.1 km^{2} (0.42 sq mi) of water (15.91%).

== Demographics ==
Historical population
Census	Pop.	Note	%±
1950	6,785		—
1960	7,487		10.3%
1970	7,551		0.9%
1980	7,677		1.7%
1990	8,564		11.6%
2000	8,200		−4.3%
Population sources: 1950 1960 1970; 1980 1990 2000; 2010

Florence-Roebling first appeared as an unincorporated community in the 1950 U.S. census. In the 1960 U.S. census, it was broken into the two separate communities of Florence (pop. 4,215) and Roebling (pop. 3,272) before being combined again for the 1970 U.S. census. The community was listed as a census designated place in the 1980 U.S. census.

Florence-Roebling CDP, New Jersey – Racial and ethnic composition Note: the US Census treats Hispanic/Latino as an ethnic category. This table excludes Latinos from the racial categories and assigns them to a separate category. Hispanics/Latinos may be of any race.
Race / Ethnicity (NH = Non-Hispanic)	Pop 2000	2000
White alone (NH)	6,868	83.76%
Black or African American alone (NH)	859	10.48%
Native American or Alaska Native alone (NH)	7	0.09%
Asian alone (NH)	168	2.05%
Native Hawaiian or Pacific Islander alone (NH)	1	0.01%
Other race alone (NH)	9	0.11%
Mixed race or Multiracial (NH)	121	1.48%
Hispanic or Latino (any race)	167	2.04%
Total	8,200	100.00%

As of the 2000 United States census there were 8,200 people, 3,220 households, and 2,170 families residing in the CDP. The population density was 1,432.6 people /km^{2} (3,710 people/mi^{2}). There were 3,439 housing units at an average density of 600.8 units /km^{2} (1,556 units/mi^{2}). The racial makeup of the CDP was 85.07% White, 10.54% African American, 0.09% Native American, 2.09% Asian, 0.01% Pacific Islander, 0.61% from other races, and 1.60% from two or more races. Hispanic or Latino of any race were 2.04% of the population.

There were 3,220 households, out of which 33.0% had children under the age of 18 living with them, 47.0% were married couples living together, 15.1% had a female householder with no husband present, and 32.6% were non-families. 27.6% of all households were made up of individuals, and 10.7% had someone living alone who was 65 years of age or older. The average household size was 2.53 and the average family size was 3.10.

In the CDP the population was spread out, with 25.6% under the age of 18, 7.9% from 18 to 24, 31.6% from 25 to 44, 21.9% from 45 to 64, and 12.9% who were 65 years of age or older. The median age was 36 years. For every 100 females, there were 89.7 males. For every 100 females age 18 and over, there were 85.1 males.

The median income for a household in the CDP was $51,192, and the median income for a family was $61,135. Males had a median income of $42,985 versus $30,493 for females. The per capita income for the CDP was $22,074. About 5.7% of families and 7.3% of the population were below the poverty line, including 7.6% of those under age 18 and 8.1% of those age 65 or over.

== Transportation ==
The River Line offers service to Camden and Trenton Rail Station, with stations in Roebling at Hornberger Avenue and Florence at U.S. Route 130.

== Roebling Steel Mill ==
External videos
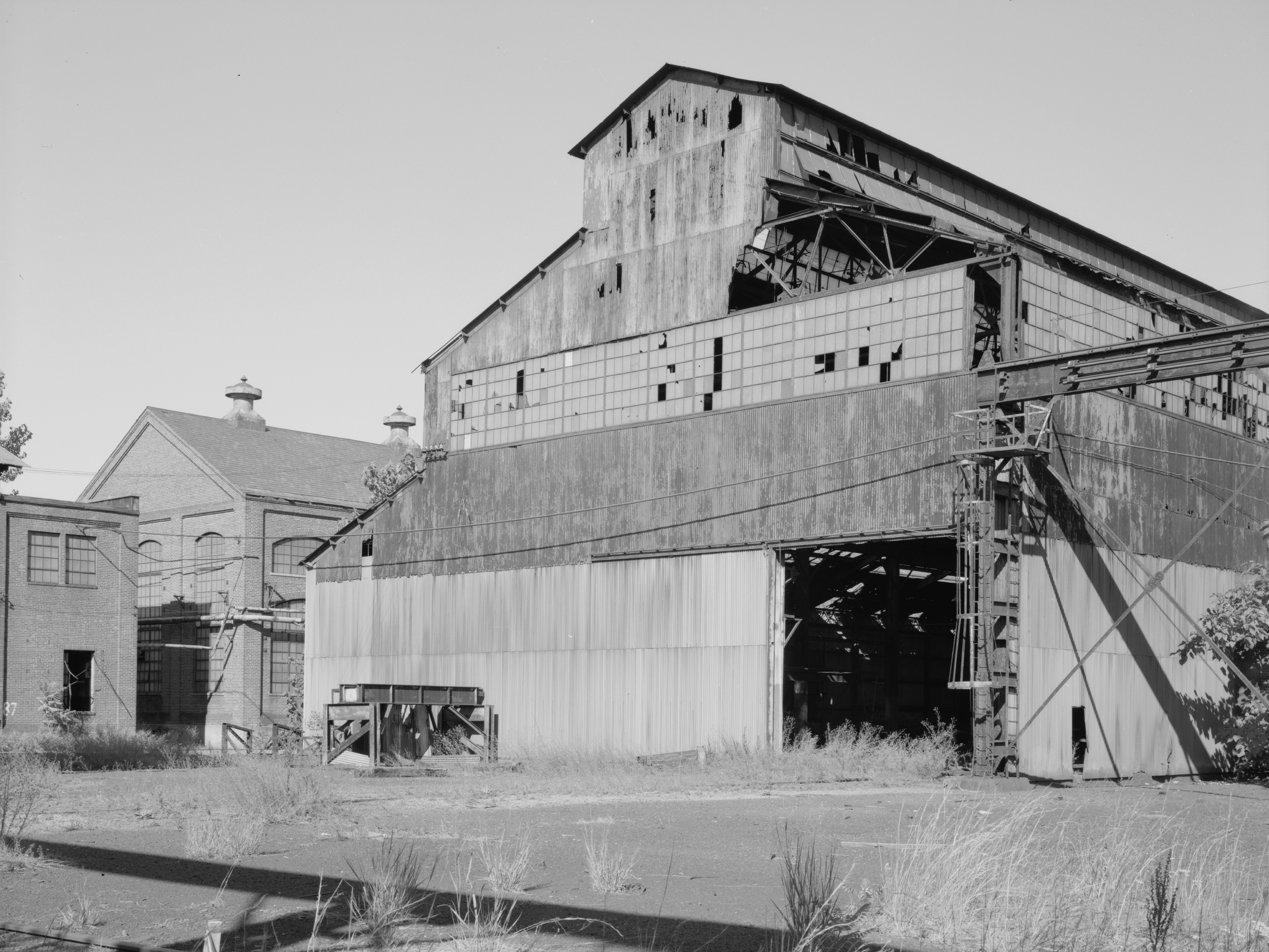
- Roebling Company and Building Trenton, C-SPAN

Roebling was founded by Charles Roebling, son of John A. Roebling. John A. Roebling & Sons company built and provided the steel for the Brooklyn Bridge, the Golden Gate Bridge, as well as numerous other bridges including one over Niagara Falls.

The steel mill was also responsible for the production of the elevator cables for the Empire State Building in New York City, the Chicago Board of Trade Building in Chicago and the Washington Monument in Washington, D.C. John A. Roebling & Sons company made the wire for the original slinky as well.
