= Roebling, New Jersey =

Populated place in Burlington County, New Jersey, US

- Census-designated place
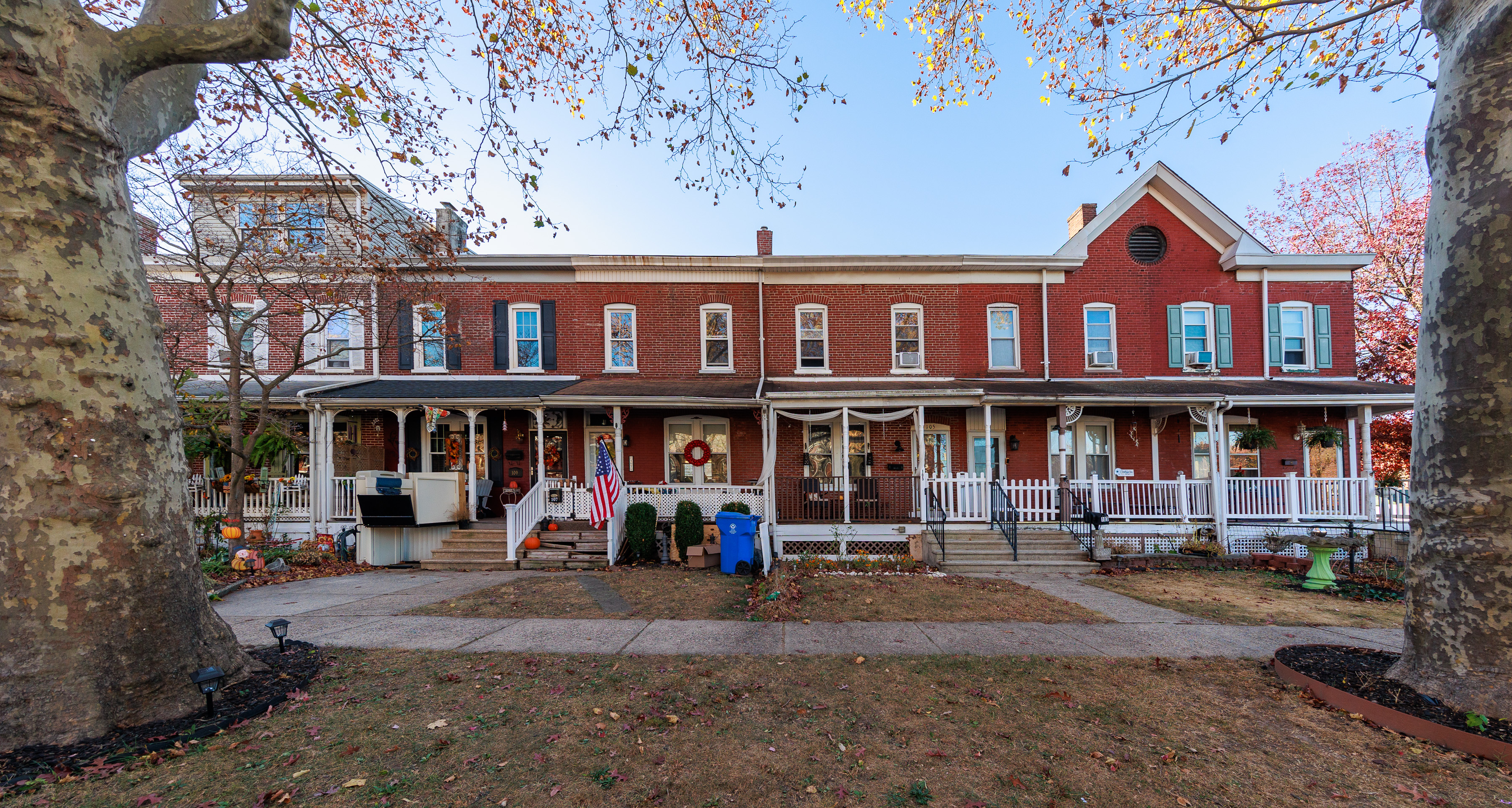
- Residences in Roebling

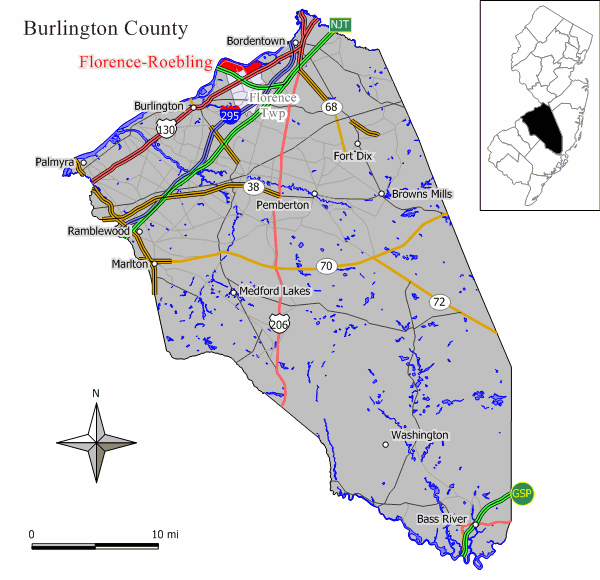
- Map of the former Florence-Roebling CDP in Burlington County. Inset: Location of Burlington County in New Jersey.

- Location in Burlington County Location in New Jersey Location in the United States
- Coordinates: 40.117217°N 74.783817°W
- Country: United States
- State: New Jersey
- County: Burlington
- Township: Florence
- Named for: Charles Roebling

Area
  - Total: 1.15 sq mi (2.97 km^{2})
  - Land: 0.99 sq mi (2.57 km^{2})
  - Water: 0.16 sq mi (0.41 km^{2}) 14.07%
- Elevation: 43 ft (13 m)

Population (2020)
  - Total: 3,585
  - Density: 3,618.8/sq mi (1,397.24/km^{2})
- Time zone: UTC−05:00 (Eastern (EST))
  - Summer (DST): UTC−04:00 (Eastern (EDT))
- ZIP Code: 08554
- Area codes: 609/640
- FIPS code: 34-64350
- GNIS feature ID: 02584023

Roebling is an unincorporated community and census-designated place (CDP) located within Florence Township, in Burlington County, in the U.S. state of New Jersey, that was established as part of the 2010 United States census. As of the 2000 United States census, the CDP was combined as Florence-Roebling, which had a total population of 8,200. As of the 2010 Census, the Florence-Roebling CDP was split into its components, Florence (with a population of 4,426) and Roebling. As of the 2010 Census, the population of the Florence CDP was 4,426.

== History ==
Roebling, site of the Roebling Steel Mill, the Kinkora Works, was founded by Charles Roebling, son of John A. Roebling. John A. Roebling & Sons company built and provided the steel for the Brooklyn Bridge, the Golden Gate Bridge, as well as numerous other bridges including one over Niagara Falls.

The steel mill was also responsible for the production of the elevator cables for the Empire State Building in New York City, the Chicago Board of Trade Building in Chicago and the Washington Monument in Washington, D.C. John A. Roebling & Sons company made the wire for the original slinky as well.

== Geography ==
According to the United States Census Bureau, the CDP had a total area of 1.173 square miles (3.036 km^{2}), including 1.008 square miles (2.610 km^{2}) of land and 0.165 square miles (0.426 km^{2}) of water (14.07%).

== Demographics ==
Historical population
| Census | Pop. | Note | %± |
|---|---|---|---|
| 2010 | 3,715 | | — |
| 2020 | 3,585 | | −3.5% |
Population source: 2010

Roebling first appeared as a census designated place in the 2010 U.S. census formed from part of deleted Florence-Roebling CDP.

=== Racial and ethnic composition ===
Roebling CDP, New Jersey – Racial and ethnic composition Note: the US Census treats Hispanic/Latino as an ethnic category. This table excludes Latinos from the racial categories and assigns them to a separate category. Hispanics/Latinos may be of any race.
| Race / Ethnicity (NH = Non-Hispanic) | Pop 2010 | Pop 2020 | % 2010 | % 2020 |
|---|---|---|---|---|
| White alone (NH) | 2,981 | 2,556 | 80.24% | 71.30% |
| Black or African American alone (NH) | 289 | 305 | 7.78% | 8.51% |
| Native American or Alaska Native alone (NH) | 0 | 3 | 0.00% | 0.08% |
| Asian alone (NH) | 172 | 323 | 4.63% | 9.01% |
| Native Hawaiian or Pacific Islander alone (NH) | 0 | 0 | 0.00% | 0.00% |
| Other race alone (NH) | 3 | 15 | 0.08% | 0.42% |
| Mixed race or Multiracial (NH) | 94 | 162 | 2.53% | 4.52% |
| Hispanic or Latino (any race) | 176 | 221 | 4.74% | 6.16% |
| Total | 3,715 | 3,585 | 100.00% | 100.00% |

=== 2020 census ===
As of the 2020 census, Roebling had a population of 3,585. The median age was 39.6 years. 21.3% of residents were under the age of 18 and 14.0% of residents were 65 years of age or older. For every 100 females there were 96.0 males, and for every 100 females age 18 and over there were 93.2 males age 18 and over.

100.0% of residents lived in urban areas, while 0.0% lived in rural areas.

There were 1,410 households in Roebling, of which 31.1% had children under the age of 18 living in them. Of all households, 44.6% were married-couple households, 18.5% were households with a male householder and no spouse or partner present, and 29.6% were households with a female householder and no spouse or partner present. About 28.0% of all households were made up of individuals and 10.0% had someone living alone who was 65 years of age or older.

There were 1,503 housing units, of which 6.2% were vacant. The homeowner vacancy rate was 2.3% and the rental vacancy rate was 6.8%.

=== 2010 census ===
The 2010 United States census counted 3,715 people, 1,410 households, and 964 families in the CDP. The population density was 3,687.1 per square mile (1,423.6/km^{2}). There were 1,481 housing units at an average density of 1,469.9 per square mile (567.5/km^{2}). The racial makeup was 83.28% (3,094) White, 8.51% (316) Black or African American, 0.32% (12) Native American, 4.63% (172) Asian, 0.00% (0) Pacific Islander, 0.48% (18) from other races, and 2.77% (103) from two or more races. Hispanic or Latino of any race were 4.74% (176) of the population.

Of the 1,410 households, 33.5% had children under the age of 18; 47.6% were married couples living together; 16.0% had a female householder with no husband present and 31.6% were non-families. Of all households, 25.1% were made up of individuals and 8.0% had someone living alone who was 65 years of age or older. The average household size was 2.63 and the average family size was 3.19.

24.8% of the population were under the age of 18, 7.4% from 18 to 24, 29.5% from 25 to 44, 27.2% from 45 to 64, and 11.1% who were 65 years of age or older. The median age was 37.7 years. For every 100 females, the population had 88.3 males. For every 100 females ages 18 and older there were 86.7 males.

== Historic district ==
- Roebling Historic District
- U.S. National Register of Historic Places
- U.S. Historic district
- New Jersey Register of Historic Places
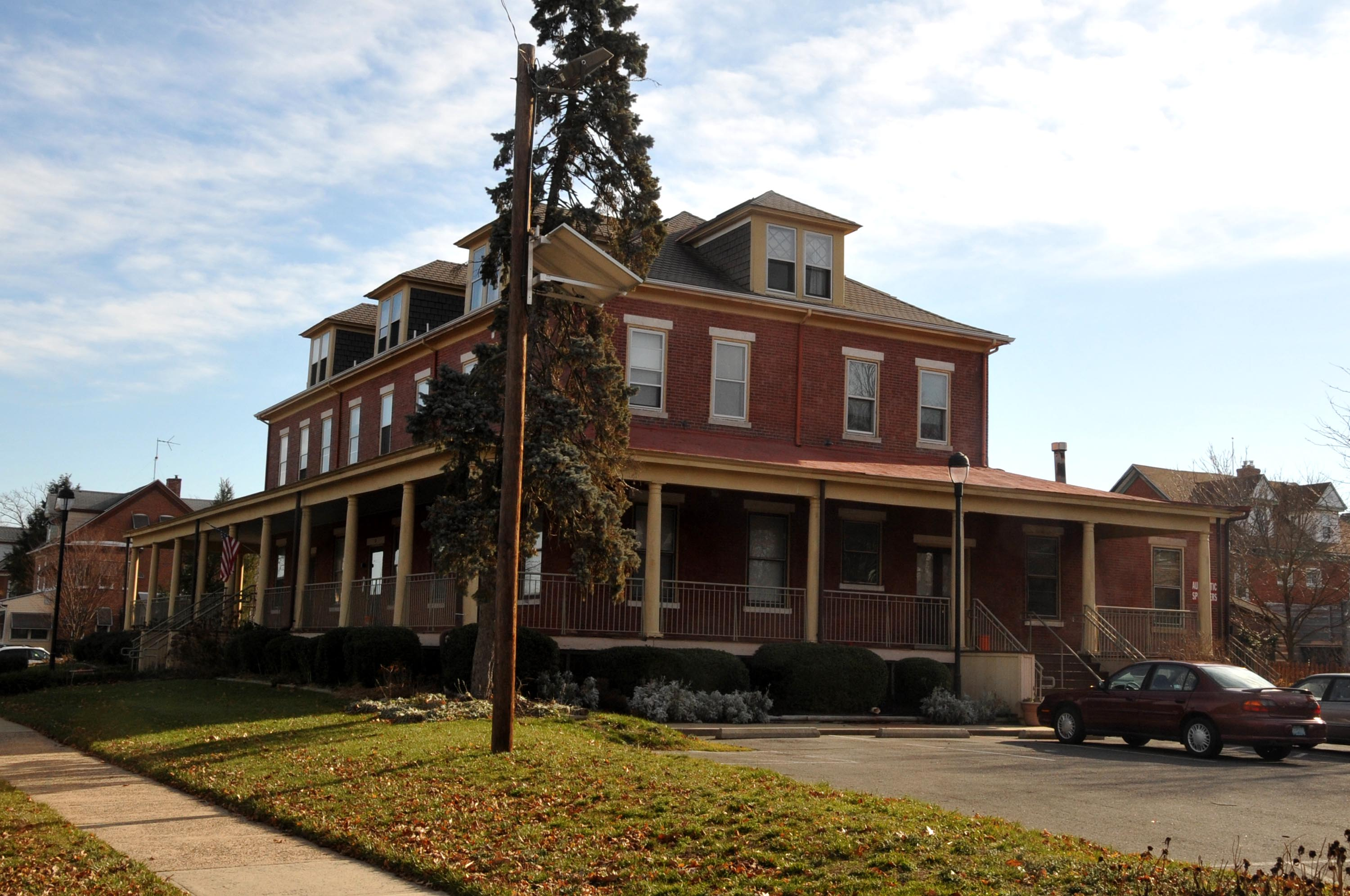
- Roebling Village Tavern
- Location: Roughly bounded by Roebling Park, South Street, 2nd and 8th Avenues, Roland Street, Alden, Norman Railroad, and Amboy Avenues
- Area: 76 acres (31 ha)
- Architectural style: Late Victorian
- NRHP reference No.: 78001748
- NJRHP No.: 813

Significant dates
- Added to NRHP: May 22, 1978
- Designated NJRHP: May 5, 1976

The Roebling Historic District is a 76-acre (31 ha) historic district roughly bounded by Roebling Park, South Street, 2nd and 8th Avenues, Roland Street, Alden, Norman Railroad, and Amboy Avenues in the community. It was added to the National Register of Historic Places on May 22, 1978, for its significance in architecture, commerce, industry, community planning, and immigrant experience. The district includes 94 contributing buildings.

== Transportation ==
The River Line offers service to Camden and Trenton Rail Station, with stations in Roebling at Hornberger Avenue and Florence at U.S. Route 130.

New Jersey Transit provides service to and from Philadelphia on the 409.

== Education ==
The school district is Florence Township School District.

== Notable people ==
People who were born in, residents of, or otherwise closely associated with Roebling include:

- Heath Fillmyer (born 1994), professional baseball pitcher for the Kansas City Royals.
- Gia Maione (1941–2013), singer who was the wife of singer Louis Prima.
- John A. Roebling, created the steel for the Brooklyn Bridge and the Golden Gate Bridge

== See also ==
- National Register of Historic Places listings in Burlington County, New Jersey
