= Heath Fillmyer =

American baseball player (born 1994)

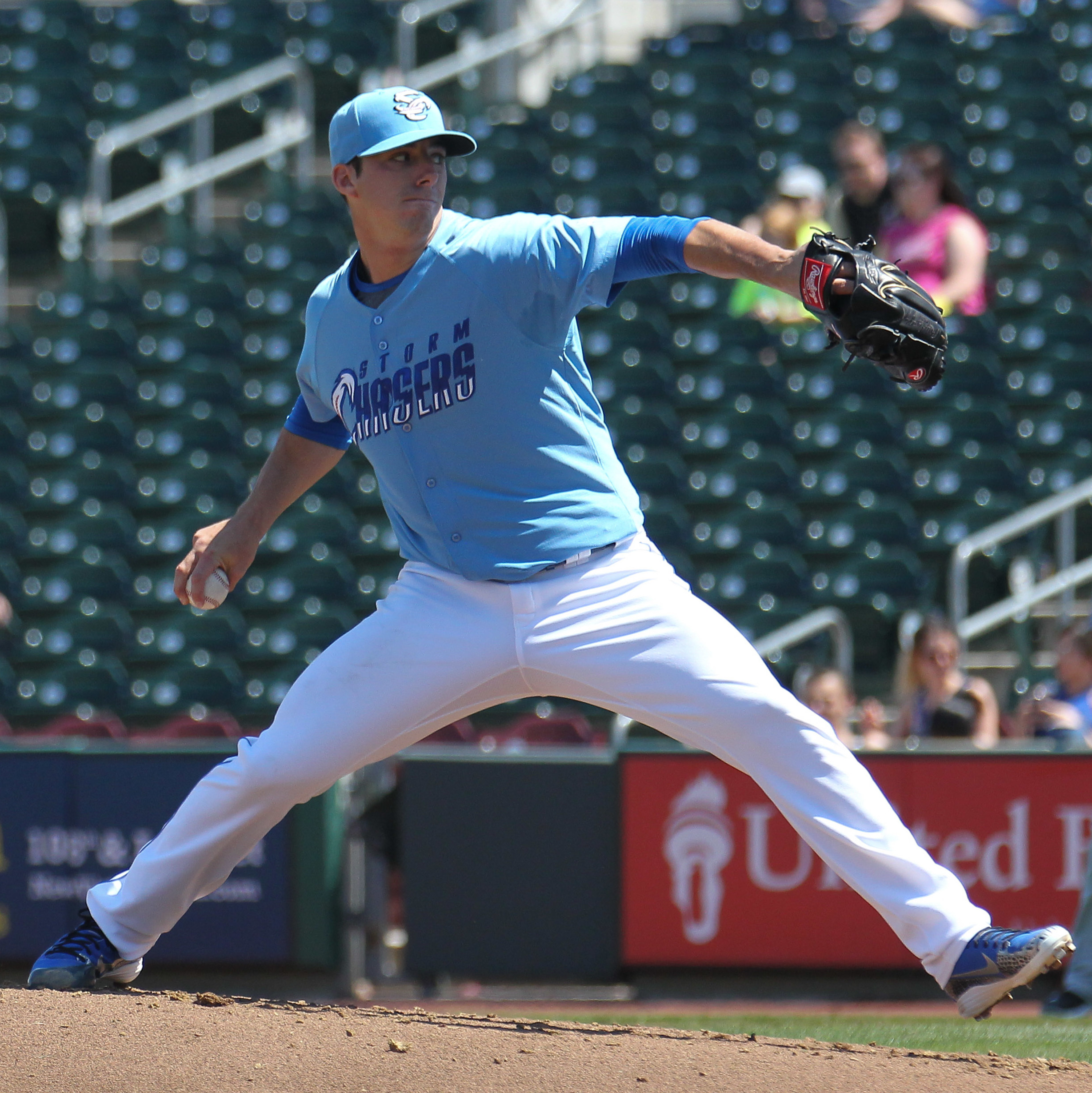
- Fillmyer with the Storm Chasers in 2018
- Pitcher
- Born: May 16, 1994 (age 32); Roebling, New Jersey, U.S.
- Batted: Right Threw: Right

MLB debut
- June 24, 2018, for the Kansas City Royals

Last MLB appearance
- September 25, 2019, for the Kansas City Royals

MLB statistics
- Win–loss record: 4–4
- Earned run average: 5.07
- Strikeouts: 72
- Stats at Baseball Reference

Teams
- Kansas City Royals (2018–2019)

Heath Devon Fillmyer (born May 16, 1994) is an American former professional baseball pitcher. He played in Major League Baseball (MLB) for the Kansas City Royals from 2018 to 2019.

== Playing career ==
A resident of the Roebling section in Florence Township, New Jersey, Fillmyer attended Florence Township Memorial High School and played college baseball at Mercer County Community College. He was drafted by the Colorado Rockies in the 28th round of the 2013 Major League Baseball draft, but did not sign and returned to Mercer County.

=== Oakland Athletics ===
He was then drafted by the Oakland Athletics in the fifth round of the 2014 MLB draft.

Fillmyer made his professional debut with the Arizona League Athletics, going 1–0 with a 2.79 ERA in six games, and pitched 2015 with the Beloit Snappers, where he posted a 3–13 record with a 4.98 ERA in 23 games. He started 2016 with the Stockton Ports and was promoted to the Double-A Midland RockHounds during the season; he went a combined 7–6 record with a 3.29 ERA. In 2017, he pitched for Midland, posting an 11–5 record with a 3.49 ERA. The Athletics added him to their 40-man roster after the season.

=== Kansas City Royals ===
On January 29, 2018, Fillmyer and Jesse Hahn were traded to the Kansas City Royals in exchange for Brandon Moss and Ryan Buchter. On June 19, the Royals called up Fillmyer. He made his major league debut on June 24, pitching four innings of mop-up duty in an 11–3 loss against the Houston Astros. Fillmyer was permanently made a part of the Royals’ rotation on July 23, where he made 12 starts. He finished the season with a 4.26 ERA. His finest start of the 2018 season came on August 9, when he threw seven shutout innings against the Chicago Cubs. He also collected his first Major League hit on September 26, an RBI double off of Cincinnati Reds reliever Matt Wisler.

Fillmyer spent most of the 2019 season in the minors, although he did see some limited major league action. On January 22, 2020, Fillmyer was designated for assignment to make room for Alex Gordon on the roster.

On August 18, 2020, Fillmyer was released by the Royals organization.

=== Lancaster Barnstormers ===
On March 3, 2021, Fillmyer signed a minor league contract with the Arizona Diamondbacks organization On March 30, the Diamondbacks released Fillmyer.

On May 3, 2021, Fillmyer signed with the Lancaster Barnstormers of the Atlantic League of Professional Baseball. Fillmyer pitched six innings of one-run ball with nine strikeouts in the first game of the season for Lancaster, his only appearance with the club.

=== Cleveland Indians ===
On May 30, 2021, Fillmyer's contract was purchased by the Cleveland Indians organization and he was assigned to the Triple-A Columbus Clippers. In 21 games (16 starts) for Columbus, he posted a 4–7 record and 6.18 ERA with 79 strikeouts in 83.0 innings of work. Fillmyer elected free agency following the season on November 7.

=== San Diego Padres ===
On November 15, 2021, Fillmyer signed a minor league contract with the San Diego Padres organization. In 5 games for the Triple–A El Paso Chihuahuas, he struggled a 7.56 ERA with 8 strikeouts in 8 1/3 innings pitched. He elected free agency following the season on November 10, 2022.

== Coaching career ==
On November 10, 2023, Fillmyer was hired to serve as a pitching and on–field instructor for Centercourt Baseball.
