= Florence Township, New Jersey =

Township in Burlington County, New Jersey, US

- Township
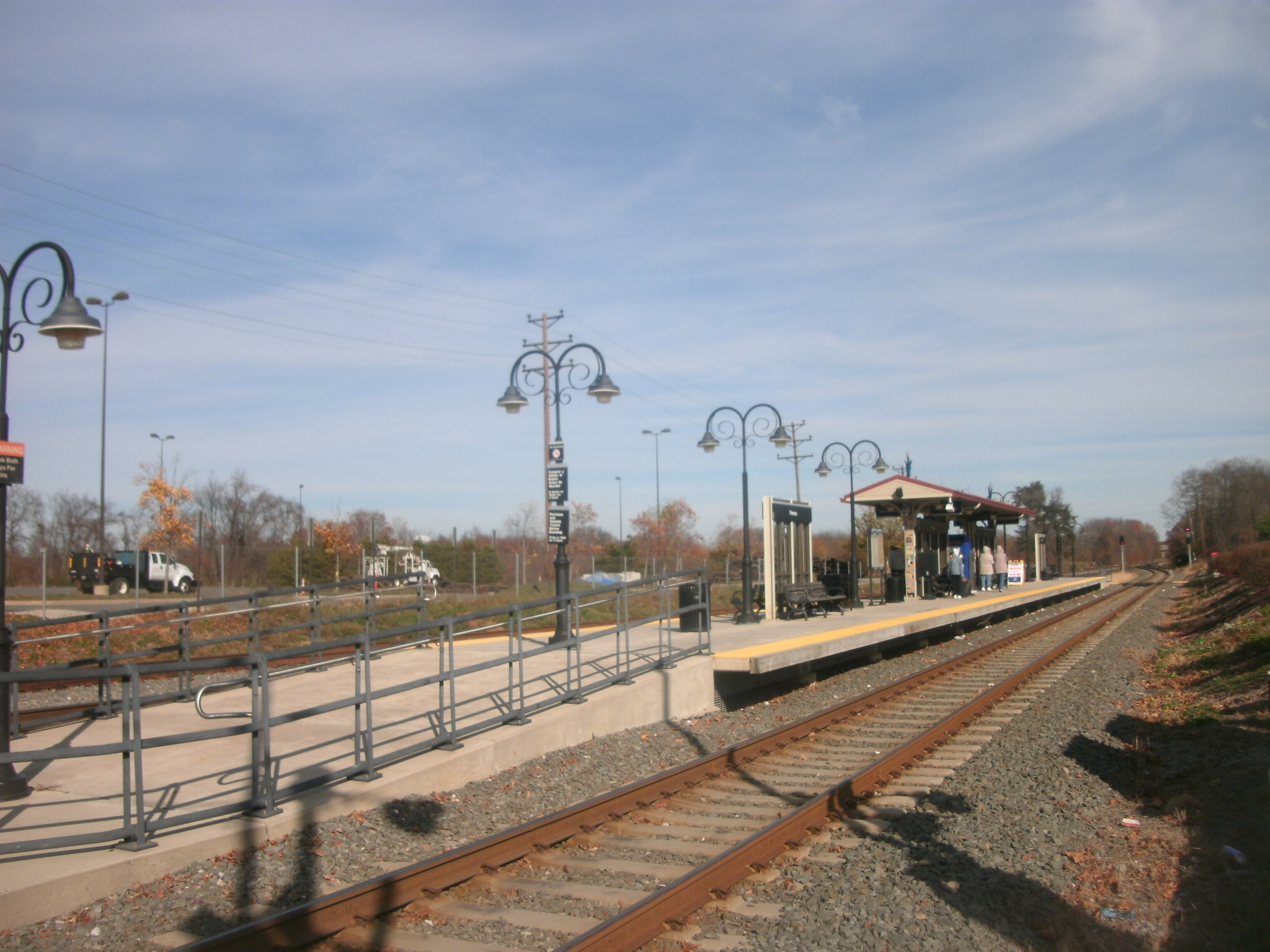
- Florence rail station, a stop along the River Line of NJ Transit in the township

- Seal

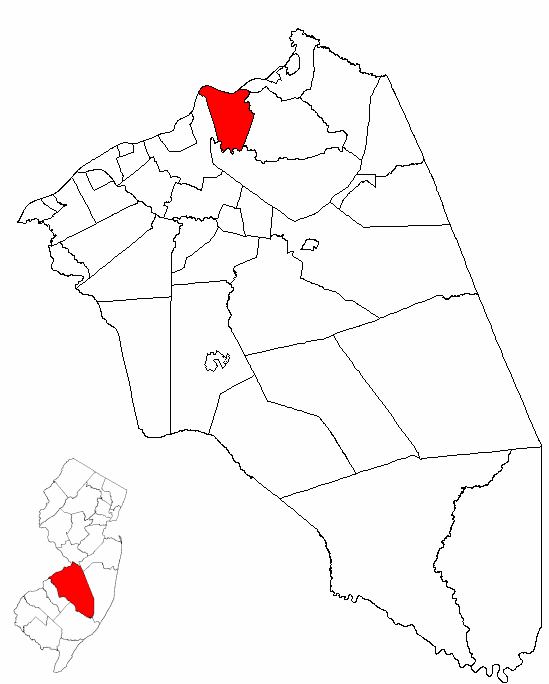
- Location of Florence Township in Burlington County highlighted in red (right). Inset map: Location of Burlington County in New Jersey highlighted in red (left).

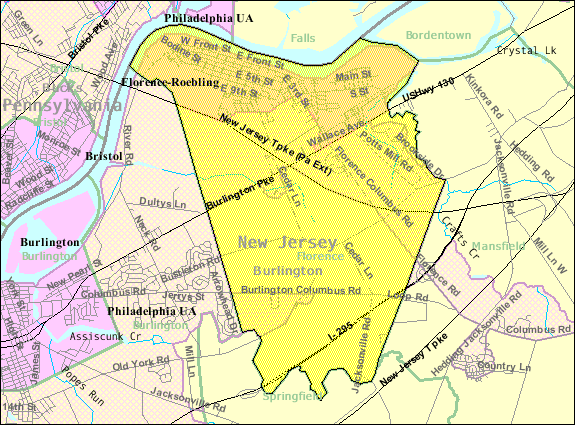
- Census Bureau map of Florence Township, New Jersey
- Interactive map of Florence Township, New Jersey
- Location in Burlington County Location in New Jersey Location in the United States
- Coordinates: 40.094687°N 74.783944°W
- Country: United States
- State: New Jersey
- County: Burlington
- Incorporated: March 7, 1872
- Named for: Florence, Italy

Government
  - Type: Faulkner Act (mayor–council)
  - Body: Township Council
  - Mayor: Kristan I. Marter (D, term ends December 31, 2027)
  - Administrator: Stephen Fazekas
  - Municipal clerk: Nancy L. Erlston

Area
  - Total: 10.17 sq mi (26.35 km^{2})
  - Land: 9.77 sq mi (25.30 km^{2})
  - Water: 0.41 sq mi (1.05 km^{2}) 3.98%
  - Rank: 210th of 565 in state 20th of 40 in county
- Elevation: 39 ft (12 m)

Population (2020)
  - Total: 12,812
  - Estimate (2023): 12,895
  - Rank: 198th of 565 in state 11th of 40 in county
  - Density: 1,311.5/sq mi (506.4/km^{2})
  - Rank: 354th of 565 in state 22nd of 40 in county
- Time zone: UTC−05:00 (Eastern (EST))
  - Summer (DST): UTC−04:00 (Eastern (EDT))
- ZIP Code: 08518
- Area code: 609 exchange: 499
- FIPS code: 3400523850
- GNIS feature ID: 0882107
- Website: www.florence-nj.gov

Florence Township is a township in Burlington County, in the U.S. state of New Jersey. As of the 2020 United States census, the township's population was 12,812, an increase of 703 (+5.8%) from the 2010 census count of 12,109, which in turn reflected an increase of 1,363 (+12.7%) from the 10,746 counted in the 2000 census. The township, and all of Burlington County, is a part of the Philadelphia metropolitan area.

Florence was incorporated as a township by an act of the New Jersey Legislature on March 7, 1872, from portions of Mansfield Township. The township was named for Florence, Italy.

== History ==
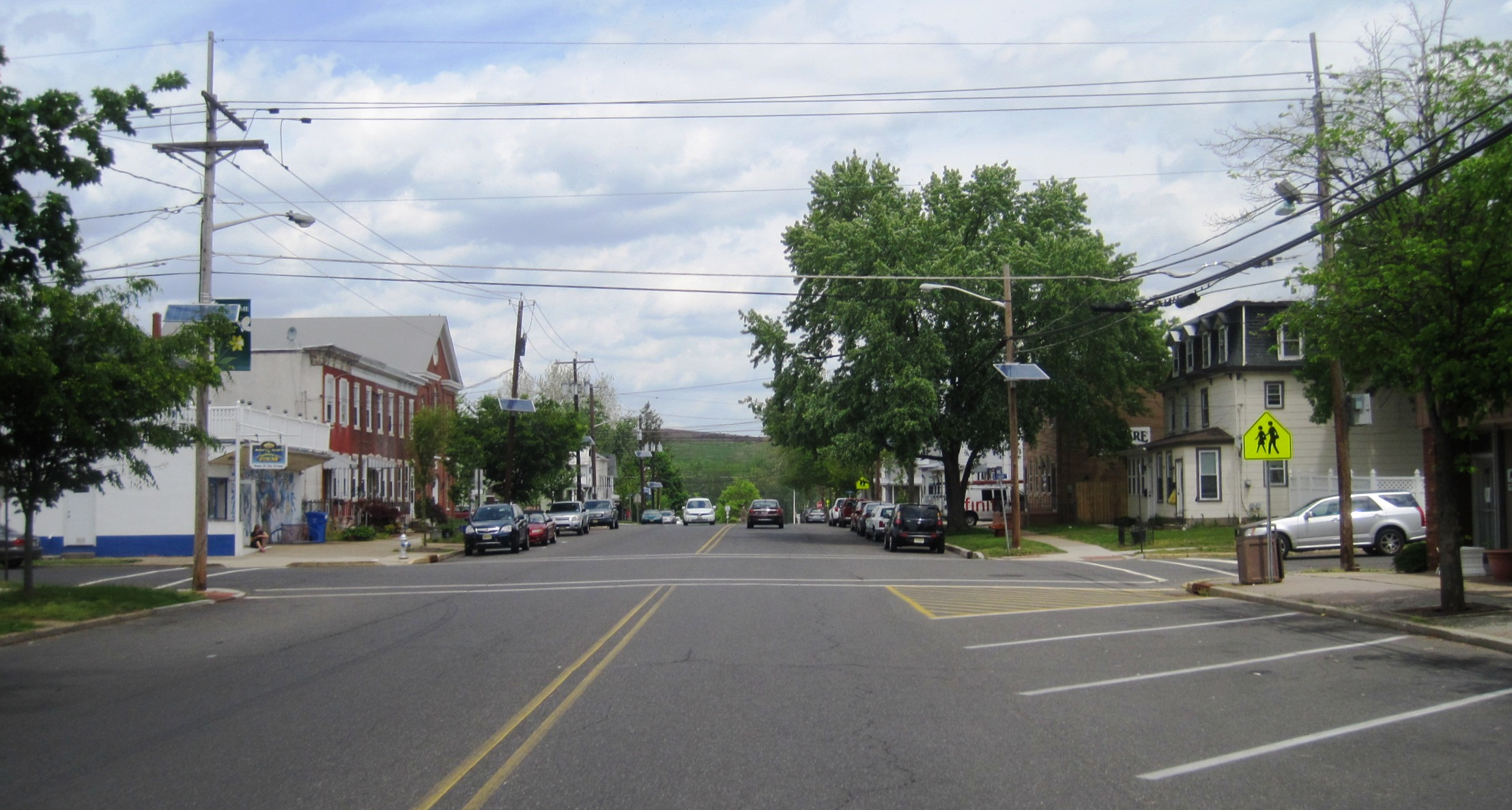
The business district of Florence Township

The Florence City Company, formed in 1849, organized the original layout of lots and streets in Florence. It also oversaw construction of the Florence Hotel and wharf. The Florence Iron Works was established in 1857 along the Delaware River by Richard Jones. It continued as a major force in the economy of the community, especially after ownership was transferred to Richard D. Wood in 1867. The 1900 United States census reported that a good portion of the workforce was dependent on the foundry.

Florence was soon recognized as an attractive vacation spot with sandy beaches along the Delaware River. Visitors could also partake of hydrotherapy offered by a center established about 1872 by Dr. Trall of Philadelphia.

== Geography ==
According to the United States Census Bureau, the township had a total area of 10.17 square miles (26.35 km^{2}), including 9.77 square miles (25.30 km^{2}) of land and 0.41 square miles (1.05 km^{2}) of water (3.98%).

Florence CDP (with a 2020 Census population of 4,705) and Roebling (3,585) are unincorporated communities and census-designated places (CDPs) located within the township. As of the 2000 Census, the CDP's population was 8,200. Up to and including the 2000 United States census, the two CDPs had been combined as Florence-Roebling, which had a total population of 8,200 in 2000.

Other unincorporated communities, localities and place names located partially or completely within the township include Bustleton, Dobbins, Florence Station and Hoffner's Tract.

The township borders Bordentown Township, Burlington Township, Mansfield Township, Springfield Township in Burlington County; and Bristol Township, Falls Township and Tullytown across the Delaware River in Pennsylvania.

== Demographics ==
Historical population
Census	Pop.	Note	%±
1880	1,528		—
1890	1,922		25.8%
1900	1,955		1.7%
1910	4,731		142.0%
1920	7,100		50.1%
1930	7,824		10.2%
1940	7,229		−7.6%
1950	7,455		3.1%
1960	8,127		9.0%
1970	8,560		5.3%
1980	9,084		6.1%
1990	10,266		13.0%
2000	10,746		4.7%
2010	12,109		12.7%
2020	12,812		5.8%
2023 (est.)	12,895	▲	0.6%
Population sources: 1880–2000; 1880–1920 1880–1890; 1890–1910 1910–1930; 1940–2000 2000; 2010 2020

=== 2010 census ===
The Census Bureau's 2020-2024 American Community Survey counted 12,935 people, 4,869 households, and 3,285 families in the township. The population density was 1,325.3 per square mile (511.7/km^{2}). There were 5,076 housing units, of which 4,869 were occupied (95.9%). The racial makeup was 59.1% (7,641) White, 11.3% (1,460) Black or African American, 0.1% (13) Native American, 12.2% (1,560) Asian, 0.2% (28) from other races, and 6.5% (838) from two or more races. Hispanic or Latino of any race were 10.6% (1,375) of the population.

Of the 4,869 households, 26.2% had children under the age of 18; 46.1% were married couples living together; 15.6% had a female householder with no husband present, and 32.4% were non-families. Of all households, 27.3% were made up of individuals and 37.6% had someone living alone who was 65 years of age or older. The average household size was 2.7.

24.1% of the population were under the age of 18, 7.0% from 18 to 24, 23.0% from 25 to 44, 25.5% from 45 to 64, and 20.4% who were 65 years of age or older. The median age was 40.8 years. The population was 52.6% female and 47.4% male.

In 2024 inflation-adjusted dollars, median household income was $105,631 (with a margin of error of +/− $9,549) and the median family income was $122,022 (+/− $21,958). Males had a median income of $65,351 (+/− $10,023) versus $42,731 (+/− $4,943) for females. The per capita income for the borough was $49,277 (+/− $6,858). About 2.4% of families and 5.7% of the population were below the poverty line, including 1.5% of those under age 18 and 1.2% of those age 60 or over.

=== 2000 census ===
As of the 2000 United States census there were 10,746 people, 4,149 households, and 2,891 families residing in the township. The population density was 1,106.5 inhabitants per square mile (427.2/km^{2}). There were 4,391 housing units at an average density of 452.1 per square mile (174.6/km^{2}). The racial makeup of the township was 85.52% White, 9.74% African American, 0.18% Native American, 2.35% Asian, 0.01% Pacific Islander, 0.65% from other races, and 1.54% from two or more races. Hispanic or Latino of any race were 2.35% of the population.

There were 4,149 households, out of which 33.0% had children under the age of 18 living with them, 51.9% were married couples living together, 13.1% had a female householder with no husband present, and 30.3% were non-families. 25.0% of all households were made up of individuals, and 9.0% had someone living alone who was 65 years of age or older. The average household size was 2.58 and the average family size was 3.10.

In the township the population was spread out, with 25.2% under the age of 18, 7.5% from 18 to 24, 31.9% from 25 to 44, 23.6% from 45 to 64, and 11.9% who were 65 years of age or older. The median age was 37 years. For every 100 females, there were 91.7 males. For every 100 females age 18 and over, there were 87.1 males.

The median income for a household in the township was $56,843, and the median income for a family was $67,412. Males had a median income of $45,325 versus $31,215 for females. The per capita income for the township was $23,529. About 4.8% of families and 6.1% of the population were below the poverty line, including 6.3% of those under age 18 and 7.5% of those age 65 or over.

== Economy ==
Given the accessibility of Florence to various rail and highway corridors, the township's economy is tied to its evolving role as a center for logistics. Florence and nearby towns in Burlington County have become prominent regional warehouse centers, attracting corporations like Amazon to build such facilities there.

== Government ==
=== Local government ===
Florence Township is governed within the Faulkner Act (formally known as the Optional Municipal Charter Law) under Plan F of the Mayor-Council system of municipal government. implemented based on the recommendations of a Charter Study Commission as of January 1, 1972. The township is one of 71 municipalities (of the 564) statewide that use this form of government. The governing body is composed of the Mayor and the five-member Township Council. Voters participate in partisan elections held in odd-numbered years to choose a Mayor for a four-year term along with two councilmembers at-large and then two years later choose one councilmember from each of three wards for overlapping terms of four years. The legislative power is vested in the Council and the Executive power is vested in the Mayor. The Mayor appoints a professionally qualified business administrator with the advice and consent of Council.

As of 2023, the Mayor of Florence Township is Democrat Kristan I. Marter, whose terms of office ends December 31, 2027. Members of the Florence Township Council are Council President Joseph Frappolli (Ward 3; D, 2029), Council Vice President John Fratinardo (at-large; D, 2027), Talaya Loftin (at-large; D, 2027), Gina Sullivan (Ward 1; D, 2029), and Fred Gabriele (Ward 2; D, 2029).

The Township Administrator is Thomas A. Sahol and the Township Clerk is Nancy L. Erlston.

=== Federal, state and county representation ===
Florence Township is located in the 3rd Congressional District and is part of New Jersey's 7th state legislative district.

For the 119th United States Congress, New Jersey's 3rd congressional district is currently represented Herb Conaway (D, Delran Township). New Jersey is represented in the United States Senate by Democrats Cory Booker (Newark, term ends 2027) and Andy Kim (Moorestown, term ends 2031).

For the 2026–2027 session, the 7th legislative district of the New Jersey Legislature is represented in the State Senate by Troy Singleton (D, Palmyra) and in the General Assembly by Carol A. Murphy (D, Mount Laurel) and Balvir Singh (D, Burlington Township).

Burlington County is governed by a Board of County Commissioners comprised of five members who are chosen at-large in partisan elections to serve three-year terms of office on a staggered basis, with either one or two seats coming up for election each year; at an annual reorganization meeting, the board selects a director and deputy director from among its members to serve a one-year term. As of 2026, Burlington County's Commissioners are: Director Felicia Hopson (D, Willingboro Township, term as commissioner ends December 31, 2027; term as director ends 2026), Deputy Director Allison Eckel (D, Medford, term as commissioner ends 2028; term as deputy director ends 2026), Randy Brolo (D, Lumberton, 2026; elected to an unexpired term), Tyler Burrell (D, Delran Township, 2027) and Tom Pullion (D, Edgewater Park, 2026).

Burlington County's constitutional officers are Clerk Joanne Schwartz (D, Southampton Township, 2028), Sheriff James H. Kostoplis (D, Bordentown, 2028) and Surrogate Brian J. Carlin (D, Burlington Township, 2026).

=== Politics ===
United States presidential election results for Florence Township 2024 2020 2016 2012 2008 2004
Year	Republican		Democratic		Third party(ies)	
Year	No.	%	No.	%	No.	%
2024	2,837	44.95%	3,363	53.29%	111	1.76%
2020	3,177	43.53%	4,020	55.08%	101	1.38%
2016	2,832	46.21%	3,054	49.83%	243	3.96%
2012	2,539	42.51%	3,354	56.15%	80	1.34%
2008	2,656	44.53%	3,235	54.24%	73	1.22%
2004	2,682	49.51%	2,703	49.90%	32	0.59%

As of March 2011, there were a total of 7,543 registered voters in Florence Township, of which 2,237 (29.7% vs. 33.3% countywide) were registered as Democrats, 1,851 (24.5% vs. 23.9%) were registered as Republicans and 3,452 (45.8% vs. 42.8%) were registered as Unaffiliated. There were 3 voters registered as Libertarians or Greens. Among the township's 2010 Census population, 62.3% (vs. 61.7% in Burlington County) were registered to vote, including 80.1% of those ages 18 and over (vs. 80.3% countywide).

In the 2012 presidential election, Democrat Barack Obama received 3,354 votes here (55.7% vs. 58.1% countywide), ahead of Republican Mitt Romney with 2,539 votes (42.2% vs. 40.2%) and other candidates with 80 votes (1.3% vs. 1.0%), among the 6,021 ballots cast by the township's 7,971 registered voters, for a turnout of 75.5% (vs. 74.5% in Burlington County). In the 2008 presidential election, Democrat Barack Obama received 3,235 votes here (53.8% vs. 58.4% countywide), ahead of Republican John McCain with 2,656 votes (44.2% vs. 39.9%) and other candidates with 73 votes (1.2% vs. 1.0%), among the 6,015 ballots cast by the township's 7,452 registered voters, for a turnout of 80.7% (vs. 80.0% in Burlington County). In the 2004 presidential election, Democrat John Kerry received 2,703 votes here (49.7% vs. 52.9% countywide), ahead of Republican George W. Bush with 2,682 votes (49.3% vs. 46.0%) and other candidates with 32 votes (0.6% vs. 0.8%), among the 5,439 ballots cast by the township's 6,817 registered voters, for a turnout of 79.8% (vs. 78.8% in the whole county).

Gubernatorial election results for Florence Township
Year	Republican		Democratic		Third party(ies)	
Year	No.	%	No.	%	No.	%
2025	2,260	41.45%	3,169	58.11%	24	0.44%
2021	2,275	49.92%	2,252	49.42%	30	0.66%
2017	1,887	47.58%	1,988	50.13%	91	2.29%
2013	2,651	65.26%	1,365	33.60%	46	1.13%
2009	2,130	49.94%	1,866	43.75%	269	6.31%
2005	1,768	47.12%	1,792	47.76%	192	5.12%

In the 2013 gubernatorial election, Republican Chris Christie received 2,651 votes here (63.8% vs. 61.4% countywide), ahead of Democrat Barbara Buono with 1,365 votes (32.9% vs. 35.8%) and other candidates with 46 votes (1.1% vs. 1.2%), among the 4,153 ballots cast by the township's 7,975 registered voters, yielding a 52.1% turnout (vs. 44.5% in the county). In the 2009 gubernatorial election, Republican Chris Christie received 2,130 votes here (49.2% vs. 47.7% countywide), ahead of Democrat Jon Corzine with 1,866 votes (43.1% vs. 44.5%), Independent Chris Daggett with 217 votes (5.0% vs. 4.8%) and other candidates with 52 votes (1.2% vs. 1.2%), among the 4,332 ballots cast by the township's 7,538 registered voters, yielding a 57.5% turnout (vs. 44.9% in the county).

United States Senate election results for Florence Township1
Year	Republican		Democratic		Third party(ies)	
Year	No.	%	No.	%	No.	%
2024	2,391	39.72%	3,474	57.71%	155	2.57%
2018	2,465	48.00%	2,380	46.35%	290	5.65%
2012	2,423	42.96%	3,164	56.10%	53	0.94%
2006	1,602	48.08%	1,641	49.25%	89	2.67%

United States Senate election results for Florence Township2
Year	Republican		Democratic		Third party(ies)	
Year	No.	%	No.	%	No.	%
2020	3,043	42.91%	3,915	55.21%	133	1.88%
2014	1,644	50.28%	1,562	47.77%	64	1.96%
2013	1,443	58.14%	1,007	40.57%	32	1.29%
2008	2,465	45.79%	2,811	52.22%	107	1.99%

== Education ==
The Florence Township School District serves public school students in kindergarten through twelfth grade. As of the 2018–19 school year, the district, comprised of three schools, had an enrollment of 1,581 students and 128.1 classroom teachers (on an FTE basis), for a student–teacher ratio of 12.3:1. Schools in the district (with 2018–19 enrollment data from the National Center for Education Statistics) are Roebling Elementary School with 396 students in grades K–3, Riverfront Middle School with 694 students in grades 4–8 and Florence Township Memorial High School with 452 students in grades 9–12.

Students from Florence Township, and from all of Burlington County, are eligible to attend the Burlington County Institute of Technology, a countywide public school district that serves the vocational and technical education needs of students at the high school and post-secondary level at its campuses in Medford and Westampton.

== Media ==
WIFI, 1460 AM, is a radio station broadcasting out of Florence Township. It has an urban contemporary format.

== Transportation ==
=== Roads and highways ===
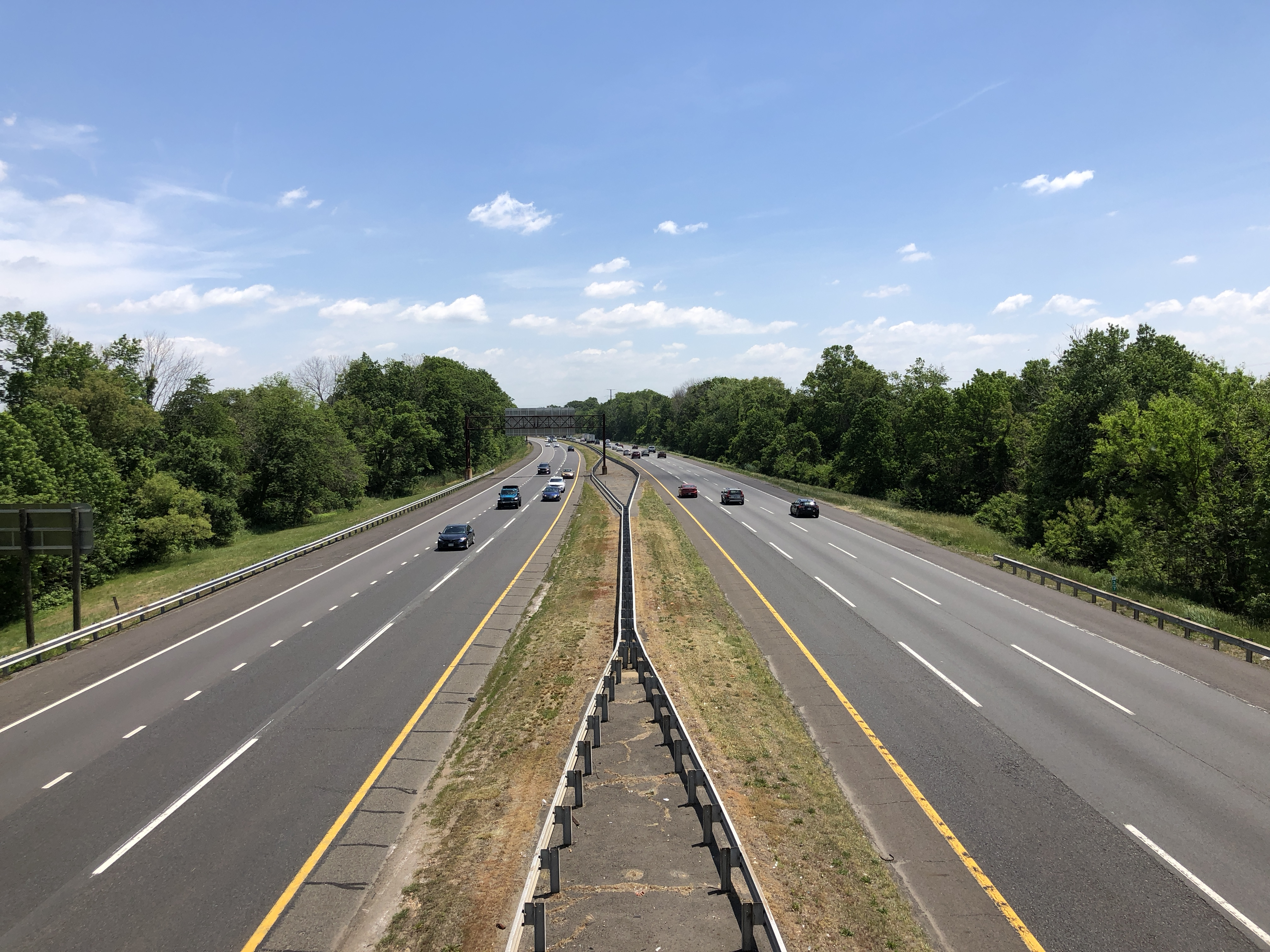
Northbound Interstate 95 (New Jersey Turnpike Pennsylvania Extension) in Florence

As of May 2010, the township had a total of 67.24 miles (108.21 km) of roadways, of which 45.31 miles (72.92 km) were maintained by the municipality, 14.11 miles (22.71 km) by Burlington County, 4.52 miles (7.27 km) by the New Jersey Department of Transportation and 3.30 miles (5.31 km) by the New Jersey Turnpike Authority.

Florence hosts a 3.3 miles (5.3 km) section of Interstate 95 (New Jersey Turnpike Pennsylvania Extension), which extends from the border with Burlington Township on the west side of the township to the border with Mansfield Township on the east. One interchange, known as "6A" but not actually signed with a number, connects I-95 with U.S. Route 130, which follows a southwest–northeast alignment through Florence. This interchange previously connected with Cedar Lane in an unusual roadway setup (where Cedar Lane overpasses itself) the locals termed the "whirlybird" until 1999, when the Authority constructed a double-trumpet interchange directly with US 130. The 6 toll gate is just east of Exit 6A on the Pennsylvania Extension. Interchange 6 (itself) is located in Mansfield Township.

Interstate 295 also passes through Florence Township, but the nearest interchanges are in Mansfield Township and Burlington Township. County Route 543 also traverses Florence, passing over Interstate 295 without an interchange.

=== Public transportation ===
The NJ Transit River Line light rail system offers service in the township at the Florence station at U.S. Route 130 and Roebling station at Hornberger Avenue providing southbound service to Camden and the Walter Rand Transportation Center (with transfers available to the PATCO Speedline) and northbound service to the Trenton Rail Station with connections to NJ Transit trains to New York City, SEPTA trains to Philadelphia, and Amtrak trains on the Northeast Corridor.

NJ Transit provides bus service on the 409 route between Trenton and Philadelphia.

BurLink bus service is offered on the B5 route between the Florence light rail station and Haines Industrial Center.

== Notable people ==
People who were born in, residents of, or otherwise closely associated with Florence Township include:

- Joseph Bodner (1925–1982), painter and illustrator
- John E. Dimon (1916–1993), member of the New Jersey Senate from 1991 until his death
- Heath Fillmyer (born 1994), professional baseball pitcher for the Kansas City Royals
- Adam Hughes (born 1967), comic book artist best known for his pinup-style renderings of female character including Wonder Woman and Catwoman
- Richard J. Hughes (1909–1992), politician who served as the 45th Governor of New Jersey, from 1962 to 1970 and as Chief Justice of the New Jersey Supreme Court from 1973 to 1979
- Wali Lundy (born 1983), running back who played in the NFL for the Houston Texans
- Gia Maione (1941–2013), singer who was the wife of singer Louis Prima
- Gene Olaff (born 1920), former U.S. Soccer goalkeeper and former Superintendent of the New Jersey State Police
- Scott Semptimphelter (born 1972), professional football quarterback who played for six seasons in the Arena Football League
- John A. Sweeney (born 1941), politician who served a single two-year term in the New Jersey General Assembly from 1974 to 1976
- Curtis Thompson (born 1996), track and field athlete who specializes in the javelin
