= Roebling Bridge =

Roebling Bridge may refer to:

- John A. Roebling Suspension Bridge, a bridge spanning the Ohio River between Cincinnati, Ohio, and Covington, Kentucky
- Roebling's Delaware Aqueduct, a bridge spanning the Delaware River between Lackawaxen, Pennsylvania, and Minisink Ford, New York
