= Joseph Bodner =

American painter (1925–1982)

Joseph Bodner (January 16, 1925 – May 28, 1982) was an American painter. He was born in Florence Township, New Jersey and served in the United States Army Air Forces during World War II. After the war, he studied at the Art Center College of Design in Pasadena, California where he specialized in illustration and fine art. He often chose the vanishing West and white stallions as favorite subjects but his painting "The Resurrection of Jonathan," which was exhibited at the motion picture premiere of Jonathan Livingston Seagull, is probably his best known work. As an illustrator, in 1978 he collaborated with Bruce Lee on the first volume of his Fighting Method martial arts books.

Bodner died in 1982 and was interred in the Holy Cross Cemetery in Culver City, California.
