= Florence Township Memorial High School =

Public secondary school in Burlington County, New Jersey, United States

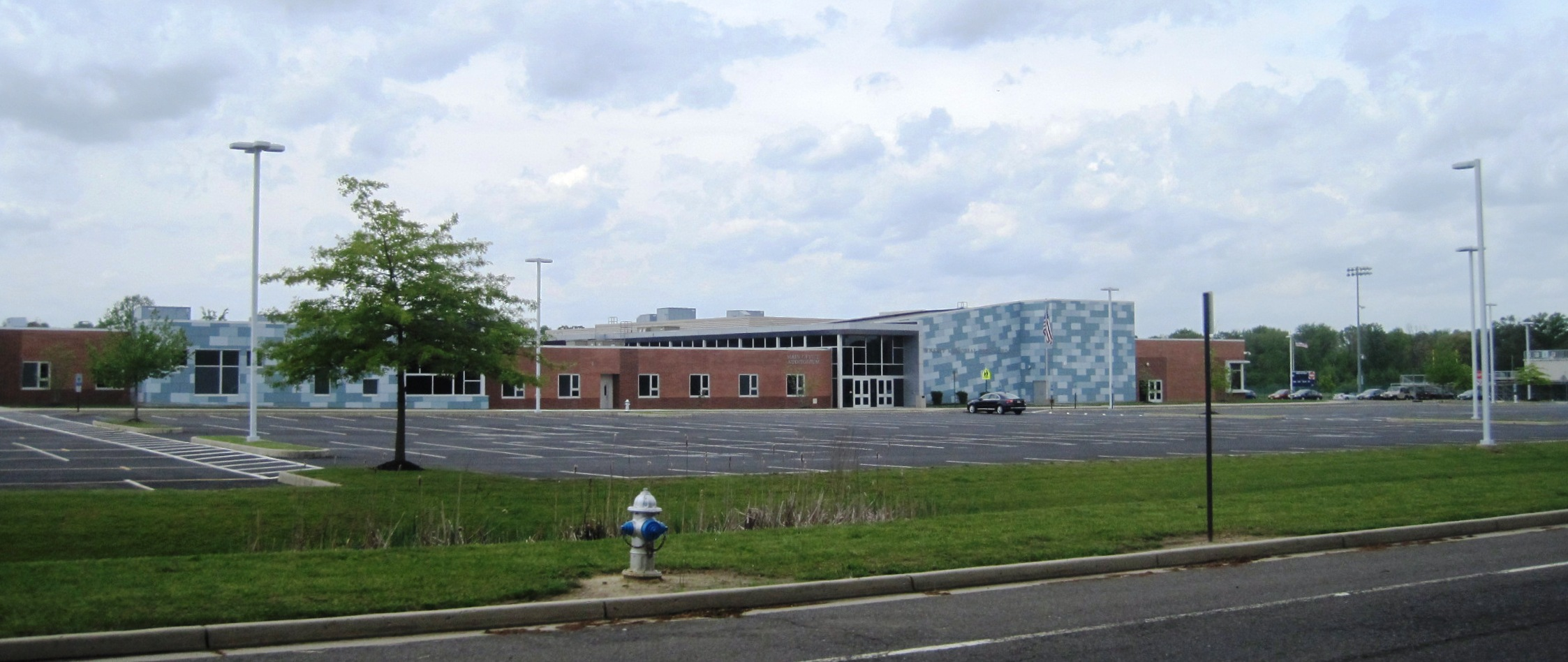

Location
- 1050 Cedar Lane; Florence Township, Burlington County, New Jersey 08518; United States; 40.091602°N 74.791634°W

Information
- Type: Public high school
- School district: Florence Township School District
- NCES School ID: 340522001082
- Principal: John M. Cogan
- Faculty: 38.0 FTEs
- Grades: 9-12
- Enrollment: 475 (as of 2024–25)
- Student to teacher ratio: 12.5:1
- Colors: Blue and Gold
- Athletics conference: Burlington County Scholastic League (general); West Jersey Football League (football)
- Team name: Flashes
- Rivals: Burlington City HS, Bordentown Regional HS, Palmyra HS, Burlington Twp. HS, Northern Burlington HS, New Egypt HS, Riverside HS
- Newspaper: The Florence Sentinel
- Website: School webpage

Florence Township Memorial High School is a comprehensive community public high school that serves students in ninth through twelfth grades from Florence Township, in Burlington County, in the U.S. state of New Jersey, operating as the lone secondary school of the Florence Township School District.

As of the 2024–25 school year, the school had an enrollment of 475 students and 38.0 classroom teachers (on an FTE basis), for a student–teacher ratio of 12.5:1. There were 152 students (32.0% of enrollment) eligible for free lunch and 40 (8.4% of students) eligible for reduced-cost lunch.

== Awards, recognition and rankings ==
The school was the 258th-ranked public high school in New Jersey out of 339 schools statewide in New Jersey Monthly magazine's September 2014 cover story on the state's "Top Public High Schools", using a new ranking methodology. The school had been ranked 220th in the state of 328 schools in 2012, after being ranked 237th in 2010 out of 322 schools listed. The magazine ranked the school 183rd in 2008 out of 316 schools. The school was ranked 209th in the magazine's September 2006 issue, which surveyed 316 schools across the state.

== Athletics ==
The Florence Township Memorial High School Flashes compete in the Burlington County Scholastic League, which is comprised of public and non-public high schools covering Burlington, Mercer and Ocean counties in Central Jersey, operating under the supervision of the New Jersey State Interscholastic Athletic Association (NJSIAA). With 336 students in grades 10-12, the school was classified by the NJSIAA for the 2019–20 school year as Group II for most athletic competition purposes, which included schools with an enrollment of 75 to 476 students in that grade range. The football team competes in the Classic Division of the 94-team West Jersey Football League superconference and was classified by the NJSIAA as Group I South for football for 2024–2026, which included schools with 185 to 482 students.

The school participates in a joint wrestling team with Bordentown Regional High School as the host school / lead agency. The co-op program operates under agreements scheduled to expire at the end of the 2023–24 school year.

The girls' field hockey team won the South Jersey Group I sectional title in 1984, 1992 and 1993, and won the Central Jersey Group I title in 2000. The team was Group I state champion in 1992. The 1992 team finished the season with a record of 19-3 after winning the Group I state title, defeating runner-up Belvidere High School by a score of 4-0 in the championship game at Trenton State College.

The football team won the South Jersey Group I state sectional championship in 1985, and won the Central Jersey Group I title in 2003-2006 and 2012. The 1985 team finished the season with a 10-1 record after winning the South Jersey Group I state championship game with a 19-18 win against a Burlington Township High School team that failed on a late two-point conversion attempt that would have given them the lead. A pair of late touchdowns provided the margin the 1986 team needed to defeat Keyport High School by a score of 21-14 to win the Central Jersey Group I sectional championship and finish the season at 12-0. The 2006 team won the Central Jersey Group I state championship by a final score of 17-6 against South River High School at Rutgers Stadium, marking the team's fourth consecutive sectional title, the second-highest number of titles (five) of any Burlington County school. The team finished the season 12-1 after winning the 2016 Central Jersey Group I sectional title with a 23-17 overtime win in the championship game against Shore Regional High School. Head coach Joe Frappolli entered the 2020 season with six sectional championships and an overall career record of 319-149-5 in his 47 years leading the team, ranked third in wins among all active football coaches.

The baseball team won the Group I state championship in 1985 (defeating Cresskill High School in the tournament final) and 1986 (vs. Roselle Park High School). In 2011 the team defeated South River High School by a score of 12-2, and in 2012 the team defeated Point Pleasant Beach High School, 4-2, to win back-to-back Central Jersey Group I state sectionals. The winning pitcher in both games was Greg Perri, who is the first and only pitcher to win back-to-back state sectional championships in school history.

The boys' basketball team won the Group I state championship in 1986 (vs. Glen Ridge High School in the tournament final), 2000 (vs. Waldwick High School) and 2001 (vs. Cresskill High School). Farcing Waldwick in the finals, the team won the Group I title by a score of 72-43. In 2001, the team won the Group I title with a 41-35 win against Cresskill in the tournament final. The team won the 2005 Central, Group I state sectional championship with a 64-50 win over Metuchen High School.

The softball team won the Group I state championship in 1987 (defeating Roselle Park High School in the tournament final) and 2007 (vs. Pompton Lakes High School). The team took the Central Jersey, Group I state sectional championship in 2007 with a pair of shutout wins, over Middlesex High School (6-0) in the semifinal and South Amboy Middle High School (3-0) in the tournament final. The team moved on to win the Group I state championship with wins over Gloucester City High School (3-2) in the semifinals and Pompton Lakes High School (3-0) in the tournament final. The team won the 2008 sectional title over Dunellen High School by a score of 10-0 in the final game. The 2008 team lost 9-1 to Pennsville Memorial High School in the first round of the Group I championships.

== Administration ==
The school's principal is John M. Cogan. His administration team includes two vice principals.

== Notable alumni ==
- Heath Fillmyer (born 1994), professional baseball pitcher for the San Diego Padres
- Wali Lundy (born 1983), running back who played in the NFL for the Houston Texans; he attended Florence Township Memorial High School for two years before transferring to Holy Cross High School
- Curtis Thompson (born 1996, class of 2014), track and field athlete who specializes in the javelin
