= Roebling Point =

Coordinates: 39°05′17″N 84°30′32″W

Roebling Point is an area of Covington, northern Kentucky, located at the foot of the John A. Roebling Suspension Bridge. This neighborhood is going through extensive changes. Since August 2007, The Ascent at Roebling's Bridge (luxury condos designed by Daniel Libeskind), has spurred on a rejuvenation of the neighborhood. Many bars and restaurants have opened there in the last year, Coco's Funk n' Blues Cafe, The Keystone Bar & Grill, Molly Malone's Irish Pub, The Down Under Tavern, Chalk, and Greenup Cafe are all located here.
