= Florence Township School District =

School district in Burlington County, New Jersey, US

Address
- 201 Cedar Street Florence Township, Burlington County, New Jersey, 08518; United States
- Coordinates: 40.117807°N 74.80513°W

District information
- Grades: Pre-K to 12
- Superintendent: Donna Ambrosius
- Business administrator: Luis Valencia
- Schools: 3

Students and staff
- Enrollment: 1,581 (as of 2018–19)
- Faculty: 128.1 FTEs
- Student–teacher ratio: 12.3:1

Other information
- District Factor Group: DE
- Website: www.florence.k12.nj.us
Ind.	Per pupil	District spending	Rank (*)	K-12 average	%± vs. average
1A	Total Spending	$18,427	29	$18,891	−2.5%
1	Budgetary Cost	11,871	6	14,783	−19.7%
2	Classroom Instruction	6,718	4	8,763	−23.3%
6	Support Services	1,606	6	2,392	−32.9%
8	Administrative Cost	1,396	6	1,485	−6.0%
10	Operations & Maintenance	1,862	38	1,783	4.4%
13	Extracurricular Activities	289	5	268	7.8%
16	Median Teacher Salary	64,610	34	64,043
Data from NJDoE 2014 Taxpayers' Guide to Education Spending. *Of K-12 districts with up to 1,800 students. Lowest spending=1; Highest=49

The Florence Township School District is a comprehensive community public school district that serves students in pre-kindergarten through twelfth grade from Florence Township, in Burlington County, in the U.S. state of New Jersey.

As of the 2018–19 school year, the district, comprising three schools, had an enrollment of 1,581 students and 128.1 classroom teachers (on an FTE basis), for a student–teacher ratio of 12.3:1.

The district is classified by the New Jersey Department of Education as being in District Factor Group "DE", the fifth-highest of eight groupings. District Factor Groups organize districts statewide to allow comparison by common socioeconomic characteristics of the local districts. From lowest socioeconomic status to highest, the categories are A, B, CD, DE, FG, GH, I and J.

== History ==
In 1948, during de jure educational segregation in the United States, the district had two schools for black children.

== Schools ==
Schools in the district (with 2018–19 enrollment data from the National Center for Education Statistics) are:

Elementary schools

- Roebling Elementary School with 396 students in grades PreK-3
  - Barb Fazekas, principal

Middle school

- Riverfront Middle School with 694 students in grades 4–8
  - Jaime Mungo, principal

High school

- Florence Township Memorial High School with 452 students in grades 9–12
  - John M. Cogan, principal

== Administration ==
Core members of the district's administration are:

- Donna Ambrosius, superintendent
- Luis Valencia, business administrator and board secretary

== Board of education ==
The district's board of education, composed of nine members, sets policy and oversees the fiscal and educational operation of the district through its administration. As a Type II school district, the board's trustees are elected directly by voters to serve three-year terms of office on a staggered basis, with three seats up for election each year held (since 2012) as part of the November general election. The board appoints a superintendent to oversee the district's day-to-day operations and a business administrator to supervise the business functions of the district.
