= John A. Roebling Suspension Bridge =

Suspension bridge across the Ohio River

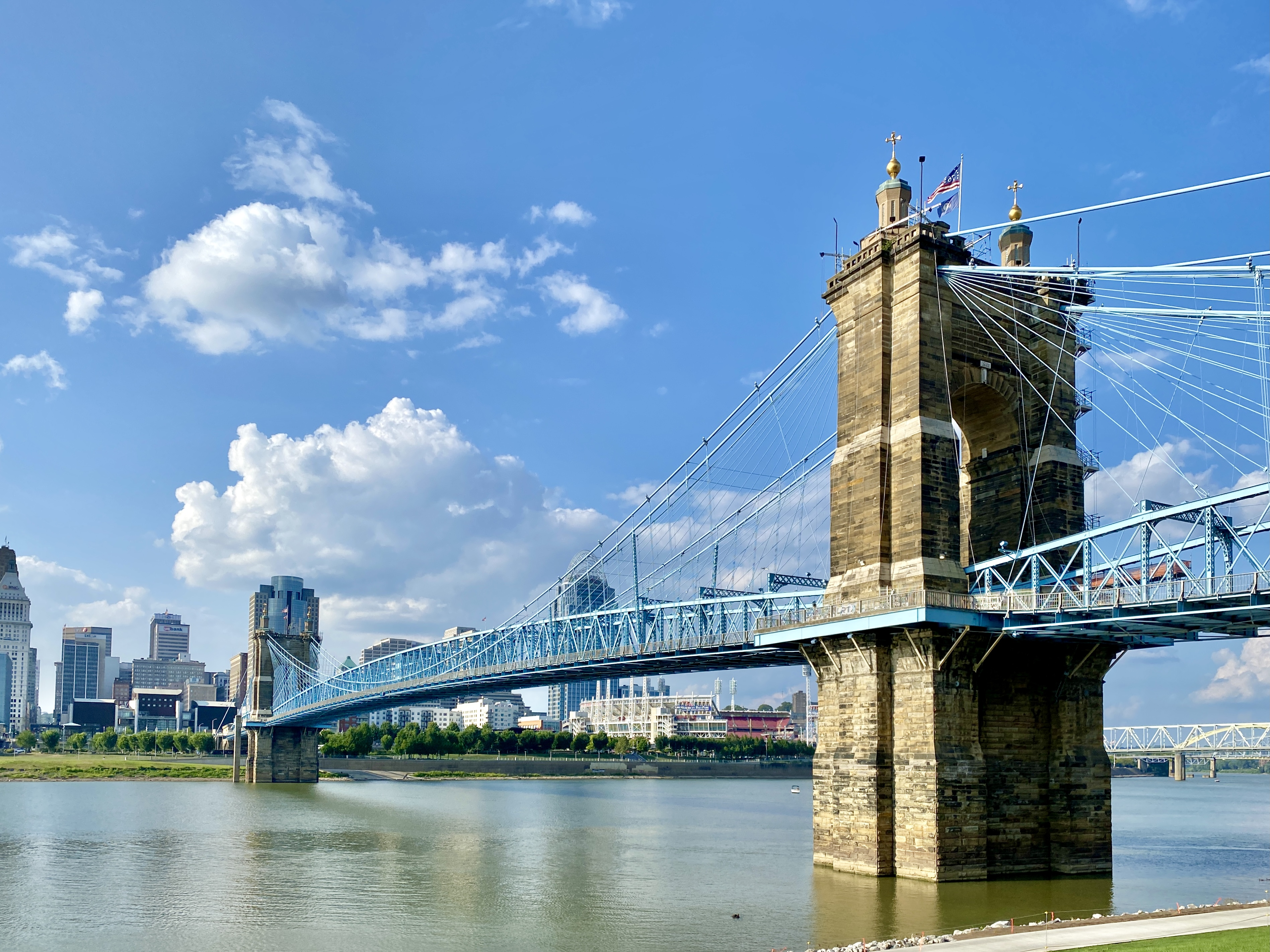
- View from Covington, Kentucky, towards Cincinnati, 2021
- Coordinates: 39°5′32.03″N 84°30′34.45″W
- Carries: KY 17
- Crosses: Ohio River
- Locale: Cincinnati (Downtown Cincinnati – Covington, Kentucky)
- Other name(s): Singing Bridge, Covington and Cincinnati Suspension Bridge
- Maintained by: Kentucky Transportation Cabinet

Characteristics
- Design: Cable-stayed suspension bridge
- Total length: 1,642 ft 11 in (500.8 m)
- Longest span: 1,057 ft (322 m)
- Clearance below: 100 ft (30 m) in 1867. Current clearance at normal pool: 74 ft (23 m)

History
- Designer: John A. Roebling
- Opened: January 1, 1867; 159 years ago
- Covington and Cincinnati Suspension Bridge
- U.S. National Register of Historic Places
- U.S. National Historic Landmark
- Built: 1856–1867
- Architectural style: Gothic Revival
- NRHP reference No.: 75000786

Significant dates
- Added to NRHP: May 15, 1975
- Designated NHL: May 15, 1975

Location
- Interactive map of John A. Roebling Suspension Bridge

The John A. Roebling Suspension Bridge (formerly the Cincinnati-Covington Bridge) is a suspension bridge that spans the Ohio River between Cincinnati, Ohio, and Covington, Kentucky. When opened to traffic on January 1, 1867, it was the longest suspension bridge in the world at 1,057 feet (322 m) main span, before being overtaken by the Niagara Clifton Bridge, which was later surpassed by John A. Roebling's most famous design of the 1883 Brooklyn Bridge at 1,595.5 feet (486.3 m). Pedestrians use the bridge to get between the hotels, bars, restaurants, and other amenities in Northern Kentucky. The bar and restaurant district at the foot of the bridge on the Kentucky side is known as Roebling Point.

== Planning and charter ==
In the mid-19th century, need of a passage over the Ohio River became apparent. Commerce between Ohio and Kentucky had increased to the point that the highly congested steamboat traffic was constricting the economy. A solution that would not constrict traffic on the river even further was a wire cable suspension bridge of the type developed by French engineers. Several American engineers had begun designing and building suspension bridges. One of these men was John A. Roebling of Saxonburg, Pennsylvania. The Ohio River, however, was much wider than any river that had been bridged in France.

The Covington and Cincinnati Bridge Company was incorporated in February 1846, and the company asked Roebling to plan a bridge. The brief outline of his ideas called for a 1,200-foot (370 m) span with 100 feet (30 m) of clearance at high water to allow steamboats to pass unobstructed, but it included a monumental tower in the middle of the river. Steamboat and ferry interest groups lobbied against this plan. They feared an obstructed waterway, loss of a ferry market, and depreciation of property. The Ohio legislature refused the charter of the bridge. In September, Roebling published a 36-page report containing a technical discussion and an analysis of said problems. He attacked steamboat operators for using oversized chimneys, speculated on future commercial interests, and surmised on the importance of spanning western rivers. Roebling also specified that the company should make the decision as to the placement of the bridge along the river. Still, no charter was granted.

After observing the construction of a suspension bridge upriver, in Wheeling, Virginia (later West Virginia), the legislature relented and passed the charter, mandating excessive dimensions such as a 1,400 feet (430 m) main span and requesting that the legislature determine the bridge location. This latter provision would later be regretted by everyone involved. The roads of Cincinnati and Covington were laid collinear with each other, in the hope that a bridge would be built sometime in the future. When the Ohio legislature decided to choose its own location for the bridge, it failed to pick such an obvious spot, hoping to defend Cincinnati's preeminence over Newport and Covington, the rival Kentucky cities. The bridge was actually located almost entirely in Kentucky because the state boundary follows the north bank of the river. It deprived Cincinnati forever of one of "the finest and most magnificent avenues on this continent."

In 1854, a small suspension bridge over the Licking River at Newport, Kentucky, collapsed. This event deterred investors, and the bridge company could not raise enough money to start construction. Amos Shinkle was elected to the board of trustees in 1856. He brought with him a much needed boost of energy. Shinkle immediately managed to find new private investors and to procure more support from both the Ohio and Kentucky governments. During this time the bridge charter was revised, and the span of the bridge was reduced to a minimum of 1,000 feet (300 m). By now, Roebling had established a reputation. President Ramson of the bridge company traveled to see Roebling, who was in Iowa, and he secured a contract to build the bridge. In September, Roebling arrived in Cincinnati, and much to his disgust, nothing was prepared.

== Construction ==
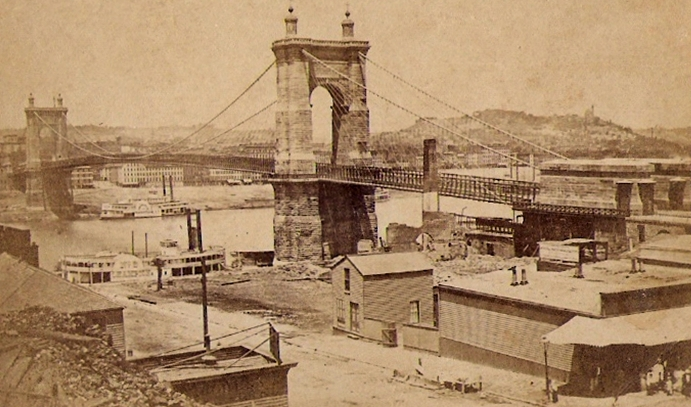
Carte de visite of the "Suspension Bridge Cincinnati" (from a stamp on the back), taken from Covington looking toward Cincinnati, ca. 1870

Excavation for the foundation of the Covington tower commenced in September 1856 and went smoothly. A foundation was set consisting of 13 layers of oak beams, each layer set perpendicular to the one beneath it, bolted with iron hardware, and finally all cemented into place. On the Cincinnati side, work was delayed from the start. The construction crews could not pump water out of the excavating pit fast enough. After months of little progress, Roebling decided against buying costly machinery or bigger engines for his pumps and, quite last minute, designed his own square positive displacement pumps from three-inch (76 mm) pine planks. He built them locally in about forty-eight hours and ran them off of one of Amos Shinkles' tugboats, the Champion No.1. The homemade pumps displaced forty gallons of mud and clay in each cycle.

When the crews reached the compacted gravel bed of the Ohio River, Roebling decided this would be sufficient for the foundation of the Cincinnati tower. Oak timbers were laid, mirroring the foundation of the Covington tower, and within three months, masonry on both towers reached above the waterline (which, at this time, was at a record low for the fall). Work halted for the freezing temperatures and increased water level, a practice which continued seasonally until completion of the bridge. At this time, a revised contract was drawn up, stating work was to be completed by December 1858, barring "unavoidable calamities".

After a hard winter of 1856–57, and a wet spring, construction resumed in July 1857. Sandstone was used for the first twenty five vertical feet of each tower base. Limestone encased this sandstone to protect against scour and collision from watercraft. The remaining height of each tower was to be constructed of sandstone, rough cut and with a large draft. Roebling said this gave the towers "a massive look, quite suitable to their function."

Working from July to August 1857, the company was without liquid funds, a problem compounded by the Panic of 1857. Work halted because of the inability to pay for the project. In July 1858, operations resumed again, albeit with a smaller workforce. Only one tower was worked on at a time. President Ramson of the company died, and no work was done during the years 1859–60.

In November 1860, Abraham Lincoln was elected president of the United States, and the Civil War began in January 1861. Upon a threatened siege of Cincinnati from Confederate forces, a pontoon bridge was built to span the Ohio River, allowing Union troops to cross and construct defenses. Soon after, once it had become obvious that a permanent structure was vital, money from investors came pouring in. Bonds were sold, and in January 1863 materials began arriving. In the interest of building more quickly, the requirement for the height of the main span was lowered to 100 feet (30 m). Preparations to resume construction were made. Machinery was ordered, and new derricks were built, but a renewed threat of invasion again temporarily halted progress. Finally, in the spring of 1863, work commenced and continued until the end of the year.

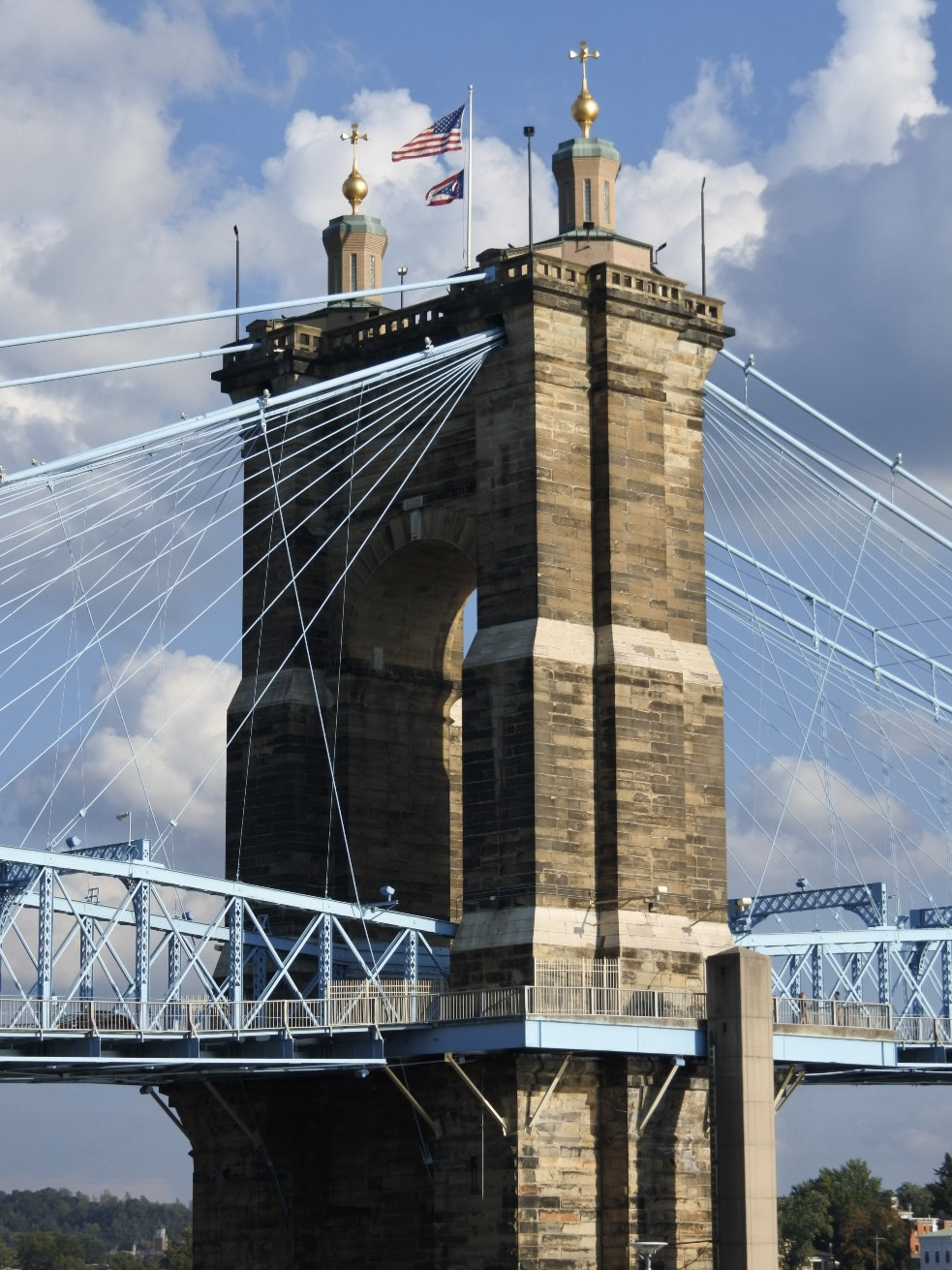
The tower of the bridge features two golden plated Greek Cross finials. The flag of the United States and flag of Ohio are displayed in the center.

In the spring of 1864, work resumed again. Although Roebling operated his own wire mill at Trenton, New Jersey, the bridge company purchased one million pounds of wire from Richard Johnson at Manchester, England, for the cables that would span the width of the river. Roebling had used Johnson's wire for one of his other bridges. He preferred it over wire made in the United States because it was of better quality and greater tensile strength. Anchorages on both shores were constructed of limestone base and a freestone finish. Eleven-ton iron anchors were embedded in each block, securing cables with wrought iron chain links of Roebling's patent. The Civil War depleted the work force on the project, hindering speed and efficiency until its end. Work on the bridge proceeded steadily after the end of the war. In September 1865 the first two wire ropes were laid. They were unwound from a spool on a barge, allowed to sink to the bottom of the river, then raised in unison from the riverbed. Wooden crossbeams were laid at regular intervals from the wire ropes, and a simple footbridge was constructed for the benefit of the workers. With the Ohio River "spanned," there was a final push to complete the project even through floods and freezing temperatures. The cabling of the bridge went at a feverish pace, with about eighty wires placed per day. Hundreds watched the spider-like process from both shores. And on June 23, 1866, the last wire was taken across, for a total of 10,360 wires. These were subsequently compressed together and wrapped with an outer covering of wire into two cables of 5,180 wires each. Suspenders were hung from the cables by the end of August, and 600,000 feet (180,000 m) of oak lumber was laid as the deck across 300 wrought iron suspended beams. Two tracks for streetcars were laid. Diagonal stays were added to increase load capacity, strengthen the floor, and check vibration. Wrought iron trusses were added, running the length of the bridge.

On December 1, 1866, pedestrians walked upon the bridge, known locally only as "The Suspension Bridge," for the first time. Over 166,000 people walked across in the first two days. Final touches were put on the bridge over the next few months, and construction officially ended in July 1867. Two men died during construction. When the Roebling Bridge was formally opened on January 1, 1867, the driver of a horse and buggy was charged a toll of 15 cents to cross; the toll for three horses and a carriage was 25 cents. Pedestrians were charged one cent.

== Use and operation ==
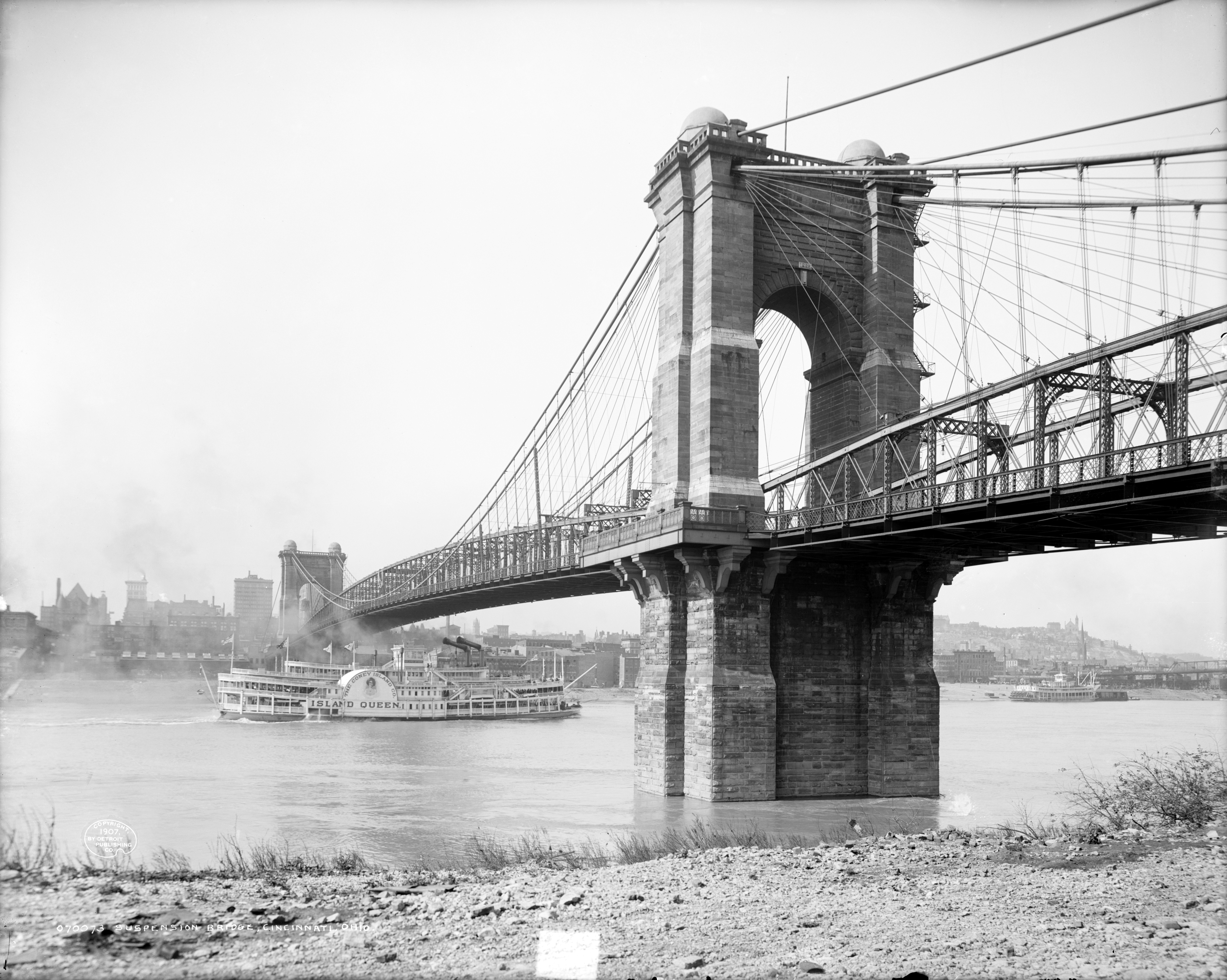
The Roebling Suspension Bridge in 1907

The bridge was repainted blue in 1894. The original deck of the bridge was built at the lowest possible cost because of Civil War inflation, but the stone towers had been designed to carry a much heavier load than was originally demanded. In 1896, the bridge received a second set of main cables, a wider steel deck, and a longer northern approach. The reconstruction significantly altered the appearance of the bridge, but the new 30-ton weight limit extended its usefulness through the 20th century and beyond.

In 1901, electric lighting was added to the bridge. In 1918, an extension of the approach was completed to Third Street.

Ramps were constructed leading directly from the bridge to the Dixie Terminal building used for streetcars in the late 1920s. These provided Covington–Cincinnati streetcars "with a grade-separated route to the center of downtown, and the terminal building was originally intended to connect, via underground pedestrian passages, with the never-built Fountain Square Station of the infamous Cincinnati Subway."

At the time the Suspension Bridge was built, the Ohio River was very shallow, often only a few feet deep. A 100-foot vertical clearance was important as steamboats had high stacks to keep sparks as far as possible from the rest of the wooden craft. As more railroads were built and barges replaced steamboat traffic, dams to raise the river and control flooding made sense. In the early 1900s Congress authorized a system of locks and dams along the Ohio River. In 1929, the canalization project produced 51 wooden wicket dams and lock chambers along its length. This system assured that the depth of river at Cincinnati never fell below 9 feet. During the 1940s, a shift from steam propelled to diesel powered towboats allowed for longer barges than could be accommodated by the existing dams. In the 1950s the US Army Corps of Engineers replaced the outdated system with new non-navigable dams made of concrete and steel. These dams raised the height of the river at Cincinnati to a normal pool of about 26 feet, lowering the clearance of the Roebling Suspension Bridge to around 74 feet.

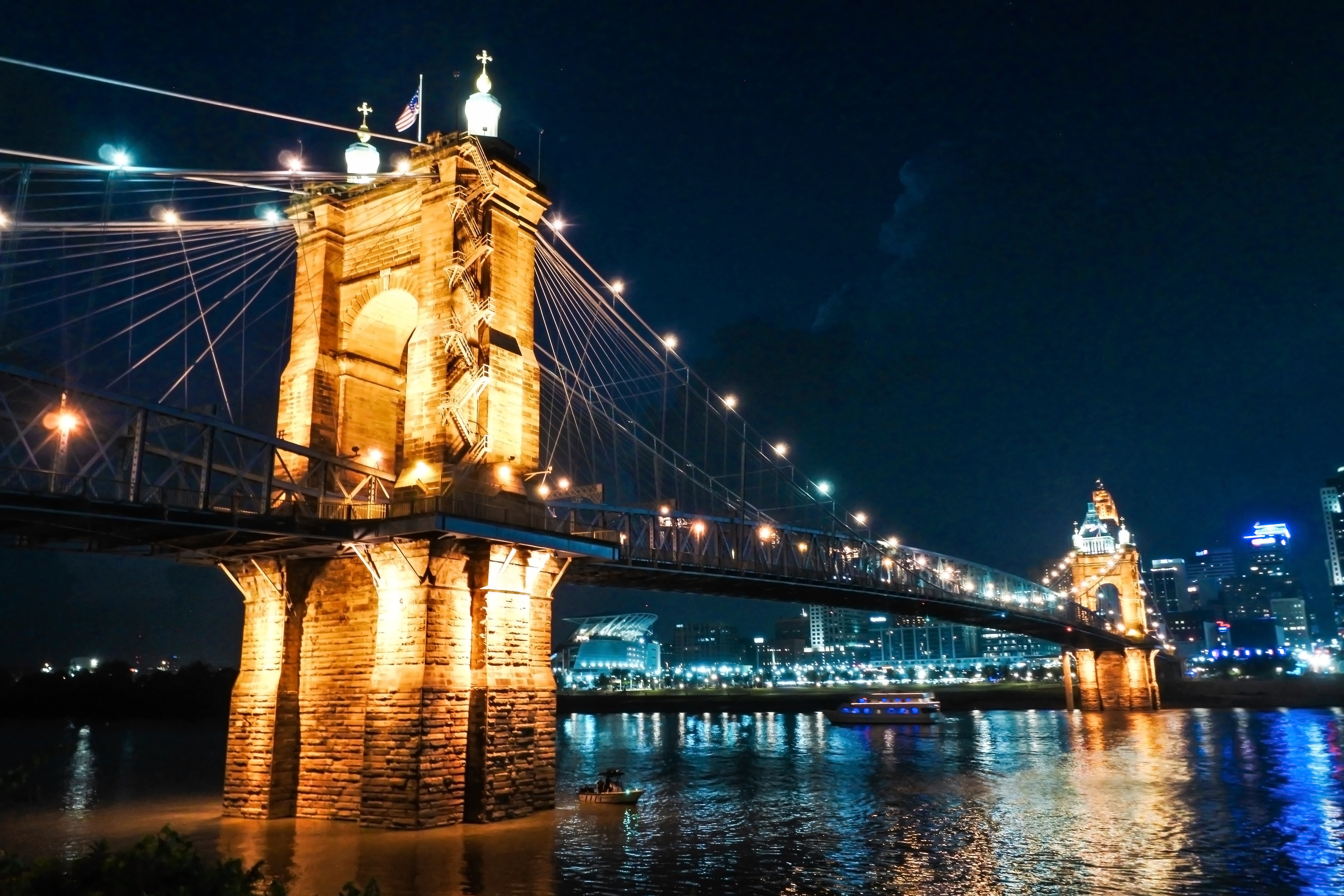
The Roebling Suspension Bridge at night

The Covington-Cincinnati Bridge Company—a private company—operated the bridge until the commonwealth of Kentucky purchased it in 1953 for $4.2 million. Soon after this, the bridge was redecked to have a steel deck instead of the previous wooden one. When streetcar service ceased in the 1950s, the ramps onto the Dixie terminal were rebuilt to be used by diesel buses.

The state collected tolls until 1963 when the Brent Spence Bridge was opened on Interstate 75, downstream, approximately 0.6 miles (0.97 km) to the west of The Roebling Suspension Bridge. In the fall of 1966, the bridge's 100th anniversary was celebrated with a parade at Court Street. In 1969, the bridge was renovated. The bridge was designated a National Historic Landmark in 1975, and in 1976, in honor of America's bicentennial, the bridge was painted light blue.

Initially called the "Covington-Cincinnati Suspension Bridge" or "Ohio River Bridge", it was renamed in honor of its designer and builder on June 27, 1983. It was designated a National Historic Civil Engineering Landmark the same year.

In 1984, at the cost of $200,000, the bridge had lighting installed on its cables. They also later restored its sprails at the cost of 10 million. In 1996, the bridge was renovated. The ramps onto the Dixie Terminal were demolished in 1998 when it ceased being used as a bus terminal.

View from Cincinnati toward Covington, 2023

The commonwealth of Kentucky closed the bridge on November 13, 2006, to make extensive repairs to the structure. It reopened in late March. However, it closed again for much of 2008 for repainting. On September 11, 2007, Kentucky reduced the weight limit to 11 tons to prevent future structural damage following an analysis by the University of Kentucky. The lower weight limit prevents buses from crossing the bridge.

Kentucky once again closed the bridge on April 7, 2010, for repainting; the bridge reopened in November 2010. The closing of the bridge only affected vehicular traffic, while one pedestrian lane remained open. On January 10, 2013, a large piece of sandstone fell from the north tower causing the bridge to be closed for approximately 4 hours during rush hour. This time was used to remove debris and inspect the tower for further damage.

On March 21, 2018, the bridge was closed until April 27 after an automobile accident damaged a steel section of the bridge. On April 17, 2019, another piece of sandstone fell, prompting closure until August 9.

On November 11, 2020, the nearby Brent Spence Bridge was closed following a fiery collision. Semitrucks began using the Roebling Bridge as an alternate crossing point, in violation of the bridge's 11-ton weight limit, prompting Covington police to close the suspension bridge to all vehicular traffic so additional safeguards could be put in place. The Roebling Bridge reopened on November 13, 2020, with Covington and Cincinnati police monitoring traffic on the bridge.

On February 15, 2021, the bridge closed for a nine-month rehabilitation project; it reopened in November 2021.

== See also ==
- List of bridges documented by the Historic American Engineering Record in Kentucky
- List of bridges documented by the Historic American Engineering Record in Ohio
- List of crossings of the Ohio River
- List of historic civil engineering landmarks
- List of largest suspension bridges
- List of National Historic Landmarks in Kentucky
- List of National Historic Landmarks in Ohio
