= Florence station (River Line) =

Florence
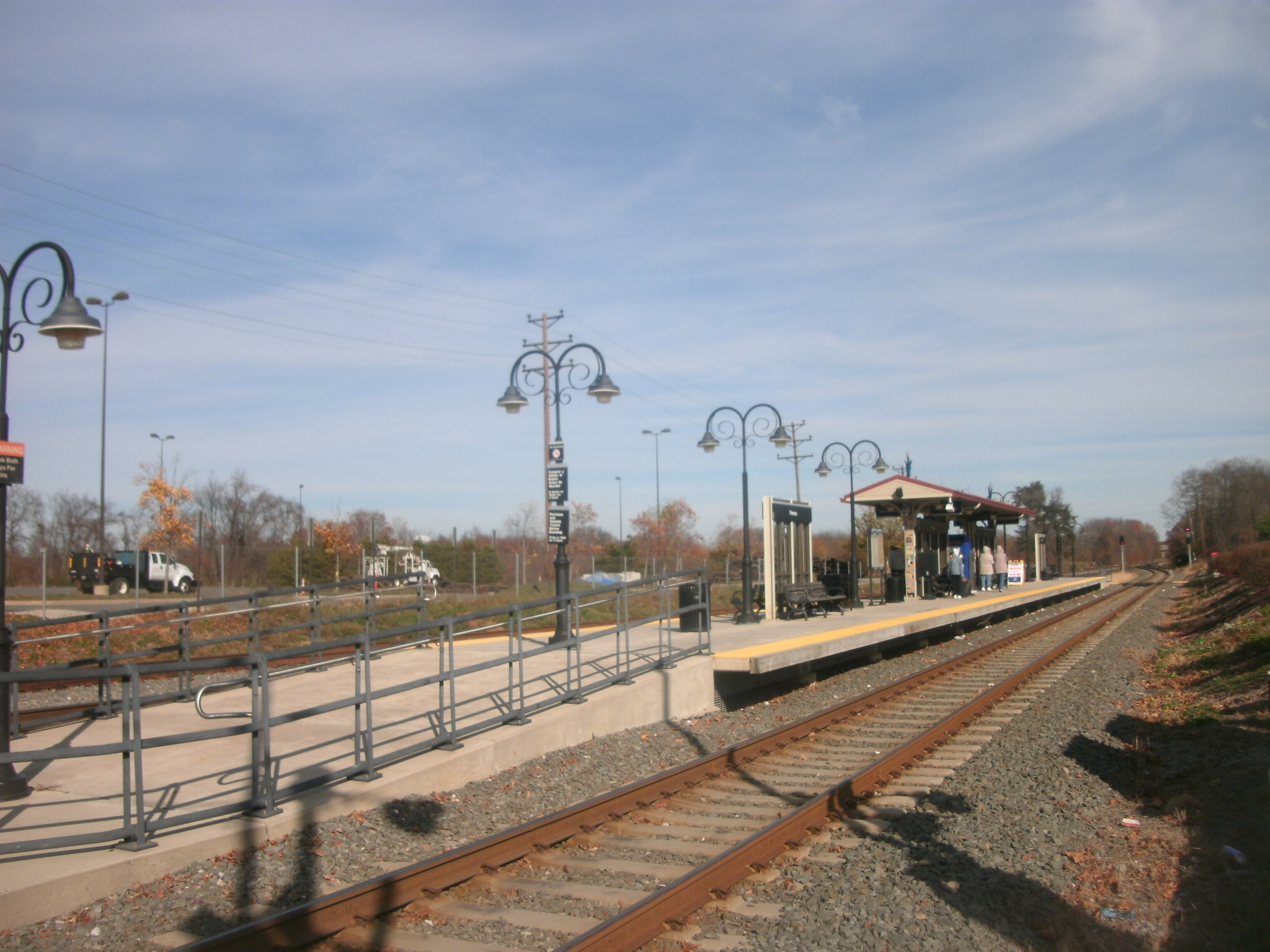
- The station at Florence as seen in November 2011 from the southern end on the platform.

General information
- Location: 2021 U.S. Route 130; Florence, New Jersey
- Coordinates: 40°6′0″N 74°48′18″W
- Owner: New Jersey Transit
- Platforms: 1 island platform
- Tracks: 3
- Connections: NJ Transit Bus: 409, 413; BurLINK: B5

Construction
- Parking: 589 spaces, 14 accessible spaces
- Accessible: Yes

Other information
- Fare zone: 1

History
- Opened: March 15, 2004

Services
Preceding station	NJ Transit	Following station
Burlington Towne Centre toward Entertainment Center	River Line	Roebling toward Trenton

Former services
Preceding station	Pennsylvania Railroad	Following station
East Burlington toward Camden	Amboy Branch	Roebling toward South Amboy
Location

Florence station is a station on the River Line light rail system, located on John Galt Way off of U.S. Route 130 in Florence Township in Burlington County, New Jersey, United States, although it is addressed as being on Route 130.

== History ==
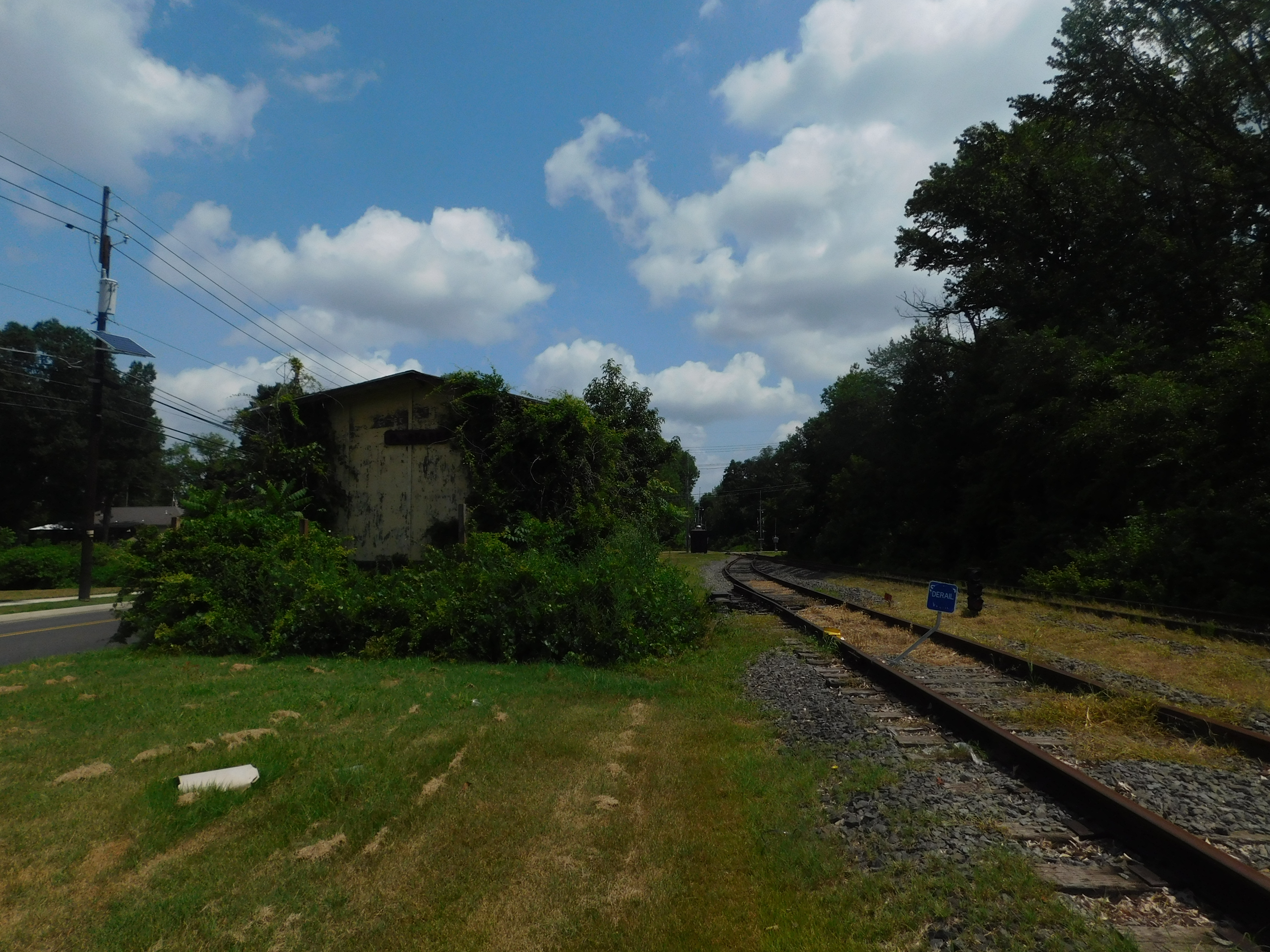
The former Pennsylvania Railroad station at Florence in August 2025

The Pennsylvania Railroad's Florence station lay approximately 1.23 miles (1.98 km) to the east of the current station site, on Delaware Avenue. Service between Trenton and Camden ended on June 28, 1963.

The station opened on March 15, 2004. Southbound service from the station is available to Camden, New Jersey. Northbound service is available to the Trenton Rail Station with connections to New Jersey Transit trains to New York City, SEPTA trains to Philadelphia, Pennsylvania, and Amtrak trains. Transfer to the PATCO Speedline is available at the Walter Rand Transportation Center.

Park and ride service is available at this station, which uses only two of the three tracks at the station.
