= Roebling station =

Train station in Roebling, New Jersey

Roebling
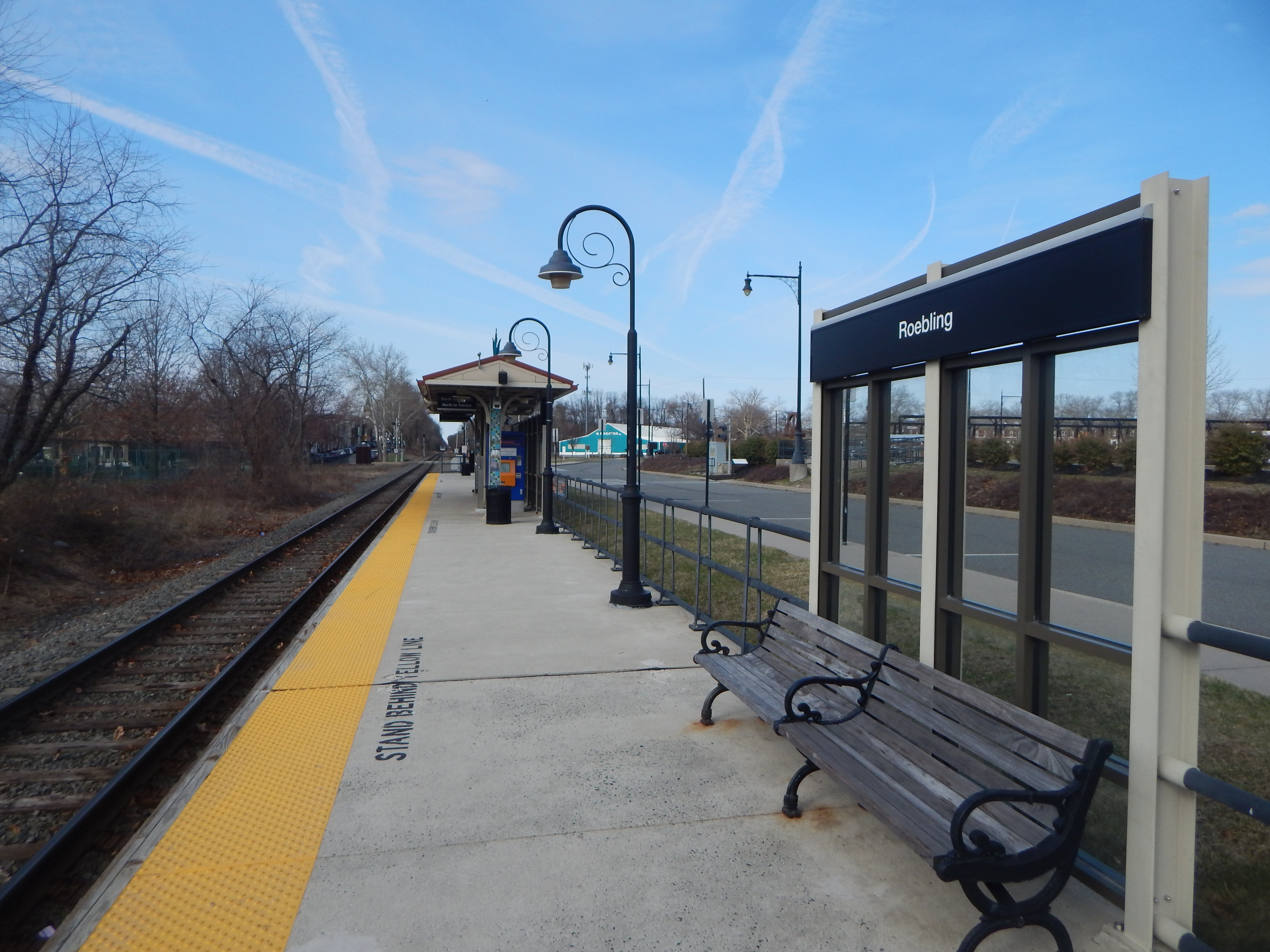
- Platform at Roebling station in April 2015, facing southwest

General information
- Location: 1499 Hornberger Avenue; Roebling, New Jersey
- Coordinates: 40°7′1″N 74°46′13″W
- Owner: New Jersey Transit
- Platforms: 1 side platform
- Tracks: 1
- Connections: NJ Transit Bus: 409

Construction
- Parking: 215 spaces, 10 accessible spaces
- Accessible: yes

Other information
- Fare zone: 1

History
- Opened: c. 1907 (PRR station); March 15, 2004 (River Line station)
- Closed: 1950s (PRR station)

Services
Preceding station	NJ Transit	Following station
Florence toward Entertainment Center	River Line	Bordentown toward Trenton

Former services
Preceding station	Pennsylvania Railroad	Following station
Florence toward Camden	Amboy Branch	Kinkora toward South Amboy
Location

Roebling station is a station on the River Line light rail system, located in Roebling, New Jersey. The station opened on March 15, 2004 together with the line. A previous station, operated by the Pennsylvania Railroad, was located at the site from around 1907 until the 1950s. The station consists of one side platform serving the single-track line; an adjacent parking lot originally intended to support nearby developments is used by local commuters.

== History ==
=== PRR station ===
The Camden and Amboy Railroad opened through what is now Roebling in 1834; there was no stop at the modern site, which was then undeveloped, nor at Kinkora just to the east, where the Kinkora Branch met the main line. The Roebling Steel Mill complex was built in 1904–1905 along the line, which was then the Pennsylvania Railroad's Amboy Division.

The PRR opened a Knickerbocker Row station in Roebling about three years after the factory; it was soon renamed to Roebling in May 1907. It was located at the corner of Hornberger Avenue and Railroad Avenue across the tracks from the modern station site and served a "large business" of passenger and freight traffic. By 1915 the station saw seventeen daily passenger trains and seven daily mail trains; half-hourly service was available on a trolley line which ran slightly to the west, crossing the railroad at Roland Street. One of the most important buildings in Roebling, it was used as a wayfinding landmark.

Like most stations on the line, the Roebling station was a small wooden structure with a gabled roof. A separate small wooden platform was in place for boarding trains. Like many lines, the Amboy division lost passenger traffic to cars and freight traffic to trucks. The last passenger service to Roebling was in the 1950s; passenger service on the line ended in 1963. The mill closed in 1974, and the station was demolished around the same time.

=== River Line station ===
In the 1990s, New Jersey Transit began planning a diesel light rail line, the Southern New Jersey Light Rail Transit System (SNJLRTS). After alternative routes were discarded, it was determined that it would run along the original Camden and Amboy line, by then owned by Conrail as the Bordentown Secondary. Two stations were planned to serve Florence Township: Florence park and ride station, and a Roebling station with fewer parking spaces, intended to serve local riders and support transit-oriented development at the former mill site. The station is walkable from the dense Roebling-built rowhouses near by, as well as much of Florence proper; the area was considered to be supportive of transit use, with 550 daily boardings projected by 2020.

After several years of construction, the River Line including Roebling station opened on March 15, 2004. In September 2004, additional early morning service from Florence and Roebling to Trenton was introduced to serve riders from Florence Township bound to Newark and New York who transfer to Northeast Corridor Line services at Trenton.

The planned redevelopment of the mill site has been slower than originally expected by local officials; by late 2014, only preliminary work to widen Hornberger Avenue and streamline the permitting process had begun. This has limited the utilization of the station: the 215-space parking lot was designed for expansion to 500 spaces, but by 2010 average weekday usage was 26.5% (57 spaces) – one of the lowest usage rates on the NJT system.
