= Daniel Melnick =

American film producer (1932–2009)

- Born: April 21, 1932; New York City, U.S.
- Died: October 13, 2009 (aged 77); Los Angeles, California, U.S.
- Occupations: Film producer; studio executive
- Notable work: All That Jazz; Straw Dogs
- Spouse: Linda (1955–1971)
- Children: 2; Including Peter Rodgers Melnick

Daniel Melnick (April 21, 1932 – October 13, 2009) was an American film producer. He began his career in Hollywood as a teenager in television and later became the producer of such films as All That Jazz, Altered States and Straw Dogs. Melnick's films won more than 20 Academy Awards out of some 80 nominations.

== Early life and education ==
Daniel Melnick was born on April 21, 1932, in New York City, the son of Celia and Benjamin Melnick, Jewish immigrants from Ukraine. His father died in a car crash when Melnick was a child. His mother later remarried. Melnick attended the High School of Performing Arts in Manhattan. After high school, Melnick attended New York University. During the 1950s, Melnick served in the United States Army where he produced entertainment for troops while stationed at New Jersey's Fort Dix and Fort Sill in Oklahoma.

== Television, film and theater ==
After relocating to Hollywood as a 19-year-old, he became CBS Television's youngest producer, and then shortly thereafter was hired by ABC, where he worked on the development of such programs as The Flintstones and The Fugitive.

=== Talent Associates ===
After a stint in the army, Melnick returned to New York City in the late '50s, becoming a partner in Talent Associates, a production company founded several years earlier by David Susskind and Leonard Stern. Among other productions, TA created the Emmy Award winning secret agent satire Get Smart that ran from 1965 to 1970 on CBS and NBC, as well as the police drama N.Y.P.D. that ran on the American Broadcasting Company (ABC) from 1967 to 1969. Melnick's role in Get Smart was to hire Mel Brooks and Buck Henry to create a half hour sitcom addressing in Melnick's words "the two biggest things in the entertainment world today – James Bond and Inspector Clouseau". ABC paid for a pilot episode, but did not purchase the series, so Melnick turned to Grant Tinker at NBC, who had Don Adams under contract and were looking for a project for the comedian.

Talent Associates produced the Emmy Award-winning TV productions aired on CBS, with Ages of Man starring John Gielgud in 1966, which included readings from William Shakespeare's works ranging from Romeo and Juliet to Richard II, with critic Jack Gould of The New York Times calling it "a viewing occasion to be treasured". In 1967 they presented Arthur Miller's Death of a Salesman, starring Lee J. Cobb, a production that Jack Gould of The Times described as one "that will stand as the supreme understanding of the tragedy of Willy Loman." The firm, Talent Associates, was bought out by Norton Simon, Inc. in August 1968 for an undisclosed price, with the commitment that the unit would operate independently and the principals would stay on in senior positions to manage the company.

Together with Joseph E. Levine of Embassy Pictures, Susskind and Melnick produced the Broadway theatre musical comedy Kelly, by Eddie Lawrence and Mark Charlap. Promotion for the play included an event on the Brooklyn Bridge with a series of chorus girls. The play, a story about the 1886 incident of Steve Brodie who (claimed to have) jumped off the Brooklyn Bridge and survived, opened on February 16, 1965. The play lasted only one performance on Broadway, which was later described by Melnick's son as "not his favorite moment in history", but nonetheless one he wore with grace.

The 1971 psychological thriller Straw Dogs was his first feature film.

=== Head of MGM ===
In February 1972, Melnick was hired by Metro-Goldwyn-Mayer as head of production. At that time, MGM was in a financial decline with the studio scaling back production but while head of the studio, he produced several well-received films including the 1975 Neil Simon comedy The Sunshine Boys (1975) and Paddy Chayefsky's Network, directed by Sidney Lumet, a biting satire of television production that was credited with boosting the studio's financial performance during 1976. Melnick also mined the studio's extensive archives to create the successful series of That's Entertainment! compilation films showcasing classic movies from MGMs heydey as Hollywood's most prestigious film studio. In 1976, he left MGM to start IndieProductions (later known as The IndieProd Company) at Columbia Pictures.

=== Columbia ===
He was hired by Columbia Pictures as its president in June 1978 to replace David Begelman, who had resigned in the wake of an embezzlement scandal. There he oversaw the development of the 1978 picture Midnight Express and the 1979 films Kramer vs. Kramer and The China Syndrome.

In 1980, he moved to 20th Century Fox where he completed Bob Fosse's All That Jazz, with Fox paying for filming that Columbia would not finance. That same year he produced Altered States with Warner Brothers, an adaptation of a Chayefsky novel that Columbia was unwilling to fund. Shortly after that, he resurrected The IndieProd Company to set up his own projects after his mismanagement at Columbia, that given a right of first refusal to produce projects.

=== Later years ===
Melnick's later films included the 1987 Steve Martin comedy Roxanne, an adaption of the classic play Cyrano de Bergerac, Mountains of the Moon in 1990, the 1991 Steve Martin comedy L.A. Story, and the action comedy Blue Streak (1999), which was his final film credit. Through The IndieProd Company, Carolco Pictures acquired the company in 1987. In 1989, the company set up a joint partnership with Rastar Productions to start a joint venture Rastar/IndieProd at Carolco Pictures, headed by Nancy Tanen and Tracy Barone, both of them would eventually join Channel Productions briefly in 1993. In 1992, Carolco sold off IndieProd, becoming an independent production company once again, and received a four-year $350 million distribution pact with TriStar Pictures and Japan Satellite Broadcasting in order to invest money into their own films.

== Personal life ==
In February 1955, Melnick married Linda Rodgers, the daughter of Richard Rodgers and Dorothy Feiner Rodgers, at her parents' home in Manhattan. Their son, Peter Rodgers Melnick, became a composer. After he and Linda Rodgers divorced in 1971, Melnick fathered a daughter.

Melnick was known for personal elegance and refined tastes in art, dress, and architecture. A thinker, he often offered sage advice, once telling a young assistant that "the best contracts are written not in the thrall of a new marriage but with the possibility of a divorce in mind."

He once said to the same assistant that, when facing a business dilemma, he would sometimes ask himself what the 17th-century French statesman Cardinal Richelieu, whose genius for intrigue he admired, might do in a similar situation.

During Melnick's days on the 20th Century-Fox lot, some of his staffers would affectionately refer to him (albeit privately) as Mel Nick. The inspiration for the name arose when deliverymen arrived in front of the unmarked Indieprod building with a wardrobe box of clothes from Ralph Lauren – on which someone had scrawled in large letters MEL and below it NICK. Not knowing who he was or where to find him, one shouted, "We're looking for a Mel Nick! There a Mel Nick around here?"

In regard to producing films, Melnick once reminded one of his assistants, who he thought was working too hard, that "this business is supposed to be fun."

His regular poker games would include such Hollywood notables as Johnny Carson, Chevy Chase, Barry Diller, Steve Martin, Carl Reiner and Neil Simon.

Melnick died at the age of 77 on October 13, 2009, at his home in Los Angeles of lung cancer. He was survived by a son, a daughter, and two grandchildren.

== Select credits ==
He was a producer in all films unless otherwise noted.

=== Film ===
Year	Film	Credit	Notes	Other notes
1971	Straw Dogs			
1979	All That Jazz	Executive producer		
1980	First Family			
1980	Altered States	Executive producer		
1982	Making Love			
1984	Unfaithfully Yours	Executive producer		
1984	Footloose	Executive producer		
1986	Quicksilver			
1987	Roxanne			
1988	Punchline			
1990	Mountains of the Moon			
1990	Air America			
1991	L.A. Story			
1999	Universal Soldier: The Return	Executive producer		
1999	Blue Streak	Executive producer		
2004	Air America: Operation Jaguar	Executive producer	Direct-to-video	Final film as a producer

As Head of MGM

Year	Film
1972	They Only Kill Their Masters
1973	The Man Who Loved Cat Dancing
1973	Westworld
1975	The Sunshine Boys
1976	Network

Thanks

Year	Film	Role
1998	Smoke Signals	Thanks

=== Television ===
Year	Title	Credit	Notes
1953	The Bob Crosby Show	Associate producer	
1963	The DuPont Show of the Week	Executive producer	
1963−64	Hootenanny	Executive producer	
1964	East Side/West Side	Executive producer	
1964	Mr. Broadway	Executive producer	
1966	Ages of Man		Television film
1966	Death of a Salesman		Television film
1966	ABC Stage 67		
1966	Run, Buddy, Run	Executive producer	
1967	Good Company	Executive producer	
1967	The Desperate Hours		Television film
1967−68	He & She		
1968	Penelope Beware!		Television film
1967−69	N.Y.P.D.	Executive producer	
1968−69	The Generation Gap	Executive producer	
1989	Get Smart, Again!	Executive producer	Television film

Thanks

Year	Title	Role
2004	American Masters	Thanks
2013	Special Collector's Edition	In memory of
