= Kelly (musical) =

- Boston Playbill
- Music: Moose Charlap
- Lyrics: Eddie Lawrence
- Book: Eddie Lawrence
- Basis: Steve Brodie
- Productions: 1965 Broadway

Kelly is a musical with a book and lyrics by Eddie Lawrence and music by Moose Charlap. It was inspired by Steve Brodie, who in 1886 claimed to have jumped off the Brooklyn Bridge and survived. The story centers around Hop Kelly, a daredevil busboy. Some Bowery gamblers try to prevent him from surviving a jump from the Brooklyn Bridge.

The 1965 musical is notable for having closed after its opening night performance on Broadway, becoming one of the biggest flops in Broadway history.

== Background ==
Inspired by the 1880s tale of Brooklyn Bridge-jumper Steve Brodie, the musical features period characters Diamond Jim Brady, Frank and Jesse James, Tony Pastor, Lillian Russell and John L. Sullivan.

Of the show's origins, Eddie Lawrence, lyricist and librettist, recalled that: "Moose Charlap had finished doing his songs for Peter Pan, starring Mary Martin, and a couple of one-acts of mine were being performed while I toured late night TV plugging my comedy album. During the afternoons, we worked on Kelly. It was a labour of love". At that early stage, the show was titled Never Go There Anymore.

== Production ==
Lawrence further recalls that "we ran into some producers who said they'd been waiting for this show all their lives and wanted to present it on Broadway". The show's original producer was Broadway stalwart Edward Padula (in association with January Productions), whose deal included a motion picture adaptation. Toward the end of 1963, it was reported that the budget had been set at $350,000, with $100,000 to be invested by Roulette Records. At this early stage, a number of actors were named as possible leads. Impressionist Frank Gorshin and film actor Richard Harris were both considered for the lead male role, while Moose Charlap's wife, pop singer Sandy Stewart, was considered for the lead female role. Lindsey Anderson was engaged as the show's director. Rehearsals were scheduled to start on 27 January 1964, with a Broadway opening planned for March. None of this, however, came to pass.

By April of that year, the show had been taken up by new producers, David Susskind, Daniel Melnick, and Joseph E. Levine of Embassy Pictures. Levine financed $250,000 of the $400,000 budget, with the balance coming from Columbia Records and six other investors. The sponsors acquired the motion picture rights by placing a down payment of $500, with the ultimate cost rising to a maximum of $650,000 based on a percentage of ticket sales for each of the show's profitable weeks.

=== Previews and Broadway opening ===
Before its Broadway opening, the show was presented for three weeks in Philadelphia and half a week in Boston. While Kelly was in tryouts, roles played by Ella Logan, Jack Creley, and Avery Schreiber were cut by show doctors Leonard Stern and Mel Brooks. Pre-Broadway promotion for the show included an event on the Brooklyn Bridge with a series of chorus girls.

Directed and choreographed by Herbert Ross, the musical began previews at the Broadhurst Theatre on February 1, 1965 and opened (and closed) on February 6 after seven previews and one performance. The cast included Wilfrid Brambell, Don Francks, Anita Gillette, Mickey Shaughnessy, Eileen Rodgers, and Jesse White. Scenic design was by Oliver Smith, costume design by Freddy Wittop, and lighting design by Tharon Musser. The show's logo, which featured on posters and playbills (and, much later, on the LP and CD covers) was designed by French-born illustrator Tomi Ungerer, who was then (and remains) best known for his children's picture books.

== Critical reception and legal fallout ==
Industry representatives quoted in The New York Times stated they "could not recall any other Broadway musical representing such a comparable expenditure that became a casualty so quickly". Costs had ballooned to $650,000, with the biggest loser being Levine, followed by Melnick and Susskind, who had invested a total of $150,000. There had been increasing arguments between the producers and writers, with Susskind complaining that the authors were unwilling to make changes per the recommendations of the investors. Charlap and Lawrence were so upset with changes that they filed suit in New York Supreme Court seeking an injunction to prevent the play from opening. While the judge urged that the parties pursue arbitration, lawyers representing Charlap and Lawrence were threatening to sue for damages that had been caused through "unauthorized changes, omissions and additions" made to the musical.

In his review in The New York Times, critic Howard Taubman opened by noting that "Ella Logan was written out of Kelly before it reached the Broadhurst Theater Saturday night. Congratulations, Miss Logan", and continued to describe what he saw as a production for which there were "ample critical, if not legal, grounds for an injunction", lampooning the legal wrangling that had gone on about the production. The play's brief life was later described by Melnick's son as "not his [father's] favorite moment in history", but nonetheless one he wore with grace.

Later that year, there were reports of an Off-Broadway revival of the show, to be produced by David Rubinson of Columbia Records. This was intended to present the show in its original form, as conceived by Lawrence and Charlap, as opposed to the much-revised and re-written version that finally opened on Broadway.

== Synopsis ==
In turn of the century 1880s New York an Irish immigrant, teenage busboy named Hop Kelly is a sentimental daredevil who wants to make a successful jump from the Brooklyn Bridge and become a hero. He has chickened out of three attempts already. A group of Bowery gamblers are betting against him surviving the jump, and they don't like the suspense. They decide to throw a dummy off the bridge in his place, but Hop really wants to make the jump, and eventually he successfully does so.

== Original recordings ==
Although Columbia Records were one of the show's original backers, no cast album was ever commercially recorded. As was typical at the time, a demonstration recording of the show's score was recorded by its composer and lyricist/librettist at an early stage in its inception. Produced by Frank Military in 1964, the recording was performed by Charlap and Lawrence themselves, and included thirteen songs from the score. Because the show subsequently underwent considerable revision, this demo recording included several songs that were eventually cut from the show, or otherwise went unused in the produced version.

The demo recording, which was only ever intended as a limited edition for private circulation amongst potential backers and so on, was finally commercially released in 1980, fifteen years after the show had closed. The LP, simply entitled Eddie Lawrence and Moose Charlap sing their songs from the Musical Kelly formed part of a series of albums on the Original Cast label, founded in 1975 by Bruce Yeko and Doris Chu Yeko, which specialised in obscure musical theatre recordings. The album's executive producers were the Yekos and Eddie Lawrence. It was dedicated to the memory of Moose Charlap, who died in 1974.

Moose Charlap's wife, Sandy Stewart, who was a cabaret and jazz vocalist, released her own pop version of the song "Never Go There Anymore" in 1965, with a lush arrangement by Don Costa. The song subsequently became a standard. In 2000, it was described by Stephen Sondheim as one of the songs that he wishes that he'd written, at least in part.

Before the Broadway premiere, Fran Jeffries recorded in 1964 the song "Ballad to a Brute (You're the Man That I Want)" included in her album Fran Jeffries Sings of Sex and The Single Girl (1964, MGM Records, SE-4268).

== Concert recording ==
In 1998, the York Theatre Company in New York City presented a concert version of Kelly as part of its "musicals in mufti" series spotlighting neglected Broadway scores. Performers included Brian D'Arcy James, Jane Connell, George S. Irving, John Schuck, Marcia Lewis, and Sandy Stewart, who was in the original production. Interest in the concert among theatre buffs resulted in sold-out performances and a cast recording.

The concert recording was released by Original Cast records, the same label that had released the demo recording in 1980. Eddie Lawrence was credited as artistic director, and Sandy Stewart as musical advisor. This recording, which reflected the original score before all the revisions took place on the road, included a number of songs were later cut from the show or had not otherwise been used in the Broadway production. It also included, as a bonus track, Sandy Stewart's 1965 pop version of the song "Never Go There Anymore".

== Musical numbers ==
Act I

- "Ode to the Bridge" – Hop Kelly
- "Six Blocks from the Bridge" – Stickpin Sidney Crane, Jack Mulligan, Augie Masters and Company
- "That Old Time Crowd" – Fay Cherry and the Boys
- "Simple Ain't Easy" – Hop and Fay
- "I'm Gonna Walk Right Up to Her" – Hop and Mulligan
- "A Moment Ago" – Angela Crane and Hop
- "This Is a Tough Neighborhood" – Entire Company
- "Never Go There Anymore" – Angela and Hop

Act II

- "Life Can Be Beautiful" – Fay, Dan Kelly and Bums
- "Everyone Here Loves Kelly" – Fay and Company
- "Ballad to a Brute" – Angela and Hop
- "Heavyweight Champ of the World" – Mulligan and Company
- "Me and the Elements" – Hop and Dan
- "Everyone Here Loves Kelly (Reprise)" – Fay and Company
- "Never Go There Anymore (Reprise)" – Angela
- "Everyone Here Loves Kelly (Reprise)" – Entire Company
