= Bowery Bugs =

- Lobby card
- Directed by: Arthur Davis
- Story by: Lloyd Turner; William Scott (erroneous credit)
- Starring: Mel Blanc; Billy Bletcher (uncredited)
- Music by: Carl Stalling
- Animation by: Emery Hawkins; J.C. Melendez; Basil Davidovich; Don Williams
- Layouts by: Don Smith
- Backgrounds by: Philip DeGuard
- Color process: Technicolor
- Production company: Warner Bros. Cartoons
- Distributed by: Warner Bros. Pictures; The Vitaphone Corporation
- Release date: June 4, 1949
- Running time: 7:30
- Language: English

Bowery Bugs is a 1949 Warner Bros. Merrie Melodies cartoon directed by Arthur Davis, and written by Lloyd Turner and Bill Scott. It was released on June 4, 1949, and features Bugs Bunny. The cartoon tells the story of Steve Brodie, who reportedly jumped off the Brooklyn Bridge in 1886 and survived.

== Plot ==
Bugs Bunny is standing at the base of the famous Brooklyn Bridge, (about half a mile from the southern end of the actual street called the Bowery), telling an old man a story, in carnival-barker style, about how and why Steve Brody jumped off the bridge in July 1886 in the form of pictures: Brody had a terrific run of luck...all bad. He decided he needed a good luck charm...ideally, a rabbit's foot. But he could not find one in the city, so he tried looking in the country forest.

At this point, the story is animated. Brody cycles to Flatbush and finds Bugs' house. Brody, holding a knife, pulls Bugs (singing "All that glitters is not gold") out of his home and tells him that he needs a good luck charm and that "he is it". However, Bugs explains why rabbits feet are NOT all that lucky and directs Brody to "Swami Rabbitima". Brody decides to chance it on the condition he will come back for Bugs if it does not work.

The Swami (Bugs in disguise) asks Brody to enter. Just as Brody starts explaining his bad luck, he has his palm "read" (painted red) then Bugs starts reading the bumps on his head after hitting Brody over the head with a hammer several times. Brody angrily starts chasing Bugs who quickly deals out playing cards for cartomancy. He tells Brody that he has a meeting coming up with a man wearing a carnation (also Bugs in disguise), who will be his lucky mascot at gambling; Brody's luck does not change, though. Bugs' craps shot of 7 suddenly turns up snake-eyes, then Brody plays a slot machine that comes up with three lemons that literally roll out of the machine and into his hat. Furious, Brody tries to attack Bugs and is promptly kicked out of the gambling establishment by a gorilla bouncer.

Brody goes back to the Swami who realizes that the cartomancy failed. For his second attempt, Bugs spins a zodiac wheel which lands on the sign of the wolf. He tells Brody that it means he is lucky with love, but his flirting with a "lady" (also Bugs in disguise) only results in a multiple bonking by a policeman for being a "masher".

Brody returns to the Swami and is about to pulverize him when he is asked precisely WHY he wants his luck to change. Taking Brody's answer literally ("So I can get me hands on some dough!"), Bugs sends him to 29 River Street, home of "Grandma's Happy Home Bakery". When Brody arrives there and demands the "dough" at gunpoint, a baker (Bugs yet again) gladly obliges with "a mess of dough" which Brody gets stuck in and is baked into a pie.

Unmasking the baker as Bugs, Brody retraces his steps to unmask Bugs' previous disguises, leading Brody to believe that "everybody's a rabbit!". When Brody looks into what he thinks is a mirror (but is actually a window) and sees Bugs looking back at him, he thinks HE has turned into a rabbit and snaps, hopping down the street and turning onto the Brooklyn Bridge, hysterically shouting "What's up, doc?!"

Seeing a police officer staring contemplatively at the East River from the middle of the bridge, Brody comes up behind him and begs for help. Turning, the officer reveals himself to be Bugs, demanding (in a thick Irish accent) "What's all this about rabbits, Doc?". That being the last straw, Brody leaps off the bridge, apparently as suicide. The scene freezes with Brody in mid-air to a poster seen behind Bugs who apparently rushed out to save him off-screen.

Bugs ends the story there, and the impressed old man says: "That's enough, son! I'll buy it!" and hands Bugs some money. This was a reference to George C. Parker, a con artist who would often "sell" the Brooklyn Bridge to people, thus originating the phrase "Have I got a bridge to sell ya!"

== Historical background ==
Steve Brodie (note actual spelling) was a native of the Lower East Side. He first came to the attention of the local press as a teenager in 1879, when he was reportedly an influential figure among fellow newsboys and bootblackers. By 1886, he was a professional gambler who had fallen unto debt. In 1885, daredevil Robert Emmet Odlum jumped off the Brooklyn Bridge, and was killed doing so. Brodie took a dare to successfully jump off the Bridge.

On the morning of July 23, 1886, Brodie took position on the railings of the bridge. Meanwhile, his friends boarded a rowboat to test the waters below. The jump was originally set for 10:00 am, but was called off because of a strong tide. Brodie returned c. 2:00 pm and reportedly rode in the back of a wagon until jumping off. He reportedly first took off his hat and shoes, and then fell from a height of c. 100 yards. There were accounts by eyewitnesses and extensive news reports, but his jump is still in doubt. The prevailing theory among historians is that a life-size dummy fell in his place.

Brodie capitalized on his reputation as a vaudeville performer. He died in 1901, possibly from diabetes. His reputation survived him and inspired the film The Bowery (1933). The subsequent cartoon short cast Bugs as the motivator behind the famous jump.

== Production notes ==
The short stars Bugs Bunny (voiced by Mel Blanc, who also voices the other men in the pool hall) and Steve Brody (voiced here by Billy Bletcher), who was based on the real-life Brooklyn bookmaker Steve Brodie who claimed to have jumped off the Brooklyn Bridge.

This is the first and only Bugs Bunny cartoons directed by Arthur Davis (not counting Bugs' cameo in The Goofy Gophers).

Although Bill Scott (of Bullwinkle J. Moose fame) is credited as a co-writer, he told Keith Scott in the book The Moose That Roared that he had no recollection of working on this film. By all indications, Lloyd Turner alone was responsible for the film's story, with Scott having been moved to a brief, unsuccessful spell as Friz Freleng's story artist, though the reason why Scott was still credited on this short is not known.

== Home media ==
Bowery Bugs is available on Looney Tunes Golden Collection: Volume 3 and on Looney Tunes Collector's Vault: Volume 2.

== See also ==
- Bugs Bunny filmography
- Looney Tunes and Merrie Melodies filmography (1940–1949)

== Sources ==
- Ferrara, Eric (2011), "114 Bowery", The Bowery: A History of Grit, Graft and Grandeur, The History Press, ISBN 9781614230045, archived from the original on March 10, 2016

Preceded by High Diving Hare	Bugs Bunny Cartoons; 1949	Succeeded by Long-Haired Hare
