= Camilla Kenyon =

American novelist

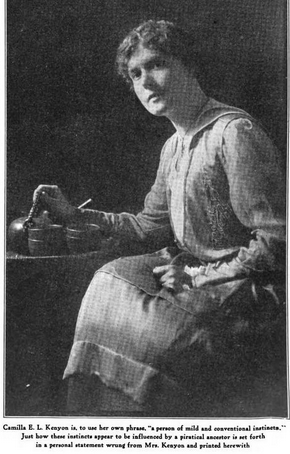
Camilla E. L. Kenyon, from a 1918 publication.

Camilla E. L. Kenyon (May 15, 1876 – September 25, 1957) was an American author of two novels and several short works. Her first novel was Spanish Doubloons, originally published in 1919 by Bobbs Merrill, also serialized in Munsey's Magazine and republished in a less-costly hardback edition by the A. L. Burt Company. It is a story about a group of treasure hunters on a Pacific island, told from the first person viewpoint of the heroine. It is widely available today as a free e-book from numerous sites, and it has also been reprinted in a paperback edition.

== Career ==
Among her reviews for Spanish Doubloons was Publishers Weekly in 1920, which said "..."From the first page the reader never doubts that all will be well at the last page and is therefore able to enjoy terrible predicaments and deadly perils that beset this latest of treasure seekers...". Her second novel was Fortune At Bandy's Flat, published by Bobbs Merrill in 1921. The Sketch also said of the book "Spanish Doubloons has the full thrill of its name and something extra. Miss Camilla Kenyon has given a jolly turn to the treasure-hunt yarn...". The Milwaukee Sentinel also reviewed Spanish Doubloons and mentioned it was sold for only $1.50 at the time. Spanish Again told in the first person, by the eighteen-year-old heroine, this is a story of romance and adventure set in the fictional Sierra mountains hamlet of Bandy's Flat, a community where gold was mined years earlier. This book has also been reprinted and is currently available in paperback.

Camilla Kenyon's first known publication was a 1904 magazine article entitled "A Sierra Summer", which appeared in Out West—A Magazine of the Old Prairie and the New, and was included in a hardbound collection of issues, Volume XXI, July–December 1904. Her next known publication was of a poem, "Departures," which appeared in McClure's magazine in 1910. In the period from April 1917 to November 1918, she published six stories in magazines, as follows: in Munsey's Magazine, March, 1917, her short story "The Second Generation" appeared. In Sunset magazine, April 1917, the short story "Tuesday" was published. In Sunset Magazine, May 1917, her short story "The Runaways" appeared. Her story "Treasure From The Sea" appeared in the October 1917 Sunset magazine. A two-part short story, "Nanny and her Lordship," appeared in the Sunset magazines for September and October, 1918. In November, 1918, her story "The Camofleurs" was published and both "Dust and Ashes" and "Claudia and the Conquering Hero" the following year in Sunset Magazine, which during this period was headquartered in San Francisco. She also appeared at Sunset's "Rodeo of Literary Lions" on February 19, 1919. That year, she also published a story in the Guy E. Morton book Balking the Bootlegger, a book about the methods followed for detecting the illegal sale of liquor which Maclean's called "interesting and amusing".

In 1922, her short The Candor of Augusta Claire appeared in Scribner's Magazine. In April 1923, a novella of hers entitled The House In The Hollow was published in Munsey's Magazine. This mystery and romance story is set in the fictional California coastal town of Briones, and is told in the third person.

In addition to the works listed above, a 1933 novel entitled Dark Hollow was published in England by Grayson and Grayson, with the author given as Camilla Kenyon. It has not so far been established whether this later work is by the same Camilla Kenyon who was the author of Spanish Doubloons and Fortune At Bandy's Flat.

No verifiable information on the life of Camilla Kenyon the author is available. (Note that there was an American painter of the same name. She is a different individual). She was also a frequent attendee and speaker at events across Berkeley, California in the 1920s, including the historic St. John's Presbyterian Church. and, into the 1940s, she also taught creative writing classes in Oakland, California. Some websites regarding magazine fiction stories of the early 1900s state that Camilla Kenyon was born in San Francisco in 1876, but there is no factual confirmation currently available for this point.

== Published works ==
=== Novels ===
- Spanish Doubloons (Bobbs-Merrill, 1919)
- Fortune At Bandy's Flat (Bobbs-Merrill, 1921)

=== Short stories ===
- "A Sierra Summer", Out West—A Magazine of the Old Prairie and the New, 1904
- "The Second Generation", Munsey's Magazine, March 1917
- "Tuesday", Sunset, April 1917
- "The Runaways", Sunset, May 1917
- "Treasure From The Sea", Sunset, October 1917
- "Nanny and her Lordship", Sunset, September and October 1918
- "The Camofleurs", Sunset, November 1918

=== Other ===
- "Departures", poem, McClure's, 1910
- The House In The Hollow, novella, Munsey's Magazine, April 1923
