= Steve Brodie (bridge jumper) =

American folk figure (1861–1901)

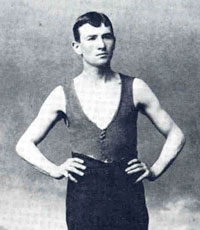
- Steve Brodie, c. 1885
- Born: December 25, 1861; Manhattan, New York City, U.S.
- Died: January 31, 1901 (aged 39); San Antonio, Texas, U.S.
- Occupation: Actor

Steve Brodie (December 25, 1861 – January 31, 1901) was an American from Manhattan, New York City, who claimed to have jumped off the Brooklyn Bridge on July 23, 1886, and survived. Brodie parlayed the alleged jump into a thriving saloon and a career as a performer. Prior to this he was penniless, having lost significant sums of money on betting and race tracks.

Brodie's fame persisted long after his death, with Brodie portrayed in films and with the slang term "Brodie"—as in to "do a Brodie"—entering American vernacular, meaning to take a chance or a leap, specifically a suicidal one.

During the 1890s, Brodie was compared to one of the best British champion divers and bridge jumpers of the era, Tommy Burns.

== Early life ==
Brodie was born on the east side of Bowery in New York City, just three days after his father was killed in a street brawl, and grew up locally, selling newspapers and blacking shoes around the city. In his youth, he was credited with many rescues from the water, such as of two young women who fell from an excursion barge. He is also known to have rescued actress Jennie Rhett, who presented him with a gold locket for his bravery.

== Career ==
=== Alleged bridge jump ===
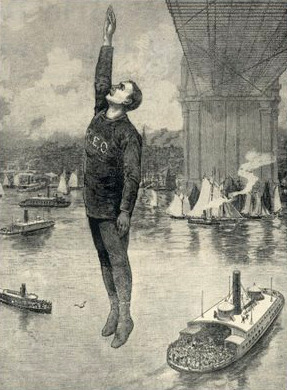
Odlum's fatal jump

The bridge, then known as the East River Bridge, had opened just three years before Brodie's claimed jump. A swimming instructor from Washington, D.C., named Robert Emmet Odlum, the brother of women's rights activist Charlotte Odlum Smith, was killed while attempting the same stunt in May 1885.

By July 1886, Brodie was penniless, having lost a fortune on race tracks and other betting games. With the consent of his wife, the jump supposedly made by Brodie on July 23, 1886, was from a height of 135 feet (41 m), the same as a 14-story building. The contemporary New York Times account said the jump was from a height of about 120 feet (37 m).

The New York Times backed his account of the jump and said that Brodie practiced for the leap by making shorter jumps from other bridges and ships' masts, and that it was witnessed by two reporters. He leaped into the East River, feet first, and emerged uninjured, though with pain on his right side. He was jailed after the jump. The Times described Brodie as a "newsboy and long-distance pedestrian" who jumped from the bridge to win a $200 bet, equal to $7,200 today. In other accounts he is described as a bookmaker and gambler.

A Bowery storekeeper named Isaac Meyers claimed that he encouraged Brodie to jump off the Brooklyn Bridge after Brodie said that he wanted to be famous. Another account holds that Moritz Herzber, a liquor dealer, offered to back a saloon for Brodie if he made the jump and lived.

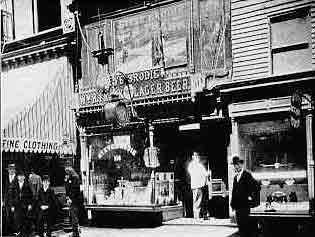
Steve Brodie's bar on the Bowery circa 1886

If the claim is true, he was the first person to have jumped off the bridge and survived, but his claim was disputed. It was subsequently alleged that a dummy was thrown from the bridge and that Brodie slipped out of a rowboat.

==== Controversy ====
Doubt whether Brodie actually made the claimed jump arose immediately and has lingered to this day.

Brodie, who was unemployed and aware of the publicity generated by Odlum's fatal jump, bragged to his pals on the Bowery that he would take the jump. Wagers were made for and against, but Brodie never announced when he would make the attempt. The Brooklyn Eagle reported in 1930 that a retired police sergeant and friend of Brodie, Thomas K. Hastings, said that Brodie had told him that he didn't make the leap and never said he did.

In his book The Great Bridge, historian David McCullough said that he probably did not make the jump. McCullough said that it was commonly believed by skeptics that a dummy was dropped from the bridge, and that Brodie merely swam out from shore and surfaced beside a passing barge.

The New York Police Department said in 1986, the 100th anniversary of the supposed jump, that two or three people jump from the bridge every year and some live. Only one month after Brodie's jump, Larry Donovan jumped from an even higher point of the bridge, making him the first confirmed survivor of a Brooklyn Bridge leap.

=== Other jumps ===
On November 9, 1888, Brodie jumped from the Poughkeepsie Railroad Bridge (now the Walkway over the Hudson) at a height of 222 feet into the Hudson River. He earned $500 (equal to $17,917 today) for the stunt, and contemporary reports differ on whether he escaped serious injury or was seriously injured in the stunt. Shortly afterwards, he was quoted as saying that he was "not disposed to try bridge-jumping again".

In 1889, Brodie was arrested when he dived off Horseshoe Falls. The magistrate in Canada said he would release him if Brodie denied making the jump. While Brodie unconvincingly denied this at first, he subsequently retracted this denial when told to swear to it, telling the magistrate, "No, I'd rather rot in jail than swear to a lie. I did go over the falls. Do with me as you please." His feat was questioned by some, which highly incensed him.

=== Competition ===
During the 1890s, Brodie was compared unfavourably to one of the best British champion divers and bridge jumpers of the era, Tommy Burns, with the Baltimore Express suggesting that Burns' dives put Brodie's and other bridge jumpers' efforts "in the shade", while the Evening Tribune suggested Burns was "greater than Steve Brodie of bridge jumping".

=== Acting ===
Capitalizing on his reputation, Brodie became an actor, appearing in the vaudeville musicals Mad Money and On the Bowery, and opened a saloon in Buffalo, New York.

== Personal life ==
After the jump, Brodie opened a saloon at 114 Bowery near Grand Street, which also became a museum for his bridge-jumping stunt. Among the decorations was an affidavit from the boat captain who claimed to have pulled him from the water.

Brodie was known to give to charity, such as during the difficult period of the 1890s when he would give away food including bread and sausages, as well as coffee from his cafe to the needy and homeless. Thousands of people benefited from his generosity.

== Death ==
Brodie died in San Antonio, Texas, on January 31, 1901 with his family members by his bedside. The cause of death has been variously described as diabetes and tuberculosis. He left $100,000 (equivalent to $3,870,000 in 2025) in his will, with the bulk of his estate left to his eldest daughter, Irene Brodie, in trust until his other two children came of age, at which point it was distributed equally. His estate comprised around $75,000 (equivalent to $2,902,500 in 2025) in real estate and roughly $30,000 (equivalent to $1,161,000 in 2025) in cash. He was survived by his wife, two daughters and a son.

== In popular culture ==
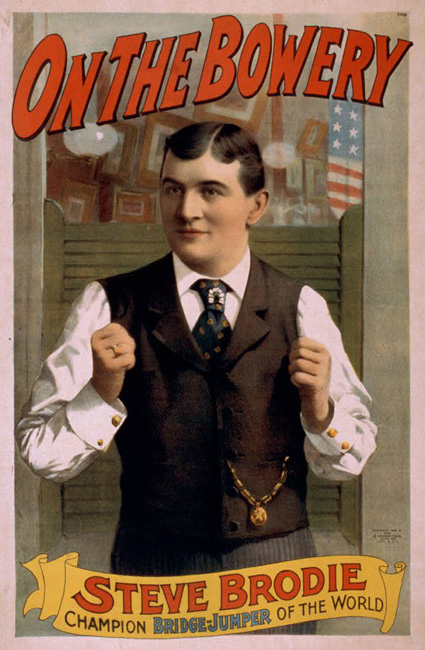
Lithograph promoting On the Bowery

Brodie became a popular symbol of the Bowery and appeared personally in musical shows, and his character was used many times in film depictions of old New York. He starred in a three-act play titled On the Bowery by Robert Neilson Stephens, which opened in 1894. A facsimile of Brodie's saloon was the setting for the second act, and Brodie sang a song, "My Poil Is a Bowery Goil". Valerie Bergere played Blanche Livingstone, the girl he rescues and then falls in love with. The play culminated with Brodie jumping off the bridge.

George Raft portrayed Brodie in the 1933 movie The Bowery which presents a fictional account of Brodie's dive. Years later, an actor named John Stevenson used Brodie's name for his movie stage name. In the 1946 noir film The Dark Corner (starring Lucille Ball and Mark Stevens), a taxi driver, when asked about William Bendix's gangster character falling to his death, said he "[n]ever saw anyone ever pull a Brodie and bounce." Brodie is also referenced in the 1947 Preston Sturges film, The Sin of Harold Diddlebock. In Samuel Fuller's 1952 film, Park Row, Brodie is portrayed by George O'Hanlon.

In 1949, Warner Brothers released the Merrie Melodies cartoon Bowery Bugs, in which Bugs Bunny tells an old man the story of the Steve Brodie jump (Brodie's name is spelled "BRODY" on a plaque on the bridge in the spot where "Brody" supposedly jumped from). At the end, Bugs says to the old man, "And that's why Steve Brody jumped off the Brooklyn Bridge. Anything more you want to know?" and the old man replies, "Nope. That's enough, son. I'll buy it" - the implication being that Bugs is selling him the bridge. Bugs then breaks the fourth wall with a wink as the old man starts counting money into Bugs's hand.

The flop 1965 Broadway musical Kelly was inspired by Brodie and climaxes with the lead character, Hop Kelly, completing the dive.

The phrase "taken a Brody" is used in Thomas Pynchon's 1963 novel V.: "And next day she would read in the paper where Esther Harvitz, twenty-two, honors graduate of CCNY, had taken a Brody off some bridge, overpass or high building." Pynchon also used in The Crying of Lot 49: "...my best guide to the Trystero has taken a Brody." It also appears in David Foster Wallace's 1996 novel Infinite Jest: "McDade bitched at the meeting that if he had to watch Nightmare on Elm Street XXII: The Senescence one more time he was going to take a brody off the House's roof."

Automobile steering wheel spinner knobs are sometimes called Brodie knobs, after Brodie.
