= Charlotte Smith (activist) =

American reformer

Charlotte Odlum Smith (née Odlum; 1840 – 1917) was an American reformer, regarded as the foremost authority on women's working conditions. She was a formidable lobbyist for disadvantaged women, and was partly responsible for the mandatory listing of ingredients on food labels. Smith was also a magazine editor, active in gaining recognition of women inventors.

== Early life ==
Charlotte Smith was born Charlotte Odlum in or near the village of Waddington in upstate New York, in 1840. She was the oldest child of Irish immigrants, Richard Odlum and his wife Catherine. Richard is listed as "engaged in agriculture" in the 1840 census. After a difficult childhood (three siblings dying as infants, father soon absent, mother supporting Charlotte and her three surviving brothers by keeping boarders, frequent moves interrupting her education), she became the head of the household after Richard's death in the mid-1850s. During this period the Odlums traveled to New Orleans, then to New York City, Boston, Detroit, Cleveland, and Montreal, Quebec, Canada. These journeys were made partly in search of medical care for Catherine Odlum, who was suffering from a diseased tooth.

Before she was twenty, Charlotte was running her own shop in St. Louis, Missouri, while her mother ran a boardinghouse. In 1860 Charlotte, her mother and two of her brothers traveled to Cuba, returning to New Orleans from Havana on March 21, 1861, the same day Louisiana ratified the Confederate Constitution. When Charlotte's brother David enlisted under-age in the Civil War, the family tried to bring him back, but were trapped in occupied Memphis, Tennessee for the rest of the conflict. David, serving under the name "Charles Rogers" in the 8th Missouri Volunteer Infantry, disappeared after the Battle of Shiloh; it was never known whether he had been killed, captured or had deserted. Charlotte, however, ran the Union blockade across the Ohio River, and evidently made thousands of dollars doing so. At the same time, she and her mother were providing milk, butter, and nursing services to Union soldiers in Memphis. On April 4, 1864, the Odlums' house in Memphis was torn down by Union troops to clear an artillery firing path.

After the war, the family went to Mobile, Alabama, where Charlotte opened an enormously profitable dry goods store, and Catherine ran multiple boardinghouses. Here, Charlotte met and eventually married Edward Smith, an Irish-born merchant. The marriage failed, and almost immediately after the birth of her second son, Charlotte moved to Chicago. The bookstore she started there was destroyed by the Great Fire of 1871, and she fled with her children to St. Louis, where she published a book on the Fire, and was soon doing newspaper work.

== Editor ==
By 1873, she started her first magazine, the Inland Monthly, which was run entirely by women. This was set up with another Catholic businesswoman, Mary Nolan. This publication was noteworthy in several ways: edited by a woman, but not a women's magazine, containing unusual amounts of science but virtually nothing about suffrage, and aiming with fiction, poetry, and essays at educated readers in general. It ran until 1878, when Smith sold it for a large sum and headed for Washington, D.C. where she opened another periodical named The Working Woman.

== Lobbyist for working women ==
While in St. Louis, Smith had been awakened to the woes of the poor, including underpaid workers. She also saw the economic disadvantages of women in particular, and began calling for equal pay for equal work. She became particularly interested in the problems of prostitutes and women inventors, and resolved to try to advance their causes at the nation's capital. Swiftly obtaining the ear of Senator Henry W. Blair of New Hampshire, partly by her undercover research into working conditions for women and girls, she became a formidable lobbyist for her causes. She also founded a union of female federal clerks, called the Women's National Industrial League, brought it into the Knights of Labor, and spoke at labor conventions, sometimes as the only female delegate. In 1886 she founded her second periodical, the Working Woman. This was far more radical, and less successful, than the Inland Monthly. Very few issues survive.

== Death of brother ==
On May 19, 1885, Charlotte Smith's brother, Robert Emmet Odlum, a swimming instructor, decided to jump from the Brooklyn Bridge to prove that it was possible; he died in the attempt. Charlotte visited New York on May 28 and spoke to Coroner William H. Kennedy, who denied responsibility for removing Odlum's heart and liver.

== Women's Rescue League and cycling ==
In 1896 the Women's Rescue League, presided over by Smith, passed a resolution denouncing "bicycle riding by young women because [it produces] immoral suggestions and imprudent associations both in language and dress which have a tendency to make women not only unwomanly, but immodest as well".

== Legal reforms ==
By the early 1890s Charlotte Smith was already credited with gaining or helping to gain passage of more than fifty bills through Congress, as well as gathering data used in Senator Blair's Committee on Education and Labor, and becoming the foremost authority on working conditions for women and girls. Notable among her successful causes were Chinese Exclusion legislation and laws against the adulteration of foods, cosmetics, and medicines. She was partly responsible for the listing of ingredients on product labels. She noted that she had spent $20,000 (equivalent to about $785,000 in 2024) in her campaign for pure food.

She also founded the Woman Inventors Mutual Aid and Protective Association of the United States of America in 1891; she later moved to Boston and founded a Woman's Board of Trade and a Women's Rescue League offering training to women.

== Isabella I of Castile ==
Smith also became involved in the fight to win more of a role for women in the great World's Columbian Exposition of 1892–1893. Specifically, she fought for more recognition of Queen Isabella's enabling role in the discoveries of Christopher Columbus.

== Female inventors ==
In 1892 she founded a third periodical, the Woman Inventor which ran for two issues, and crusaded for a permanent exhibition of women's inventive work in Washington, DC. She persuaded the United States Patent Office to issue a list of all female holders of US patents to that date (1883).

== Philanthropy and news coverage ==
In addition to working through legislatures and organizations, Charlotte Smith also took direct action, personally helping many poor women and "underdogs," and providing housing for poor working girls with her own money. During these years (1880s - early 1890s), she was one of the best-known women in America, with hundreds of articles appearing about her in The New York Times, The Washington Post, the Boston Globe, and smaller newspapers as far away as Montana and Hawaii.

== Later years and death ==
The last chapter of Smith's life took place in Boston, Massachusetts, where she continued to work for her main cause, the welfare and advancement of working women, in the legislatures of Massachusetts and Maryland, as well as in Congress. Her fame diminished in her last years, and when she died in Boston in 1917, she was buried in a pauper's grave. The Boston Herald carried an obituary for Charlotte Smith stating the “champion of the working girl and indefatigable crusader against vice and everything else she has found amiss in the world about her, died from pneumonia late last night at the City Hospital. She was 65 years old. She was taken to the hospital last Friday [November 30, 1917] from her home, 36 Oak Street, [in Boston’s] south end."

== Other sources ==
- Stanley, Autumn (2009). Raising More Hell and Fewer Dahlias: The Public Life of Charlotte Smith, 1840-1917. Lehigh University Press. ISBN 978-0-934223-99-7.
- Tejera, P. (2018). Reinas de la carretera. Madrid. Ediciones Casiopea. ISBN 9788494848216 (paper) / ISBN 9788494848223 (digital). Spanish edit.
