= Eddie Lawrence =

American dramatist (1919–2014)

- Born: Lawrence Eisler; March 2, 1919; Brooklyn, New York, U.S.
- Died: March 25, 2014 (aged 95); Manhattan, New York, U.C.
- Occupation: Dramatist

Eddie Lawrence (born Lawrence Eisler; March 2, 1919 – March 25, 2014) was an American monologist, actor, singer, lyricist, playwright, artist, director and television personality, whose comic creation, "The Old Philosopher", gained him a cult following for over five decades.

== Early career ==
Born Lawrence Eisler in Brooklyn, New York, he began performing at the end of The Great Depression. As a young man, he gained a minor reputation as an original comic/raconteur who performed bizarre elocution of whimsical free verse in small clubs in the New York area as well as on the "borscht belt" circuit in the Catskills. His first confirmed radio broadcast was on Major Bowes Amateur Hour in 1943, where he did World War II-themed comic impressions of Charles Boyer, Ronald Colman, Roland Young and Clem McCarthy. A preserved audio transcript of his performance was one of the selections included 16 years later on the 1959 LP Original Amateur Hour 25th Anniversary Album (UA UXL 2). On the recording, Major Bowes is heard inviting "Larry" to come out of the audience and tell us all he knows. Lawrence later moved to Paris, France, to study painting under Fernand Léger; his paintings were signed with his birth name, Lawrence Eisler.

By the early 1950s, now known as Eddie Lawrence, he continued to appear in clubs of minor reputation, honing his comic timing, while taking bit parts in the numerous live television productions then prevalent in New York. His first major stage role was in the second revival of The Threepenny Opera, which opened at the Off-Broadway Theater deLys on September 30, 1955 (an earlier production, without him, lasted for 96 performances in March–May 1954). A member of the original cast, Lawrence sang the role of Macheath's henchman, Crook-Finger Jack. The second deLys incarnation was more successful, running over six years, for a total of 2611 performances and finally closing on December 17, 1961. However, Lawrence stayed with it less than a year while working on the monologue which was to make his name.

== The Old Philosopher ==
In September 1956, a single titled "The Old Philosopher" rose to the Billboard Top 40 chart. It turned out to be a one-hit wonder for Eddie Lawrence and paved the way for his long comedy career.

Speaking in a comically downtrodden, empathetic voice, and accompanied by an accordion rendition of "Beautiful Dreamer", he begins "Hiya, folks," followed by "You say you lost your job today..." and then a litany of improbable disasters like "ya say your wife went out for a corned beef sandwich last weekend, and the corned beef sandwich came back but she didn't", "Your daughter's goin' out with a convict", and "Your wife just confessed she gave your last 60 dollars as a deposit on an airplane hangar" or "you say you can't pull your car outa the mud and you're in the middle of nowhere and it's pouring rain and you can't get the top back up, and your paycheck's all blurred, and your foot went right through the gas and your girl's screaming bloody murder she's scared of the dark, and a stroke of lightning splits your motor in half and your suit's shrinkin up fast, and you start up the windy road on foot and 60 yards of barbed wire hits you right smack in the puss, and you both fall down in the mud and then a wild animal comes over and runs away with your shoes, and your car blows up suddenly and your windshield wiper ends up in your mouth, and you can't move and the mud's rising up to your nostrils and you're sinkin fast, and you don't hear your girl screaming any more" – a pause as the background music retires, and Eddie asks plaintively: "Is that what's troubling you, friend?"

Suddenly, cymbals crash and a brassy rendition of "National Emblem" plays as Eddie declaims in full voice,

Well, lift your head up high and take a walk in the sun with that dignity and stick-to-it-iveness and you'll show the world, you'll show them where to get off, you'll never give up, never give up, never give up— [two drumbeats] —that ship!

Those sentiments are followed by a recitation of another round of silly misfortunes and foolish optimism, then another rallying cry, and then still another round. After three rounds of this routine, Lawrence ended his number by saying: "And now, this is the Old Philosopher, saying so long, folks." This was followed by a short series of drum beats and a sound of a struggle, indicating that he used a gun on himself to commit suicide.

The success of the single made Eddie Lawrence a minor celebrity and helped the sales of his two previously released LPs. The initial one, The Garden of Eddie Lawrence (Signature SM 1003) did not make much of an impact on its original release in early 1955. It contained three comic interviews with personalities introduced as "Kiddie Star", "Wolfgang Birdwatcher" and "Fleming of the Yard", a set of brief blackout gags, a long, whimsically strange routine about plucking chickens, and three monologues delivered by the as-yet-unnamed, Old Philosopher-like character. The second LP, released in mid-1956, finally gave him the name of the title — The Old Philosopher (Coral 57103). It was the first of Lawrence's five LPs for Coral Records and proved so successful that the company realized the profitability of releasing the title routine as a single ("King Arthur's Mines," another track from the LP was on the flip side). Years later, the original "Old Philosopher" routine would be included on the compilation record, 25 Years of Recorded Comedy (Warner Bros. Records 3BX 3131).

While writing the routines for a follow-up album, he was rehearsing for his first full-fledged Broadway show. Bells Are Ringing, a new musical by Jule Styne, Betty Comden and Adolph Green, which opened at the Shubert Theatre on November 29, 1956, with Judy Holliday in the lead. In the supporting cast for most of its run, Eddie Lawrence played Sandor, with the role preserved for posterity on the original cast album (Columbia OL 5170). Closing night, more than two years and 924 performances later, was March 7, 1959.

The second Coral LP, The Side-Splitting Personality of Eddie Lawrence (CRL 57371) came out in 1957. It contained only one "Old Philosopher" track, but the other routines were the usual bizarre mix that pleased his fans. Especially deft were the parodies of The Untouchables ("The Unbreakables") and Casablanca ("Play the Music, Sol"), with an inspired impression of Peter Lorre. There were two "Old Philosopher" tracks on The Kingdom of Eddie Lawrence (Coral 57203), his next LP, which came out just before Christmas. Taking note of the season, one of the other tracks, "That Holiday Spirit" was a bizarre routine with a character whom listeners may judge to be a combination of "The Old Philosopher" and Ebenezer Scrooge, denouncing Christmas and various other holidays, including Halloween, while an annoyed, Wally Cox-like voice is heard piping up occasionally with "... will you shut up?". The album cover depicts Eddie sitting in a throne-like chair, wearing what appears to be a white bathrobe and a Prince Valiant wig held by a metallic ring shaped like the base of a crown, while gazing sideways with an exasperatedly worried expression on his face.

1959 saw the release of Eddie the Old Philosopher (Coral 57155), which contained four "Old Philosopher" routines as well as "Memories of Louise", in which a sentimental Eddie remembers his boyhood love — " ... who could predict then that from a little fibber you'd grow into a dangerous paranoid liar? ... ah, the way you used to stick your finger in my eye ... " Another well-remembered routine, "Television Highlights", was a series of parodies which sent up popular television commercials of the era. 1987–1992 saw the return of his role on Square One TV. His format remained the same, except for the fact that his litany talks about math. Whenever he said "Well, lift your head up high!", show lights flash, spotlights go out of control, and balloons and confetti fell on him.

Lawrence also did a Christmas version of the "Old Philosopher" routine.

== Cartoon series at Famous Studios ==
In 1960 he began a six-year association with Paramount's cartoon subsidiary Famous Studios, providing the voices for thirteen animated shorts, starting with In the Nicotine. He also wrote the stories for most of them, including a seven-film series about two characters named Swifty and Shorty whom he used to recreate a number of his routines, such as Panhandling on Madison Avenue and Fix That Clock (both 1964). Ultimately, however, defining changes in the financing and distribution of mass-produced short subjects, meant that neither Eddie Lawrence nor another creative talent at the studio, Ralph Bakshi could stave off the demise of the theatrical cartoon, as Famous Studios closed its doors in 1967. Eddie Lawrence's final gift for the studio was the Swifty and Shorty vehicle, Les Boys, released in January 1966. In 1994, he appeared in two episodes of Garfield and Friends as The Feline Philosopher, a parody of the Old Philosopher. Lawrence recorded his dialogue for Garfield and Friends at one of the studios where he recorded for Paramount.

All of the films, except one, clocked in at 7 minutes. An extended-length title, Abner the Baseball, was a 16-minute special seen in November 1961, based upon a tale which was among the tracks on The Kingdom of Eddie Lawrence LP. It is a first-person account by an anthropomorphized baseball describing its experience of being hit out of Briggs Stadium by Mickey Mantle in a September 10, 1960 home run against the Detroit Tigers. Bizarre whimsy, as usual, was the order of the day.

It was also in evidence in 1963's 7 Characters in Search of Eddie Lawrence (Coral 57411), his fifth and final Coral LP. It had three new "Old Philosopher" routines, including "The Lawyer's Philosopher" — "Hey there, Mouthpiece. You say you represent a man for jaywalking and they hang him? ... Is that what's marrin' your day, Darrow? Well, lift your head up high and sway that jury in a high baritone voice ... remember — if crime didn't pay, you'd be out of work!"

== Children's television host ==
Concurrent with his work on the Famous Studios cartoons, for a 13-month period from September 1963 to October 1964, baby boomers who lived within reach of New York City's television stations, also had the opportunity to see Eddie Lawrence Monday through Friday afternoons on independent station WPIX Channel 11 which, along with another New York independent, WNEW Channel 5 was, during the 1950s and 1960s, the station with the greatest number of "kiddie shows" on its broadcast schedule. The management of WPIX realized that Lawrence's monologues were popular with adolescent boys who were the core audience for The Three Stooges two-reelers shown, at the time, nationwide by television stations which considered them children's programming. Long-time WPIX children's favorite "Officer" Joe Bolton relinquished his Three Stooges post in favor of hosting Dick Tracy cartoons and Eddie Lawrence was invited to step in as the half-hour program's host. His daily recitations of "Old Philosopher" monologues and other comedy routines, most of which were only tested on the show and never committed to record, built him a faithful and dedicated audience and made him a cult figure.

== Broadway: Kelly and Sherry! ==
The hosting stint, however, came to a premature end because of another Broadway show. Lawrence had written the book and lyrics for a musical entitled Kelly. Moose Charlap was the composer, Herbert Ross the director and choreographer, and David Susskind and Joseph E. Levine the producers. With such high-powered names at the helm, there was high expectation of success and Eddie Lawrence, the show's author, was expected to assure it by attending all the rehearsals. The first preview was set for February 1, 1965 and opening night for February 6. At the end of October 1964, he hosted his final "Three Stooges show", said goodbye to his loyal viewers, and exited, trailing a banner across the television screen, emblazoned with the word KELLY.

Kelly became embroiled in controversy when producers Susskind and Levine began to demand extensive changes during rehearsals and out-of-town tryouts. While originally signing onto Lawrence's and Charlap's edgy concept of a darkly comic musical about corruption in old New York, they soon panicked over its perceived lack of commercial appeal, despite some good reviews on the road, and hired new writers in spite of the authors' objections. By the time Kelly's February 6 opening night at the Broadhurst Theatre also turned out to be its closing night, it was an entirely different show. Lawrence and Charlap subsequently brought a lawsuit charging Susskind and Levine with violation of the Dramatists Guild's clauses protecting the rights of creative artists and, ultimately, settling the case out of court for an undisclosed amount.

One lasting legacy from Kelly has been the song "I'll Never Go There Anymore", recorded by many artists over the years. Stephen Sondheim cited it in a 2000 article in The New York Times as one of the songs "I wish I had written". Eddie Lawrence was not an actor in Kelly and there was no original cast album, but he was popular enough at the time to warrant a recording of comic material and songs from the show, all performed by himself and Charlap (Original Cast Records OC 8025). A new studio recording of the complete score (Original Cast Records ASIN:B00000DGNP) was issued on CD in 1998, featuring the 79-year-old Eddie along with Brian D'Arcy James, Sally Mayes, George S. Irving, John Schuck, Marge Redmond, Jane Connell and Sandy Stewart, who was married to Moose Charlap from 1962 until his death in 1974.

A few months after the Kelly disappointment, one last LP appeared, Is That What's Bothering You Bunkie (Epic LN 24159). Taking its title from "The Old Philosopher"'s catchphrase, Bunkie contained five new "Old Philosopher" monologues and six other routines.

Eddie Lawrence continued to perform in clubs and, in 1967, joined the cast of yet another Broadway musical, Sherry!, nicknamed for Sheridan Whiteside, the acerbic literary wit and radio personality created by George S. Kaufman and Moss Hart as the title character in The Man Who Came to Dinner. Whiteside, a comically exaggerated representation of Kaufman and Hart's friend, Alexander Woollcott, was performed by Clive Revill, while Eddie's role was that of Banjo, a send-up of Woollcott's sidekick, Harpo Marx. Sherry! opened at the Alvin Theater on March 28, 1967, and closed on May 27, having played 72 performances plus 14 previews. No cast album was recorded and the score and orchestrations were lost. All that remained were the book and lyrics written by James Lipton who gained celebrity twenty-seven years later, in 1994, as the creator and host of the long-running actor-interview series Inside the Actors Studio. The music was eventually found in 1999, and a 2004 studio cast album was recorded with stars including Nathan Lane, Carol Burnett, Bernadette Peters and Tommy Tune.

== Eddie Lawrence in the movies ==
Eddie Lawrence's film appearances were, at best, an afterthought to his other activities. Between 1968 and 1978, he had small roles in five features, starting with William Friedkin's 1968 recreation of 1920 New York City, The Night They Raided Minsky's. Lawrence was hired when Bert Lahr died midway through the filming schedule of this Norman Lear-produced tribute to the early days of burlesque. Twelfth-billed as Scratch, a baggy-pants comic, Eddie performed the "Crazy House" burlesque routine originally scripted for Lahr: Eddie Lawrence is heard calling for the nurse in Lahr's distinctive Brooklyn accent ("Noice! Noice!"). Three years later, Eddie had a couple of fleeting moments as a Bowery derelict in visionary director Ernest Pintoff's little-seen noir-like oddity Who Killed Mary What's 'Er Name?, filmed on the streets of New York in 1971.

On February 22, 1971, Eddie appeared as a guest on Johnny Carson's Tonight Show (which, until May 1972, was based in New York), performing a five-minute Old Philosopher routine at the end of which Carson was laughing loudly and repeating some of its lines and, in 1974, he was heard as the announcer on a television advertisement for John Lennon and Harry Nilsson's album, Pussy Cats, which also included contributions by Ringo Starr and Keith Moon.

Eddie Lawrence's remaining three films were Blade (1973), The Wild Party (1975) and Somebody Killed Her Husband (1978). Blade reunited him with director Ernest Pintoff, an auteur whose original New York City-based films were considered to have little commercial appeal. The film follows a tough cop named Tommy Blade (John Marley) as he searches for a sadistic serial killer. Eddie has a memorable, though brief scene as a movie producer questioned by Blade. Party was Eddie's sole performing venture in California. In this Merchant–Ivory production which fictionalized the Fatty Arbuckle scandal, Eddie, made-up to resemble an approximation of Louis B. Mayer, played a grimacing movie mogul attending the titular event thrown by Jolly Grimm, the Fatty character, played by James Coco. The film was praised for its period feel, but received otherwise mixed notices and suffered botched editing and other mishandling by the distributor. Finally, Her Husband, filmed in New York by the director of a number of The Twilight Zone episodes, Lamont Johnson, with a screenplay by The Defenders creator Reginald Rose, had Eddie in a semi-comical bit as a neighbor of the titular "her" (Farrah Fawcett-Majors). Despite the creative talents involved, this initial starring vehicle for the most-publicized of Charlie's Angels got generally dismissive reviews, engendering its widely repeated disparagement, "Somebody Killed Her Career".

== Later years ==
Fourteen years after Sherry!, Eddie Lawrence had one final encounter with Broadway. At the age of 62, he was again the writer and, in his sole such outing, director of a Broadway show. The comedy Animals consisted of three one-act plays, The Beautiful Mariposa, Louie and the Elephant and Sort of an Adventure. The first of nine previews at the Princess Theater was on April 14, 1981. Like Kelly, Animals closed on its opening night, April 22. There was no cast album.

Thirteen years later and thirty years after Bunkie, his 1964 Epic release, the 75-year-old Eddie Lawrence had his first new album. 1994's The Jazzy Old Philosopher (Red Dragon JK 57756) showed that the veteran monologist had not lost his unique touch. The CD consisted of 58 minutes of the traditional and the new, with names such as Mick Jagger, Axl Rose, Boy George and Sinéad O'Connor dropped into the routines — "You say your grandpa's in the hospital again because he tried to make a citizen's arrest of Mick Jagger? Is that what's got you down in the dumps, homeboy?" He died in Manhattan on March 25, 2014, twenty-three days after his 95th birthday.

== Discography ==
- 1957 - The Old Philosopher (Coral CRL 57103)
- 1958 - The Kingdom of Eddie Lawrence (Coral CRL 57203)
- 1965 - "Is that what's bothering you, Bunkie?"
