= New York Museum =

19th century museum in New York

Coordinates: 40.721672°N 73.993770°W

The New York Museum was a short-lived dime museum at 210 Bowery in Manhattan, New York City, operating from the early 1880s to 1896. Managed by a Louis Hickman, it was refused a licence in 1883, and investigated for gambling and child prostitution in 1884, but remained in business. In 1889 it became the Fairyland Dime Museum and closed in 1896.
