= Robert Emmet Odlum =

Swimming instructor; first person to dive off Brooklyn Bridge (1851–1885)

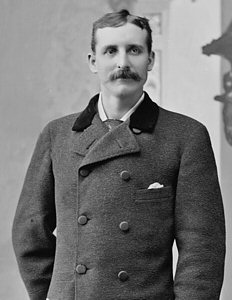
- Robert Emmet Odlum
- Born: August 31, 1851; Ogdensburg, New York, U.S.
- Died: May 19, 1885 (aged 33); New York City, New York, U.S.
- Occupations: Swimming instructor; lifeguard

Robert Emmet Odlum (August 31, 1851 – May 19, 1885) was an American swimming instructor. Odlum was the first person to jump off the Brooklyn Bridge, and was killed doing so.

== Early life ==
Robert Emmet Odlum was born in Ogdensburg, New York, on August 31, 1851, the son of Catherine and Richard Odlum. He was named after the Irish nationalist Robert Emmet. Odlum was one of seven children, only four of whom survived childhood. Odlum's elder brother David served under the name "Charles Rogers" in the 8th Missouri Infantry Regiment of the Union Army in the American Civil War, and disappeared after the Battle of Shiloh; it was never known whether he had been killed, captured or had deserted. He was the brother of women's rights activist Charlotte Smith.

Odlum was an expert swimmer as a child. After the death of Richard Odlum in the mid-1850s, the Odlums traveled to New Orleans, then to New York City, Boston, Detroit, Cleveland, and Montreal, Canada. They eventually settled in St. Louis. In 1860 they traveled to Cuba, returning to New Orleans from Havana on March 21, 1861, the same day Louisiana ratified the Confederate Constitution. In search of David Odlum, who had joined the Union Army, they traveled northward to Cairo, Illinois and Paducah, Kentucky, moving to Memphis, Tennessee in 1862. The Odlums, who had Southern sympathies but a family member in the Union Army, were trapped for much of the war in the hostile environment of Memphis, a staunchly Confederate city occupied by Union forces. On April 4, 1864, the Odlums' house in Memphis was torn down by Union troops to clear an artillery firing path. In 1865 the family moved to Mobile, Alabama.

== Career ==
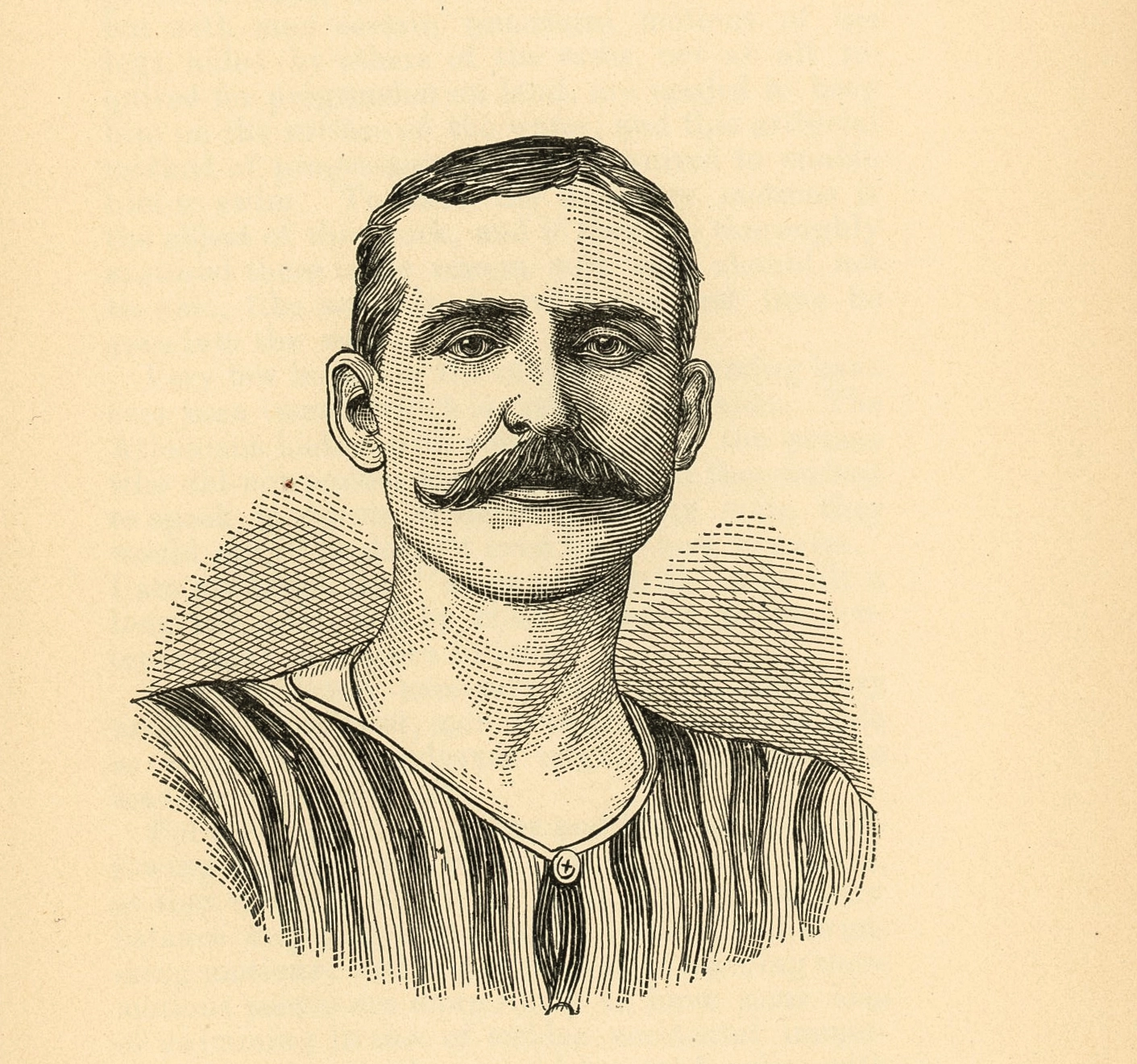
Portrait of Odlum in swimming attire

In 1869 and 1870 Odlum was a tea merchant in Philadelphia; he was also listed as a railroad conductor in the 1870 United States census. He later moved to St. Louis, where he sometimes worked for his sister Charlotte Smith's Inland Monthly magazine. Odlum lived and worked in Chicago, Illinois in the 1870s. About 1878 he relocated to Washington, D.C., where he established a swimming school called the Natatorium. Odlum became known to Washingtonians by the title of "Professor". Among Odlum's pupils at the school were Fannie Hayes, the daughter of former President Rutherford B. Hayes, the sons of Presidents Hayes and James A. Garfield, the sons of James G. Blaine and General William Tecumseh Sherman, and one of Sherman's daughters. In 1880, on the Wednesday before the Potomac River rowing race between Ned Hanlan and Charles E. Courtney, Odlum swam the entire course.

Odlum improved the Natatorium in the winter of 1880–1881. The Natatorium's opening for the season in April 1881 was attended by Lucretia Rudolph Garfield, the wife of President Garfield, and other prominent Washingtonians. Odlum also added a gymnasium to the Natatorium.

Despite his success, in spring 1881 Odlum began to grow restless in his position. According to the biography later written by Odlum's mother, on July 13, 1881, he "challenged any man in the United States to swim him for from $250 to $500 a side", but no one would take up the bet. Odlum frequently exhibited his skill as a swimmer and diver for passengers on Potomac excursion steamers. On July 4, 1881, Odlum jumped 90 feet (27 m) from the wooden bridge at Occoquan Falls.

In June 1882, Odlum and aquatic adventurer Paul Boyton performed for an excursion party traveling from Washington to Marshall Hall, Maryland. At the Marshall Hall wharf, Odlum jumped 110 feet (34 m) from the top of a ladder on the deck of the steamer into the water. He was uninjured even though he entered the water at a slight angle.

=== Fort Monroe ===
After the Natatorium failed financially and was closed, Odlum was employed as professor of swimming and lifeguard at the Hygeia Hotel at Fort Monroe in Hampton, Virginia. On August 10, 1882, Odlum swam 18 miles (29 km) from Old Point Comfort to Ocean View and back, swimming against the tide in Hampton Roads for the last half-hour. While employed at the Hygeia Hotel, Odlum saved the life of "Sky" Colfax, the sixteen-year-old son of former Vice President Schuyler Colfax, as well as two other swimmers. Odlum, who had previously contracted malaria at Lower Cedar Point, contracted it again while at the Hygeia Hotel.

Odlum was a friend of Matthew Webb, who died in 1883 in an attempt to swim through the Whirlpool Rapids below Niagara Falls.

== Death ==
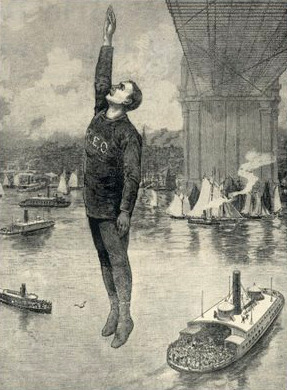
Odlum jumps from Brooklyn Bridge to his death

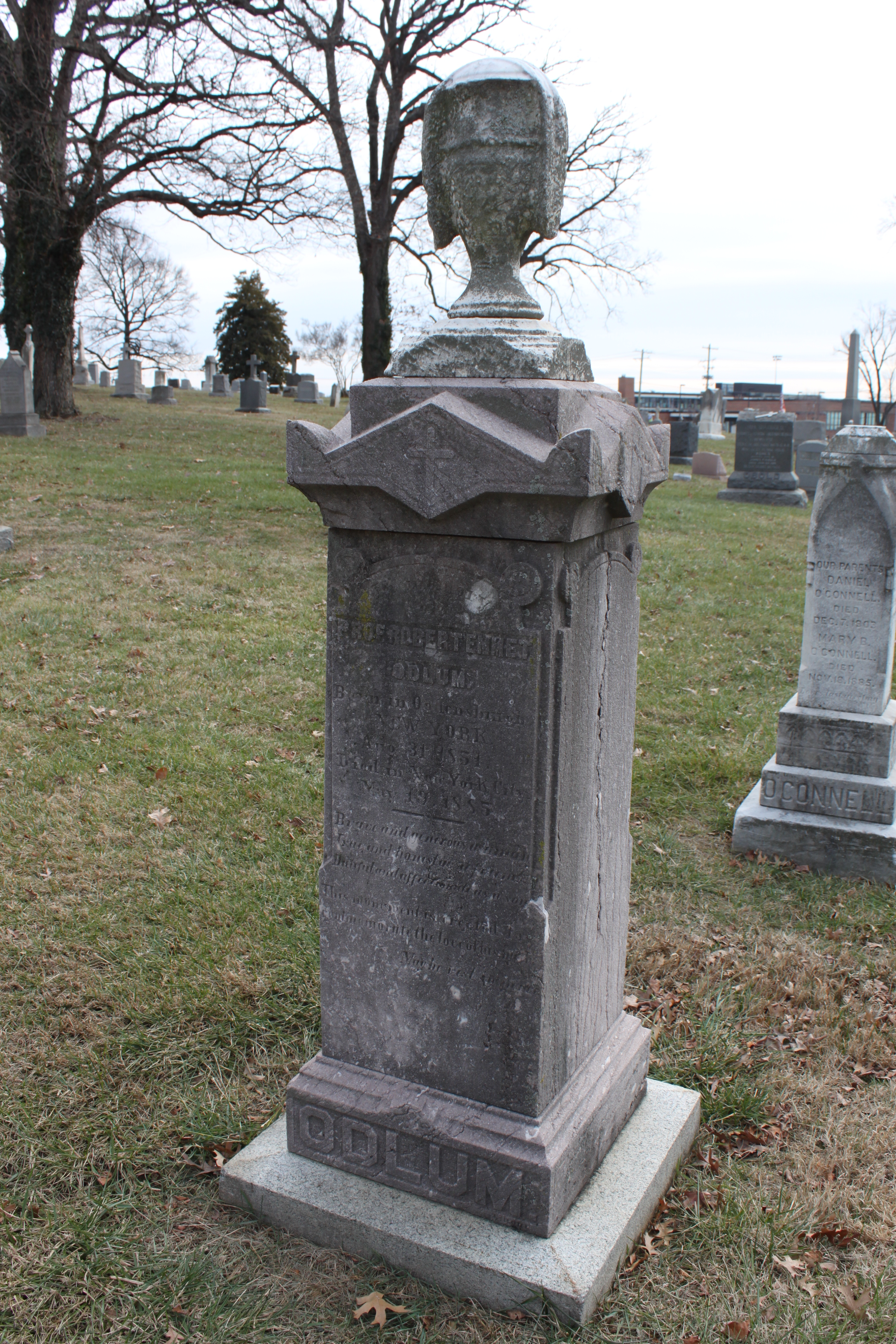
Grave of Odlum at Mount Olivet Cemetery

On May 19, 1885, Odlum became the first person to jump into the East River from the Brooklyn Bridge that connects Manhattan and Brooklyn. His motivations for doing so included the desire to demonstrate that people do not die simply from falling through the air, thus encouraging people to be willing to jump from a burning building into a net. Odlum also desired fame and the chance to help himself and his mother financially.

On the morning of May 19, Odlum entertained a party of acquaintances at Paul Boyton's "Ship", including boxer Paddy Ryan, wrestler William Muldoon, and actor Henry E. Dixey. Paul Boyton later claimed to have learned that Odlum had visited the Church of the Redemptorist Fathers that morning and had gone to confession and received communion. The police had been alerted to Odlum's plans. Odlum sent two friends, James Haggart and a Mr. Cluss, onto the bridge in a cab so that Haggart could decoy the police by pretending to be the jumper. A tugboat containing spectators for the jump sailed to within a hundred yards of the bridge, with a rescue swimmer hired by Odlum on board.

Odlum jumped from the Brooklyn Bridge at 5:35 p.m. A strong wind was blowing when Odlum jumped and seemed to turn him slightly in the air. As a result, he struck the water at an angle, hitting the water with his feet and right hip. The rescue swimmer failed to act, but Boyton swam to Odlum in the water. Odlum was lifted into a boat and brought to the tug's galley, where Ryan and Muldoon assisted in resuscitation efforts. Odlum briefly regained consciousness, asking, "Is it all over?...Did I make a good jump?" Arterial blood began dripping from Odlum's mouth, causing him to ask, "Am I spitting blood?" Robertson, a friend of Odlum from Boston, reassured him that the fluid was only brandy. Without speaking further, Odlum began to hemorrhage internally. He died at 6:18 p.m., before the ambulance summoned by Muldoon and Jere Dunn could arrive. An undertaker's wagon carried Odlum's body to the rooms of William H. Kennedy, the Coroner of New York City.

The autopsy revealed that Odlum's spleen, liver and kidneys were ruptured. A deposit of tuberculosis was found at the base of his left lung. Odlum's first, third and fifth ribs were broken. The cause of death was determined to be concussion.

Odlum's funeral took place in Washington, D.C. Among the tributes was a floral representation of the Brooklyn Bridge, sent by Odlum's comrades from the Washington Light Infantry. The Roman Catholic burial service was performed by Father Ahern of St. Matthew's, whose homily paid tribute to Odlum's life-saving efforts. Odlum was buried at Mount Olivet Cemetery.

== Aftermath ==
Odlum's sister, Charlotte Smith, visited New York on May 28 and spoke to Coroner Kennedy, who denied responsibility for removing Odlum's heart and liver. Odlum's mother, Catherine Odlum, blamed Paul Boyton for her son's death. Boyton wrote Mrs. Odlum a letter disclaiming responsibility, which he also published in The New York Times and other periodicals. Mrs. Odlum subsequently traveled to New York City to see Boyton. According to her account, Boyton sent two men to see her who claimed to be a lawyer and a judge, and who warned her not to say anything against Boyton to avoid prosecution for slander. Catherine Odlum claimed that Boyton hid or destroyed letters and telegrams from himself to Robert Odlum urging him to travel to New York and make the Brooklyn Bridge jump. She wrote a biography of her son, The Life and Adventures of Prof. Robert Emmet Odlum, Containing an Account of his Splendid Natatorium at the National Capital..., published in 1885.

On July 23, 1886, Steve Brodie supposedly became the first man to survive a jump off the Brooklyn Bridge, although it would later be alleged that Brodie faked the jump by having a friend throw a dummy from the bridge. The first confirmed survivor of a Brooklyn Bridge leap was Larry Donovan, who jumped the month after Brodie claimed to have done so.

== Personal life ==
Robert Emmet Odlum never married. He lived with his mother and sister for much of his adult life.
