= The Conquering Hero =

Musical

- Page from sheet music (cropped)
- Music: Mark Charlap
- Lyrics: Norman Gimbel
- Book: Larry Gelbart
- Productions: 1961 Broadway

The Conquering Hero is a musical with a music by Mark Charlap, lyrics by Norman Gimbel, and book by Larry Gelbart. The musical was based on Preston Sturges's 1944 film Hail the Conquering Hero. The musical ran for only eight performances on Broadway in 1961.

== Production ==
The musical was originally staged and choreographed by Bob Fosse, who was replaced during previews by Albert Marre as director and Todd Bolender as choreographer. The New York Times reported that Fosse quit over a disagreement "over the direction of the show's book." Settings and lighting were by Jean Rosenthal.

Produced by Robert Whitehead and Roger L. Stevens, the musical opened on January 16, 1961 at the ANTA Playhouse, where it ran for eight performances. Featured in the cast were Tom Poston and Lionel Stander. The New York Times reviewer noted that neither the director nor the choreographer was listed in the program, and went on to write "Whoever mixed the ingredients failed to produce freshness or excitement." The reviewer did note that the first act ended with "an extended dance number that has speed and spirit."

During out-of-town tryouts in Philadelphia, Gelbart was quoted as saying "If Hitler's alive, I hope he's out of town with a musical."

== Songs ==
Act I

- "Girls! Girls!"
- "Five Shots of Whiskey"
- "Hail, the Conquering Hero!"
- "Must Be, Given to You"
- "Wonderful, Marvelous You"
- "Truth"
- "Won't you Marry Me?"
- "The River Bank"
- "Only Rainbows"
- "The Campaign"

Act II

- "One Mother Each"
- "I’m Beautiful"
- "Rough Times"
- "Yours, All Yours"
- "What I Mean to Say"
