= Moose Charlap =

American Broadway composer (1928–1974)

- Born: Morris Isaac Charlip; December 19, 1928; Philadelphia, Pennsylvania, U.S.
- Died: July 8, 1974 (aged 45); Manhattan, New York, U.S.
- Other name: Moose Charlap
- Known for: Peter Pan (1954)
- Spouse: Sandy Stewart
- Relatives: Bill Charlap (son)

Morris Isaac "Moose" Charlap (né Charlip; December 19, 1928 – July 8, 1974) was an American Broadway composer best known for Peter Pan (1954), for which Carolyn Leigh wrote the lyrics. The idea for the show came from Jerome Robbins, who planned to have a few songs by Charlap and Leigh. It evolved into a full musical, with additional songs by Jule Styne and Betty Comden and Adolph Green. The original run of Peter Pan on Broadway starred Mary Martin as Peter Pan and Cyril Ritchard as Captain Hook.

== Career ==
Charlap was also the composer for the 1969 television movie musical Hans Brinker, which had lyrics by Alvin Cooperman and starred Eleanor Parker (her singing voice was her own), Richard Basehart, John Gregson, Robin Askwith, Roberta Tovey, Sheila Whitmill, and Cyril Ritchard. It was based on the novel by Mary Mapes Dodge. Charlap also wrote the song "First Impression" with lyrics by Carolyn Leigh. The song was dropped from the original 1954 production of Peter Pan but was recorded by Eydie Gorme in 1956. Other songs Charlap wrote that were not included in musicals include "English Muffins and Irish Stew," "Mademoiselle," "Great Day in the Morning," "My Favorite Song," and "Young Ideas." Ella Fitzgerald recorded his "My Favorite Song" for Decca Records with an orchestra directed by Leroy Kirkland. Charlap was also a recording artist and had a single, "Good Old Fashioned Lovin'/It Was My Father's Habit," released on ABC in 1956.

== Family ==
Born Morris Isaac Charlip to a Jewish family in Philadelphia, he married singer Sandy Stewart, whose biggest hit was "My Coloring Book" in 1962. Jazz pianist Bill Charlap is their son. They also had a daughter, Katherine. He and his first wife, Elizabeth, were the parents of a daughter, Anne, and son, Tom, a bass player.

Charlap, who lived with his wife and children on Manhattan's East Side, died at Lenox Hill Hospital in 1974 at the age of 45.

== Musicals ==
- Peter Pan (1954, revivals in 1979, 1990, 1991, 1998, 1999)
- Whoop-Up (1958)
- The Conquering Hero (1961)
- Through the Looking Glass (1966) – television musical
- Kelly (1965)
- Jerome Robbins' Broadway (musical revue; 1989), featured as songwriter for "Peter Pan"
- Clown Around (1972)
