= Junoon discography =

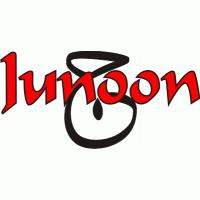
- Junoon Logo
- Studio albums: 7
- Soundtrack albums: 1
- Live albums: 2
- Compilation albums: 5
- Singles: 36
- Video albums: 4
- Music videos: 19

Junoon is a Pakistani sufi rock band founded in 1990 by lead guitarist Salman Ahmad. The band has released seven studio albums, as well as numerous live albums, compilations, singles, video albums, music videos, and soundtracks. Keyboardist Nusrat Hussain left the band after the first studio album release and was replaced by bassist Brian O'Connell. The band released their self-titled debut album in 1991, which barely made a dent in the Pakistani music industry. Guitarist Mekaal Hasan and band producer John Alec replaced O'Connell, and have been playing bass for live shows since O'Connell's departure.

Although Junoon has been prominent in their home country since the release of their first single, "Talaash" (1993) and debut self-titled album Junoon, they did not achieve worldwide fame until the release of the albums Inquilaab, Azadi and Parvaaz, which were released in 1996, 1997 and 1999 respectively. Their 1997 album, Azadi, has sold more than half million copies, and hit platinum sales status in a record four weeks. Their biggest hit single, "Sayonee" (1997), became an instant hit in South Asia and the Middle East, shooting to the top of all the Asian charts, and staying at #1 on both Channel V and MTV Asia for over two months. The band produced an overall two singles and two music videos from the album, the other single being "Yaar Bina".

Two years after the release of the seventh studio album, Dewaar, vocalist Ali Azmat left the band to pursue his career as a solo music artist. Guitarist Salman Ahmad also released a solo album in 2005.

Junoon is South Asia's most successful band with more than 30 million sold albums worldwide. Although Junoon's two other members, Ali Azmat and Brain O'Connell, left the band in 2005, Salman Ahmad continues to perform as a solo artist under the "Junoon" label and has moved to New York City after his solo career failed to take off in Pakistan.

== Studio albums ==
Year	Album information
1991	Junoon: Released: September 30, 1991; Singles: "Khwab", "Neend Athi Nahin", "Heer"; Recorded: 1990–1991 at EMI Studios, Karachi, Pakistan; Label: EMI Music Distribution; Producer: Salman Ahmad
1993	Talaash: Released: September 3, 1993; Singles: "Bheegi Yaadein", "Talaash"; Recorded: 1992–1993 at Studio & Sound Studios, Karachi, Pakistan; Label: EMI Music Distribution; Producer: Salman Ahmad, Brian O'Connell
1996	Inquilaab: Released: January 1, 1996 (re-released on October 20, 1998); Singles: "Jazba-e-Junoon", "Dosti", "Rooh Ki Pyas", "Mein Kaun Hoon"; Recorded: 1994–1996 Recorded at Amir Hassan Studios, Karachi, Pakistan; Label: EMI Music Distribution, VCI Records; Producer: Salman Ahmad, Brian O'Connell
1997	Azadi: Released: August 14, 1997 (re-released on July 11, 2000 & April 9, 2002); Recorded: 1996–1997; Singles: "Khudi", "Meri Awaz Suno", "Sayonee", "Yaar Bina"; Label: EMI Music Distribution, VCI Records; Producer: John Alec, Salman Ahmad
1999	Parvaaz: Released: January 1, 1999; Singles: "Bulleya", "Ghoom", "Mitti", "Sajna", "Sanwal"; Recorded: 1998–1999 at Abbey Road Studios, London, United Kingdom; Label: EMI Music Distribution, Lips Records; Producer: John Alec, Salman Ahmad
2001	Ishq (released internationally as "Andaz"): Released: March 15, 2001; Singles: "Chal Kurriye", "Chaen", "Ishq"; Recorded: 2000–2001 at Grandview Studios in New York City, United States; Label: EMI Music Distribution, SADAF (Pakistan); Producer: John Alec, Salman Ahmad
2003	Dewaar: Released: December 1, 2003; Singles: "Deewar", "Baarish", "Garaj Baras", "Maza Zindagi Ka", "Hungama", "Ghoom Taana"; Recorded: 2002–2003 at Imaad Studios at Karachi, Pakistan and J.A. Studios in New York City, United States; Label: EMI Music Distribution, SADAF (Pakistan); Producer: John Alec, Salman Ahmad
2016	Door: Released: December 26, 2016; Singles: "Door Bohat Door", "Love Can You Take Me Back", "Open Your Eyes", "Ghoom Taana"; Recorded: 2009–2016 at Shahi Hassan Studios Islamabad, Pakistan; Label: Universal Music Group; Producer: Shahzad Hassan, Salman Ahmad
TBA 9th Studio Music Album	9th Studio Music Album: Released: TBA; Singles: "CHOOLAY AASMAN"; Recorded: 2019–2023 at Karach & New York City; Label: Universal Music Group & Junoon Band Official Youtube Music & Spotify; Producer: Shahzad Hassan, Salman Ahmad & John Alec

== Soundtracks ==
Year	Album information
2010	Rock & Roll Jihad: Released: June 1, 2010; Singles: "Love Can You Take Me Back"; Recorded: 2009–2010 J.A. Studios in New York City, United States; Label: Nameless Sufi Music; Producer: Salman Ahmad

== Compilation albums ==
Year	Album information
1995	Kashmakash: Released: 1995; Singles: "Meri Awaz Suno", "Husan Walo", "Saeein", "Ehtesaab"; Label: EMI Music Distribution, VCI Records
1998	Dosti: Released: 1998; Singles: "Dosti", "Husan Walo"; Label: Virgin Records India
2000	Millennium 1990–2000: Released: 2000; Singles: "Azadi", "Muk Gaye Nay", "Allah Hu (Live)"; Label: SADAF (Pakistan)
2004	Dewaar: The Best of Junoon: Released: April 27, 2004; Singles: "Pappu Yaar", "Sayonee", "Garaj Baras", "Taara Jala", "Saeein"; Label: EMI Music Distribution
2011	Junoon 20: Released: September 29, 2011 (Volume I); Singles: "Open Your Eyes (Pakistan Humara)", "Neend Aati Nahin" (feat. Laal), "Saeein" (feat. Usman Riaz); Label: Nameless Sufi Music

== Live albums ==
Year	Album information
2001	Daur-e-Junoon: Released: March 29, 2001; Singles: "Garaj Baras" Live Songs: "Heer Alaap", "Sayonee", "Jazba 2001"; Label: Sadaf Stereo; Producer: John Alec, Salman Ahmad
2002	Junoon for Peace: Released: 2002; Singles: "No More", "Khudi", "Bulleya"; Label: Nameless Music; Producer: Salman Ahmad

== Video albums ==
Year	Album information
2000	The Videos 1990–2000: Released: 2000; Label: Lips Records; Producer: Salman Ahmad; Format: VCD, DVD
2002	United for Peace: Released: 2002; Label: Nameless Music; Producer: Salman Ahmad; Format: VCD, DVD
2004	Ghoom Taana: Released: 2004; Producer: Salman Ahmad; Format: DVD

== See also ==
- List of Junoon songs
