= List of songs recorded by Junoon =

The Pakistani sufi rock band Junoon has released seven studio albums, as well as numerous live albums, compilations, singles, and video albums. This list does not include live versions or remixes.

== Original songs ==
Title	Release	Year	Composer(s)
"A Game of Chance"	Junoon	1991	Salman Ahmad
"Aap Aur Hum"	Talaash	1993	Salman Ahmad
"Ab tu Jaag"	Parvaaz	1999	Bulleh Shah, Salman Ahmad
"Aleph"	Parvaaz	1999	Bulleh Shah, Salman Ahmad
"Azadi"	Andaz	2001	Ali Azmat; Sabir Zafar, Salman Ahmad
"Baarish"	Dewaar	2004	Sabir Zafar, Salman Ahmad
"Balama"	Dewaar	2004	Salman Ahmad
"Barzakh"	Talaash	1993	Salman Ahmad
"Bheegi Yaadein"	Talaash	1993	Salman Ahmad
"Bulleya"	Parvaaz	1999	Bulleh Shah, Salman Ahmad
"Bulleya/Lonely Heart"	Rock & Roll Jihad	2010	Andrew McCord, Salman Ahmad
"Chaen"	Andaz	2001	Sabir Zafar, Salman Ahmad
"Chalay Thay Saath"	Inquilaab	1996	Sabir Zafar, Salman Ahmad
"Chori Chori"	Junoon	1991	Sabir Zafar, Arshad Mahmud
"Chul Kuriye"	Andaz	2001	Sabir Zafar, Salman Ahmad
"Dewaar"	Dewaar	2004	Ali Azmat, Sabir Zafar, Salman Ahmad
"Dharti Keh Khuda"	Andaz	2001	Ali Azmat; Sabir Zafar
"Dil Nahin Lag Raha"	Azadi	1997	Sabir Zafar, Salman Ahmad
"Dosti"	Inquilaab	1996	Ali Azmat, Sabir Zafar, Salman Ahmad
"Downtown Princess"	Junoon	1991	Ali Azmat, Salman Ahmad
"Ghaflat"	Talaash	1993	Salman Ahmad
"Garaj Baras"	Dewaar	2004	Ali Azmat, Sabir Zafar
"Ghoom"	Parvaaz	1999	Salman Ahmad, Shah Hussain
"Ghoom Taana"	Dewaar	2004	Sabir Zafar, Salman Ahmad
"Heer"	Junoon and Azadi	1991, 1997	Salman Ahmad
"Heeray"	Talaash	1993	Sabir Zafar, Salman Ahmad
"Himalayan Song"	Talaash	1993	Salman Ahmad
"Hungama"	Dewaar	2004	Sabir Zafar, Salman Ahmad
"Husan Walo"	Inquilaab	1996	Ali Azmat, Sabir Zafar, Salman Ahmad
"I Am Because U R"	Rock & Roll Jihad	2010	Andrew McCord, Salman Ahmad
"If You Want"	Talaash	1993	Salman Ahmad
"Iltija"	Inquilaab	1996	Salman Ahmad
"Ishq"	Andaz	2001	Sabir Zafar, Salman Ahmad
"Janey Tu"	Andaz	2001	Sabir Zafar, Salman Ahmad
"Jazba-e-Junoon"	Inquilaab	1996	Salman Ahmad
"Jeeain"	Junoon	1991	Sabir Zafar
"Jhulle Lal"	Dewaar	2004	Sabir Zafar, Salman Ahmad
"Jogia"	Junoon	1991	Sabir Zafar
"Kaisay Gaaon Main"	Andaz	2001	Sabir Zafar, Salman Ahmad
"Kisne Suna"	Azadi	1997	Sabir Zafar, Salman Ahmad
"Khoeey Ankhein"	Inquilaab	1996	Salman Ahmad
"Khudi"	Azadi	1997	Muhammad Iqbal, Salman Ahmad
"Khwaab"	Junoon	1991	Irtaza Barlas
"Kyun Parishan"	Azadi	1997	Sabir Zafar, Salman Ahmad
"Lady Magic"	Talaash	1993	Salman Ahmad
"Lal Meri Pat"	Azadi	1997	Sabir Zafar, Salman Ahmad
"Loishay"	Azadi	1997	Sabir Zafar, Salman Ahmad
"Love Can You Take Me Back"	Rock & Roll Jihad and Door	2010, 2016	Andrew McCord, Salman Ahmad
"Mahiwal"	Azadi	1997	Sabir Zafar, Salman Ahmad
"Maza Zindagi Ka"	Dewaar	2004	Sabir Zafar, Salman Ahmad
"Mein Kaun Hoon"	Inquilaab	1996	Salman Ahmad
"Mein Nay Kabhi"	Inquilaab	1996	Ali Azmat, Salman Ahmad
"Mera Mahi"	Inquilaab	1996	Salman Ahmad
"Meray Pass Aja"	Junoon	1991	Naila Ansari, Salman Ahmad
"Meri Awaz Suno"	Azadi	1997	Sabir Zafar, Salman Ahmad
"Mitti"	Parvaaz	1999	Sabir Zafar, Salman Ahmad
"Mukh Gae"	Azadi	1997	Sabir Zafar, Salman Ahmad
"National Anthem"	Inquilaab	1996	Salman Ahmad
"Neend Athi Naheen"	Junoon	1991	Sabir Zafar
"Open Your Eyes (Pakistan Humara)"	Door	2016	Salman Ahmad, Peter Gabriel
"Our Land"	Talaash	1993	Salman Ahmad
"Pappu Yaar"	Dewaar	2004	Sabir Zafar, Salman Ahmad
"Pheli Lagan"	Talaash	1993	Salman Ahmad
"Pyar Bina"	Parvaaz	1999	Sabir Zafar, Salman Ahmad
"Rangon Mein Khoya"	Junoon	1991	Sabir Zafar
"Rondé Naina"	Parvaaz	1999	Sabir Zafar, Salman Ahmad
"Rooh Ki Pyas"	Inquilaab	1996	Salman Ahmad
"Saeein"	Inquilaab and Azadi	1996, 1997	Salman Ahmad
"Saeein Alaap"	Azadi	1997	Sabir Zafar, Salman Ahmad
"Sajna"	Parvaaz	1999	Ali Azmat
"Sanwal"	Parvaaz	1999	Sabir Zafar, Salman Ahmad
"Sapnay"	Dewaar	2004	Sabir Zafar, Salman Ahmad
"Sayonee"	Azadi	1997	Sabir Zafar, Salman Ahmad
"Shamein"	Andaz	2001	Sabir Zafar, Salman Ahmad
"Sheena"	Andaz	2001	Sabir Zafar, Salman Ahmad
"Sheeshay Kay Ghar"	Andaz	2001	Sabir Zafar, Salman Ahmad
"Sunn"	Junoon	1991	Salman Ahmad
"Taara Jala"	Dewaar	2004	Ali Azmat, Sabir Zafar
"Talaash"	Talaash	1993	Salman Ahmad
"Time"	Rock & Roll Jihad	2010	Andrew McCord, Salman Ahmad
"Wahda Hoo"	Azadi	1997	Sabir Zafar, Salman Ahmad
"Why?"	Rock & Roll Jihad	2010	Andrew McCord, Salman Ahmad
"Woh"	Talaash	1993	Salman Ahmad
"Yaar Bina"	Azadi	1997	Sabir Zafar, Salman Ahmad
"You Never Give Me Your Love"	Junoon	1991	Salman Ahmad
"Zamane Ke Andaz"	Andaz	2001	Muhammad Iqbal, Sabir Zafar, Salman Ahmad

== Other songs ==
Title	Release	Year	Original composer(s)
"Ehtesaab"	"Kashmakash"	1995	Salman Ahmad
"Piya (Ocean of Love)"	"Daur-e-Junoon"	2003	Morten Harket, Salman Ahmad
"Piyar Hai Zindagi"	"Daur-e-Junoon"	2003	Salman Ahmad
"No More"	"Junoon for Peace"	2001	Salman Ahmad

== Cover versions ==
Title	Release	Year	Original composer(s)
"Allah Hu"	"Millennium 1990-2000"	2000	Nusrat Fateh Ali Khan
"Holy Ground"	"No More"	2002	Morten Harket, Nick Whitecross, Ole Sverre Olsenn (a-ha)
