= List of Junoon members =

Junoon
- Origin: Lahore, Punjab, Pakistan
- Genres: Sufi rock, Alternative rock, Psychedelic rock
- Years active: 1990–present
- Website: www.junoon.com

These are the line-ups of Junoon, a sufi rock band from Lahore, Pakistan, formed in 1990 by songwriter/guitarist Salman Ahmad, former keyboardist Nusrat Hussain, and former vocalist Ali Azmat. Junoon is Southeast Asia's most successful band with more than 30 million sold albums worldwide.

Although Junoon has been prominent in their home country since the release of their first single, "Talaash" (1993) and debut self-titled album Junoon, they did not achieve worldwide fame until the release of the albums Inquilaab, Azadi and Parvaaz, in 1996, 1997 and 1999, respectively. Their 1997 album, Azadi, has sold more than half million copies, and hit platinum sales status in a record four weeks. Their biggest hit single, "Sayonee" (1997), became an instant hit in South Asia and the Middle East, shooting to the top of all the Asian charts, and staying at #1 on both Channel V and MTV Asia for over two months. The band produced an overall two singles and two music videos from the album, the other single being "Yaar Bina".

In 2003, after the release of seventh studio album Dewaar in 2003, bassist Brian O'Connell left the band and returned to his native land United States. Since his departure, Pakistani musician Mekaal Hasan and the band's producer John Alec have been playing bass guitar for live shows in place. Dewaar was the album to have the featured the trio together. In 2005, vocalist Ali Azmat left the band to pursue his career as a solo artist and has released two studio albums to date. Salman Ahmad also went on to pursue his solo career and released his debut solo album, Infiniti in July 2005.

The following is a list of musicians who have been part of Junoon over the years.

== Current members ==
Salman Ahmad

- Active: 1990–present
- Instruments: lead vocals, lead guitar
- Release contributions: Junoon (1991), Talaash (1993), Inquilaab (1996), Azadi (1997), Parvaaz (1999), Andaz (2001), Dewaar (2003)

Salman Ahmad (born December 12, 1963) is a Pakistani singer-songwriter, composer, lead guitarist and actor whose work includes one solo albums, Infiniti, released in 2005. While still enjoying the success of Junoon, he was involved in two documentaries with the BBC and is also a UN Goodwill Ambassador for HIV/AIDS. Ahmad is working towards spreading awareness about HIV in South Asia, and helping to bring peace between Pakistan and India. Ahmad is currently teaching at Queens College, City University of New York. Although Junoon's two other core members, Ali Azmat and Brian O'Connell, left the band in 2005, Salman Ahmad continues to perform as a solo artist under the "Junoon" label and has moved to New York after his solo career failed to take off in Pakistan.

== Former members ==
Nusrat Hussain

- Active: 1990–1998
- Instruments: keyboards
- Release contributions: Junoon (1991) Azadi (1997)

Nusrat Hussain is a Pakistani singer-songwriter, composer and keyboardist. Known best for his composition of the hit song "Dil Dil Pakistan" during his time at the Pakistani pop rock band Vital Signs. When Salman Ahmed, a member of the Vital Signs left the band and went on his separate way, Nusrat joined him to form a new band with Ali Azmat as lead vocalist. After spending some time with Vital Signs and Junoon, Hussain ventured on his own and released a solo album titled Amrit. It was a sincere effort that reflected Nusrat's skills and experience in the music industry. Currently, Nusrat Hussain is a professional pilot and flies the Airbus A310 of Pakistan International Airlines as a Captain (PIA). In 2012, Hussain made a comeback to the Pakistani music industry by releasing a single "Maza Dard Ka".

Ali Azmat

- Active: 1990–2005
- Instruments: lead vocals, rhythm guitar
- Release contributions: Junoon (1991), Talaash (1993), Inquilaab (1996), Azadi (1997), Parvaaz (1999), Andaz (2001), Dewaar (2003)

Ali Azmat (born April 20, 1970) is a Pakistani singer-songwriter, composer, musician and actor whose work includes two solo albums, Social Circus and Klashinfolk, released in 2005 and 2008 respectively. Azmat grew up in Lahore, which he credits for his unconventional attitude. He went to Australia for his higher studies, but due to financial difficulties he returned to Pakistan before completing university. His first band Jupiters was known for performing covers at small gigs, such as weddings, in Lahore. While with them, Azmat wrote his legendary hit song "Dosti". He later sang and recorded "Dosti" with Junoon, after which the song gained national fame. Junoon was Pakistan's biggest band famous for combining traditional poetry and instruments with rock music. Azmat was recruited by Salman Ahmad as the lead vocalist of the band. He left Junoon in 2005 to pursue a solo career.

Brian O'Connell

- Active: 1992–2003, 2011
- Instruments: bass guitar
- Release contributions: Talaash (1993), Inquilaab (1996), Azadi (1997), Parvaaz (1999), Andaz (2001), Dewaar (2003)

Brian O'Connell (born July 20, 1963) is an American bassist, musician and actor. O'Connell and Salman Ahmad, were friends with one another since their high school. Brian O'Connell joined Junoon when keyboardist Nusrat Hussain left the band and Salman Ahmad invited him to play bass on the band's second album, Talaash. He is known for harmonizing the western 5-string bass riffs with the traditional tabla and drums. After the release of the band's seventh studio album, Dewaar, O'Connell returned to the United States. Since his departure, Pakistani musician Mekaal Hasan and the band's producer John Alec have been playing bass guitar for live shows. He was married to Pakistani actress and model Ayeshah Alam. In 2011, O'Connell rejoined the band to celebrate Junoon's 20th anniversary.

== Junoon's Line-up ==
Years	Artist	Albums/songs	Instrument	Contribution
1991–2005	Ali Azmat		Lead Vocalist	Sang on all Junoon albums until, Dewaar
1992–2003, 2011	Brian O'Connell	Performed on all albums from Talaash to Dewaar	Bass guitar	Played bass Talaash-Dewaar
1991	Asad Ahmed	Only live	Bass guitar	Played bass in the 1991 studio album, Junoon
1991	Fuad Abbasi	"Talaash" in Talaash	Drums	Played drums in the 1993 studio album, Talaash
1991	Fifi Haroon	"Jeeain" and "Jogia" in Junoon	Female vocals	Female vocals in the 1991 studio album, Junoon
1999–2001	John "Gumby" Louis Pinto	Only live	Drums	Played drums in the 2001 studio album, Andaz
1996–1999	Malcolm Goveas	Played drums in the 1996 and 1999 studio albums, Inquilaab and Parvaaz	Drums	Played drums in the 1996 and 1999 studio albums, Inquilaab and Parvaaz
2001	Morten Harket	"Piya (Ocean of Love)" in Daur-e-Junoon	Male vocals	Vocals on the track, "Piya (Ocean of Love)"
2003–2005	Mekaal Hasan	Only live	Bass guitar	Live in Playback
2001	Samina Ahmad	"Azadi" in Andaz	Female vocals	Female vocals in the 2001 studio album, Andaz
2003	Ali Noor	"Ghoom Taana" in Dewaar	Male vocals	Vocals on the track, "Ghoom Taana", in the 2003 studio album, Dewaar
2004	Shubha Mudgal	"Ghoom Taana" in Dewaar	Female vocals	Vocals on the track, "Ghoom Taana", in the 2003 studio album, Dewaar
