= Junoon 20 =

junoon 20

Compilation album by Junoon
- Released: September 30, 2011 (Volume I released for digital download on October 5, 2011); December 21, 2011 (Volume I released by EMI Pakistan)
- Recorded: 1991–2011
- Genres: Sufi rock, classical rock, psychedelic rock
- Length: 1:37:25
- Labels: EMI, Nameless Sufi Music
- Producers: John Alec, Salman Ahmad

Junoon chronology
Rock & Roll Jihad (2010)	junoon 20 (2011)	Door (2016)

Singles from Junoon 20
- 1. "Open Your Eyes (Pakistan Humara)" Released: November 2, 2010; 2. "Neend Aati Naheen" Released: September 30, 2011; 3. "Saeein" Released: November 7, 2011

Junoon 20 is the fourth compilation album and the nineteenth album overall of the Pakistani rock band Junoon. It was a tribute album for the 20th anniversary of the band and is divided into two volumes. The first edition of the album featured many well known musicians like Bilal Khan, Outlandish, Aag, Usman Riaz and Laal’s Taimur Rahman, paying tribute to Junoon by covering some of the band's famous songs. The first volume of the album was released on September 30, 2011, and was made digitally available on October 5, 2011.

On December 21, 2011, EMI Pakistan released Junoon's 20th anniversary album volume I in a ceremony held at Marriott Hotel, Karachi, Pakistan.

== Background ==
In August 2010, in an interview with American music magazine The Rolling Stone, Salman Ahmad talked about his novel and the soundtrack album based on the novel. Salman said that in India the book would be accompanied by a free CD which includes two singles, "Love Can You Take Me Back" and "Bulleya/Lonely Heart", and also including two other tracks, "Sayonee" and "Meri Awaz Suno". Salman also said that he was working on a new Junoon album, to be released the following next year. On August 16, in an interview with BBC World Service, Salman stated that he was writing a song named "Khwab" to raise funds for the Pakistan flood victims. He said the song would be internationally released within a few weeks and hoped to record it with Pakistani and Western artists. After a few days, it was confirmed that Salman would collaborate with Peter Gabriel on "Khwab". On August 25, Salman Ahmad spoke to a Dutch TV channel about organizing a charity concert with various artists to raise money for the flood victims in Pakistan. In September, Salman said he had collaborated with Alison Sudol on the song "Pakistan Humara" (first named "Khwab", later named "Open Your Eyes") for the flood victims. He added that Peter Gabriel will be bringing his genius to the song on September 6.

On October 29, Salman Ahmad released the song "Open Your Eyes" with Peter Gabriel and Alison Sudol for the Pakistan flood relief. The song was launched on November 2, to be downloaded from digital music sites globally. Each dollar for download will go to Pakistan flood relief through their charity organisation, Salman and Samina Global Wellness initiative (SSGWI). After the release of "Open Your Eyes", Peter Gabriel offered Salman Ahmad to record a complete album with his Real World Records label next year. Salman Ahmad also confirmed that he's working on a duet with American artist and producer David Sisko who has worked for the likes of Justin Timberlake & Gwen Stefani.

=== Reunion: Junoon's 20th anniversary ===
On January 26, 2011, Junoon performed at Lahore University of Management Sciences for United Nations HIV/AIDS campaign. On March 16, the single "Pakistan Humara" in collaboration with Peter Gabriel was dedicated to the Pakistan cricket team playing at the 2011 Cricket World Cup. On March 18, Junoon performed at The College of William & Mary as part of W&M's Asian studies initiative. On March 23, Junoon launched the music video of the single "Pakistan Humara" directed by Asad Pathan. On June 19, Junoon performed at the Festival Mundial held in Tilburg, Netherlands.

On August 12, in an interview with The Express Tribune Ahmad confirmed that he was set to celebrate Junoon’s 20th anniversary with the band's former bassist Brian O'Connell. “We are reaching Junoon’s 20th anniversary, so I’m excited about more projects coming up regarding that,” Ahmad told The Express Tribune. Ahmad also confirmed that Junoon’s 20th anniversary celebration concert will be held at the Asia Society on September 24 in New York City. The band also announced that it will release an album to mark two decades of Junoon. The album will be featuring Strings, Bilal Khan, Outlandish, Aag, Usman Riaz and Laal’s Taimur Rahman. Shoaib Mansoor will be writing lyrics for the band's anniversary album.

On September 24, Junoon celebrated their 20th Anniversary by performing a concert at the Asia Society & Museum in New York City. It was after 8 years that both Salman Ahmad and Brian O'Connell shared the same stage together to celebrate the band's reunion and anniversary. In response to the 20th Anniversary of the band, former vocalist, Ali Azmat in an interview with Newsweek magazine said that he does not want to associate his name with Junoon as there are some personal issues between Salman Ahmad and him. Azmat also confirmed that Salman Ahmad invited him to be part of the 20th Anniversary reunion concert by he never replied to his emails. On September 30, Junoon performed at the Crowell Concert Hall in Wesleyan University, Middletown, Connecticut, United States and also released the first edition of their 20th Anniversary album, Junoon 20. Tribute singles were released by Junoon on its official Facebook page along with a music video release of "Neend Aati Naheen" covered by Laal. On November 7, Usman Riaz released a music video for the song "Saeein" that featured in the 20th Anniversary album first edition.

== Track listing ==
All music composed by Salman Ahmad.

Junoon 20: Volume I
No.	Title	Writer(s)	Artist(s)	Length
1.	"Open Your Eyes (Pakistan Humara)"	Peter Gabriel, Salman Ahmad	Junoon (feat. Peter Gabriel, A Fine Frenzy & Samina Ahmad)	5:53
2.	"Dil Se Jo Baat"	Allama Iqbal	Junoon	4:05
3.	"Chand Sitara"	Shoaib Mansoor	Junoon	4:20
4.	"Saeein (Instrumental)"		Usman Riaz	4:23
5.	"Ghoom Taana"	Salman Ahmad	Junoon (feat. Shubha Mudgal & Noori)	6:42
6.	"Samina (Instrumental)"		Vital Signs	6:10
7.	"Do Pal Ka Jeevan"	Shoaib Mansoor	Vital Signs	5:22
8.	"Khwab"	Nusrat Hussain, Salman Ahmad	Junoon	5:26
9.	"Talaash"	Salman Ahmad	Junoon	5:09
10.	"No More"	Polar Levine, Isam Bachiri, Lenny Martinez, Waqas Ali Qadri	Outlandish (feat. Ali Azmat)	4:28
11.	"Tum Sung Naina"	Rubina Badar	Samina Ahmad	4:52
12.	"Jogia"	Salman Ahmad	Junoon (feat. Fifi Haroon)	4:53
13.	"Heer (Instrumental)"		Shahjehan Khan	2:54
14.	"Rangon Main Khoya"	Salman Ahmad	Junoon	5:23
15.	"Woh"	Salman Ahmad	Junoon	5:12
16.	"Dil Main Meray"	Bilal Khan	Bilal Khan	2:45
17.	"Mitti"	Sabir Zafar, Salman Ahmad	Aag	5:20
18.	"Neend Aati Naheen"	Salman Ahmad	Laal	4:16
19.	"Dum Mustt Qalandar (Live at Central Park, New York)"		Junoon	5:44
20.	"Bulleya/Lonely Heart"	Bulleh Shah, Salman Ahmad	Junoon	3:58
Total length:				01:37:25

Junoon 20: Volume I (Bonus Tracks)
No.	Title	Writer(s)	Artist(s)	Length
21.	"Azadi"	Ali Azmat, Sabir Zafar, Salman Ahmad	Jaag	4:50
22.	"Chalay Thay Saath"	Ali Azmat, Salman Ahmad	Farhan Saeed	5:02
23.	"Pyar Bina"	Sabir Zafar	Sajid & Zeeshan	5:31
24.	"Sajna"	Ali Azmat	Momina Mustehsan (feat. Moen Jo Daro)	4:00
Total length:				19:23

== Personnel ==
All information is taken from the CD.

Junoon

- Salman Ahmad - vocals, lead guitar
- Brian O'Connell - bass guitars, backing vocals
