= United for Peace =

Video by Junoon
- Released: 2000
- Recorded: 1996–2000
- Genres: Sufi rock, classical rock, psychedelic rock
- Length: 16:41
- Label: Sadaf Stereo
- Producer: Salman Ahmad

Junoon chronology
Andaz (2000)	United for Peace (2000)	Junoon for Peace (2001)

United For Peace is the second video album and the tenth album overall by the Pakistani band Junoon. The album contains four music videos from Junoon's previous albums, which include Azadi, the theme from Jinnah the Movie, Bulleya from Parvaaz, Jazba-e-Junoon from Inquilaab, and Zamane Ke Andaz from Andaz.

== Track listing ==
All music listed below is written and composed by Salman Ahmad, Ali Azmat, and Sabir Zafar, unless stated otherwise.

United for Peace
No.	Title	Writer(s)	Length
1.	"Azadi"		4:56
2.	"Bulleya"	Bulleh Shah	4:45
3.	"Jazba-e-Junoon"		2:45
4.	"Zamane Ke Andaz (Saqi-Nama)"	Allama Iqbal	4:15

== Personnel ==
All information is taken from the CD.

Junoon

- Salman Ahmad - vocals, lead guitar
- Ali Azmat - vocals, backing vocals
- Brian O'Connell - bass guitar, backing vocals

Additional musicians

- Female Vocals on "Azadi" by Samina Ahmad

Production

- Produced by Salman Ahmad
