= Dewaar: The Best of Junoon =

Greatest hits album by Junoon
- Released: April 27, 2004
- Recorded: 2003–2004
- Genres: Sufi rock, classical rock, psychedelic rock
- Length: 94:30
- Label: EMI
- Producers: Jabbar Salman Ahmad, John Alec, Salman Ahmad

Junoon chronology
Dewaar (2003)	Dewaar: The Best of Junoon (2004)	Ghoom Taana (2004)

Professional ratings
Review scores
Source	Rating
ARTISTdirect	4/5 stars

Dewaar: The Best of Junoon is the third compilation album and the fourteenth album overall released by Pakistani rock band, Junoon. The album is produced by Salman Ahmad, the band vocalist and lead guitarist.

"Garaj Baras" was the soundtrack of the Bollywood movie Paap and "Azadi" was the soundtrack of Jinnah the Movie, which was based on the life of Muhammad Ali Jinnah, the founder of Pakistan.

== Track listing ==
All music written and composed by Ali Azmat, Salman Ahmad and Sabir Zafar, those which are not are mentioned below.

Dewaar: The Best of Junoon, Disc 1
No.	Title	Writer(s)	Length
1.	"Garaj Baras"		4:49
2.	"Sayonee"		5:00
3.	"Pappu Yaar"		2:49
4.	"Saeein"		4:49
5.	"No More"		5:05
6.	"Khudi"	Allama Iqbal	4:06
7.	"Piya"	Morten Harket, Salman Ahmad	6:14
8.	"Jazba-e-Junoon"		4:17
9.	"Azadi"		4:29
10.	"Bulleya"	Bulleh Shah	4:49
11.	"Sanwal"		5:09
12.	"Kyun Parishan Ho"		3:52
13.	"Meri Awaz Suno"		5:29
14.	"Zamane Ke Andaz"	Allama Iqbal	4:26
15.	"Ghoom (Radio Edit)"		4:10
16.	"Taara Jala"		6:56

Dewaar: The Best of Junoon, Disc 2
No.	Title	Length
17.	"Dosti (Live at Roskilde Festival, Denmark)"	7:24
18.	"Khwab (Remix)"	4:50
19.	"No More/Sayonee"	10:05

== Personnel ==
All information is taken from the CD.

Junoon

- Salman Ahmad - vocals, lead guitar
- Ali Azmat - vocals, backing vocals
- Brian O'Connell - bass guitar, backing vocals

Additional musicians

- Vocals on "Azadi" by Samina Ahmad
- Vocals on "Piya" by Morten Harket
- Orchestral arrangements by Paul Schwartz

Production

- Produced by Salman Ahmad
- Mastered by Gus Shaw & Brian O'Connell
