= Door (Junoon album) =

Studio album by Junoon
- Released: December 26, 2016
- Recorded: 2009–2016
- Studios: Shahi Hassan Studio, Islamabad, Pakistan and Grandview Studios in New York City, United States
- Genres: Sufi rock, classical rock, psychedelic rock
- Label: Universal Music Group
- Producers: Shahzad Hassan, Salman Ahmad

Junoon chronology
Junoon 20 (2011)	Door (2016)

Singles from Door
- 1. "Love Can You Take Me Back" Released: March 14, 2010; 2. "Open Your Eyes (Pakistan Humara)" Released: November 2, 2010; 3. "Muskilein" Released: September 25, 2014; 4. "Door Bohat Door" Released: December 17, 2016; 5. "Khwab" Released: January 15, 2017

Door (Urdu: دور, lit. 'Far') is the ninth studio album and twentieth overall album by the Pakistani rock band Junoon. It was released on 26 December 2016 by Universal Music in Pakistan and India. It is the second Junoon album led by guitarist and singer Salman Ahmad following Ali Azmat's departure in 2005 and a tribute album following the death of former Vital Signs vocalist Junaid Jamshed in a plane crash on 7 December 2016, to whom "Khwab" and "Door Bohat Door" are dedicated.

Junoon celebrated their 25th anniversary by releasing their eighth studio. The first single from the album "Door Bohat Door" was released on 17 December 2016 and the music video was shot in Gwadar, Balochistan featuring Wasim Akram.

== Background ==
On 26 January 2011, Junoon performed at Lahore University of Management Sciences for the United Nations HIV/AIDS campaign. On 16 March, the single "Pakistan Humara" in collaboration with Peter Gabriel was dedicated to the Pakistan cricket team playing at the 2011 Cricket World Cup. On 18 March, Junoon performed at The College of William & Mary as part of W&M's Asian studies initiative. On 23 March, Junoon launched the music video of the single "Pakistan Humara" directed by Asad Pathan.

On 12 August, in an interview with The Express Tribune Ahmad confirmed that he is set to celebrate Junoon's 20th anniversary with the band's former bassist Brian O'Connell. "We are reaching Junoon's 20th anniversary, so I'm excited about more projects coming up regarding that," Ahmad told The Express Tribune. Ahmad also confirmed that Junoon's 20th anniversary celebration concert will be held at the Asia Society on 24 September in New York. The band also announced that it will release an album to mark two decades of Junoon. The album will be featuring Strings, Farhan Saeed, Bilal Khan, Outlandish, Aag, Usman Riaz, Laal's Taimur Rahman, Momina Mustehsan, and Sajid & Zeeshan. Shoaib Mansoor will be writing lyrics for the band's anniversary album.

On 24 September, Junoon celebrated their 20th anniversary by performing a concert at the Asia Society & Museum in New York City. It was after 8 years that both Salman Ahmad and Brian O'Connell shared the same stage together to celebrate the band's reunion and anniversary. In response to the 20th anniversary of the band, former vocalist, Ali Azmat in an interview with Newsweek Magazine said that he does not want to associate his name with Junoon as there are some personal issues between Salman Ahmad and him. Azmat also confirmed that Salman Ahmad invited him to be part of the 20th anniversary reunion concert but he never replied to his emails. On 30 September, Junoon performed at the Crowell Concert Hall in Wesleyan University, Middletown, Connecticut, United States and also released the first edition of their 20th anniversary album, Junoon 20.

On 21 December, EMI Pakistan released Junoon's 20th anniversary album volume I in a ceremony held at Marriott Hotel, Karachi, Pakistan. On 25 December, Salman Ahmad announced that he will be collaborating with former Vital Signs lead vocalist, Junaid Jamshed to record a 21st-century version of the two famous Pakistani patriotic songs "Dil Dil Pakistan" and "Jazba-e-Junoon". Ahmad also stated that the rehearsal session was captured by Ahmad's son, Imran, with his phone. "The video and the photo contain a true emotion providing a rare glimpse of hope for the new generation. Two days ago, my dear friend and Vital Signs bandmate, Junaid Jamshed and I came together to rehearse after many years. We felt inspired to sing two anthems of our youth; 'Jazba Junoon' and 'Dil Dil Pakistan'."

On 28 April 2012, Junoon travelled on a tour to India performing at Mumbai. On 3 May, Junoon paid tribute to Khwaja Gharib Nawaz by performing an informal concert of Sufi songs in Ajmer Sharif. Followed by performing at BlueFrog in the capital city, New Delhi at a sold-out concert on 10 May. Salman Ahmed, lead vocalist of the band, confirmed, during his tour to India, in an interview that he has collaborated with singer Sunidhi Chauhan recording two songs, "Yaaron" and "Kaise Bolun", for Vicky Kumar's Bollywood movie, Rhythm.

=== Collaborations (2013–2016) ===
Former members of Vital Signs and Junoon collaborated to release a patriotic song, "Naya Pakistan". The song is written by Salman Ahmad and Aania Shah featuring Shahi Hassan on bass, Nusrat Hussain on keyboards and percussions, and vocalist Junaid Jamshed. The song was recorded at Indus Music World Studios and released on 22 February 2013.

Salman Ahmed while talking about his latest project at Asia Talk on BBC said, "For almost a decade, Junaid has always asked me not to bring guitar or to ask him to sing. When you are friends with somebody you always have to transcend differences and I respect Junaid's views. Junaid once told me that his biggest regret was not to be a part of Jazba Junoon's recording. So when we came up with 'Naya Pakistan', I asked him that this is the chance that's not going to come again so finally Junaid accepted the offer with the condition that he will sing only the opening lines with no music at all." and further added "it signifies the metaphor for unity as we have to compromise for unity in hope of Naya Pakistan."

== Reception ==
Blogger Rabia Syed reviewed the album saying, "The reworking of the Junoon songs kept the feeling but approached each song in a new and different way, it made me fall in love with them all over again, the remix open your eyes was very powerful, I keep playing "Khwab" over and over again in my mind after listening to it, I feel it inspires me in a positive and creative manner. There is a new song "Ansoo" which is mystical and haunting and takes you into the state of trance. I feel Salman Ahmad has a healing voice and can take music to a different level, he inspires by moving forward in a new creative way with inspirational\evolved changes from the 90's."
