= Talaash (album) =

Studio album by Junoon
- Released: September 3, 1993
- Recorded: 1992–1993 at Sound on Sound Studios in Karachi, Pakistan
- Genres: Hard rock, classical rock
- Length: 59:16
- Label: EMI
- Producers: Brian O'Connell, Salman Ahmad

Junoon chronology
Junoon (1991)	Talaash (1993)	Kashmakash (1995)

Singles from Talaash
- 1. "Talaash" Released: 1993

Professional ratings
Review scores
Source	Rating
Pakistani Music Channel	4.5/5 stars

Talaash (Urdu: تلاش, lit. 'Search') is the second studio album of the Pakistani sufi rock band Junoon, released on September 3, 1993. The album was their first with bassist Brian O'Connell, who joined the band after Nusrat Hussain departed from the band to pursue his career as a solo artist and released his debut album Amrit in 1992. This was also the first Junoon album produced by Salman Ahmad and O'Connell. Both later released several other albums by Junoon before O'Connell left the band after Dewaar in 2003. The album also served as a soundtrack for the Pakistani television show Talaash, which featured the band and its novel storyline was based on the band.

The only single from the album was "Talaash" which is a socio-political song written by lead guitarist Salman Ahmad. Other popular songs from the album include "Heeray", "Woh" and "Bheegi Yaadein". The instrumental song "Aap Aur Hum" (also known as "Jugalbandi") was covered by American rock band Black Leaf Clover, adding vocals, additional instrumentation, and titling it "Breathe" in 2009.

The album contained a total track list of twelve songs with six tracks being in Urdu language, three tracks in English and three instrumentals. The album was recorded at Sound on Sound Studios in Karachi and was mixed by Tahir Gul Hasan.

== Conception ==
=== Background ===
Junoon were not an over night success, the band members struggled for the first few years. Their self-titled debut album, Junoon, recorded at the EMI Studios in Karachi barely made a dent in the Pakistani music industry when released in January 1991. After the release of their debut album, Nusrat Hussain parted ways with the band to pursue his own career as a solo singer and went on to release his debut solo album Amrit in 1992.

After the departure of Nusrat Hussain, Salman Ahmad contacted Brian O'Connell and invited him to play bass on the band's second album. Brian O'Connell quit his job as a social worker and traveled 10,000 miles to Karachi, Pakistan, where he reunited with his old friend. It was after ten years both the friends reunited.

=== Recording ===
Following the release of the band's debut album, Junoon soon entered the recording studios to work on their sophomore effort a year after the release of Junoon. The band recruited bassist Brian O'Connell who along with lead guitarist Salman Ahmad, previously produced the band's debut album, started to work on the production of the album. While working on Talaash, on the other hand the band also featured in a television series, Talaash, directed by Atiqa Odho and written by Anwar Maqsood, based on the true story of the band in which the band members acted themselves and due to its novel storyline it became an extremely popular television series in Pakistan. The television series were aired on PTV.

The mixing and engineering of the album was done by Tahir Gul Hasan. The album was recorded at Sound on Sound studios in Karachi. All songs on the album were written by Salman Ahmad, which included six songs in Urdu language, three songs in English and three instrumentals. Asad Ahmed, lead guitarist of Awaz back then, played bass guitar on a few tracks and Fuad Abbasi played drums on all songs except "Woh".

== Track listing ==
All music written & composed by Salman Ahmad.

Talaash
No.	Title	Length
1.	"Heeray"	3:54
2.	"Pehli Lagan"	5:15
3.	"Woh"	5:21
4.	"Ghaflat"	6:16
5.	"Lady Magic"	5:16
6.	"Aap Aur Hum (Instrumental)"	4:44
7.	"Talaash"	5:12
8.	"If You Want"	4:58
9.	"Bheegi Yaadein"	6:15
10.	"Our Land"	5:22
11.	"Barzakh (Instrumental)"	5:15
12.	"Himalayan Song (Instrumental)"	1:25
Total length:		59:16

== Personnel ==
All information is taken from the CD.

Junoon

- Ali Azmat - vocals
- Salman Ahmad - lead guitar, backing vocals
- Brian O'Connell - bass guitar, backing vocals
- Nusrat Hussain - keyboard, backing vocals

Additional musicians

- Bass guitars played by Assad Ahmed
- Drums played on all tracks except "Woh" by Fuad Abbasi

Production

- Produced by Brian O'Connell & Salman Ahmad
- Recorded & Mixed at Sound on Sound Studios in Karachi, Pakistan
- Engineered & Mixed by Tahir Gul Hassan

== See also ==
- Talaash (TV series)
- Rock & Roll Jihad: A Muslim Rock Star’s Revolution for Peace
