= Junoon for Peace =

Live album by Junoon
- Released: October 27, 2001
- Recorded: October 27, 2001 at Allience Francaise in New York City, United States
- Genres: Sufi rock, classical rock, psychedelic rock
- Length: 31:54
- Label: Nameless Music
- Producer: Salman Ahmad

Junoon chronology
United for Peace (2001)	Junoon for Peace (2001)	Daur-e-Junoon (2002)

Junoon for Peace is the first live album and the eleventh overall album by the Pakistani band Junoon. The album was recorded live on October 27, 2001.

The concert was a tribute to the victims of the World Trade Center attacks and a call for an end to the subsequent discrimination faced by Arabs and South Asians in United States.

== Background ==
Following the 9/11 attacks, Junoon helped to organise a concert at the United Nations General Assembly on UN Day with Junoon and an Indian group performing at the Assembly Hall, a first of its kind. They also released what they called their first English-language single, "No More", an anti-violence song which deals directly with the events of 9/11. Three days later, Junoon performed live and sang songs from their previous albums and those were included in this live album. The band released this album to pay tribute to the victims of the 9/11 attacks and a call for an end to the discrimination of the Arabs and South Asians by the Americans.

== Track listing ==
All music written & composed by Salman Ahmad, Ali Azmat and Sabir Zafar, those which are not are mentioned below.

Junoon for Peace
No.	Title	Writer(s)	Length
1.	"Bulleya"	Bulleh Shah	5:12
2.	"Dosti"		6:39
3.	"Khudi"	Allama Iqbal	4:19
4.	"Mitti"		5:45
5.	"Sayonee"		5:07

"No More Video"
No.	Title	Length
6.	"No More"	4:52

== Personnel ==
All information is taken from the CD.

Junoon

- Salman Ahmad - vocals, lead guitar
- Ali Azmat - vocals, backing vocals
- Brian O'Connell - bass guitar, backing vocals

Production

- Produced by Salman Ahmad
- Recorded and Mixed at Allience Francaise in New York City, New York, United States
