= Irteassh =

Pakistani all-female a capella band

- Genres: Eastern Classical, Pop Rock
- Years active: 2017-Present
- Members: Eman Pirzada, Ayesha Akbar Waheed, Sajar Nafees and Simal Nafees

Irteassh is an all-girl A cappella band based in Karachi, Pakistan, which appeared in Coke Studio (Pakistani TV program) in Season 10. The band comprises 4 female vocalists Eman Pirzada, Ayesha Akbar Waheed, Sajar Nafees and Simal Nafees. Introduced by Salman Ahmad, Irteassh performed Ghoom Taana with Momina Mustehsan in Coke Studio (Pakistani season 10).

== Early career ==
The four girls were discovered by Salman Ahmed of Junoon during a musical competition and he then took them to Coke Studio. Soon after the show, they formed a band and Ayesha Akbar Waheed came up with the name Irteassh that means wave forms of the voice.
