= Andaz (album) =

Andaz/Ishq

Studio album by Junoon
- Released: March 15, 2001 (re-released on October 16, 2001)
- Recorded: 2000–2001 at Grandview Studios in New York City, United States
- Genres: Sufi rock, classical rock, psychedelic rock
- Length: 59:06
- Labels: EMI, Lips Records
- Producers: John Alec, Salman Ahmad

Junoon chronology
The Videos 1990-2000 (2000)	Andaz/Ishq (2001)	United for Peace (2001)

Alternative cover
- Pakistani Edition Cover. Album titled as "Ishq".

Singles from Andaz
- 1. "Zamane Ke Andaz" Released: 2002

Professional ratings
Review scores
Source	Rating
Allmusic	3.0/5 stars

Ishq (Urdu: عشق, lit. 'Love') is the sixth studio album and the ninth overall album of the Pakistani sufi rock band Junoon. The album was released on January 1, 2001, and was titled Andaz in its release outside Pakistan.

== Background ==
The album topped the charts in Pakistan as well as in the Gulf and South Asia, with its first single entitled "Zamane ke Andaz" (Saqi-Nama) which made it to #1 in the Gulf, and to #5 on the Asian charts. On its official website, Junoon has stated that through this album the band tried to move past the Sufi rock genre.

== Track listing ==
All music written & composed by Salman Ahmad and Sabir Zafar. Except for "Zamane Ke Andaz" (Saqi-Nama) which was written by Allama Iqbal.

Andaz/Ishq
No.	Title	Writer(s)	Length
1.	"Zamane Ke Andaz (Saqi-Nama)"	Allama Iqbal	4:37
2.	"Kaise Gaoun Mein?"		4:45
3.	"Sheeshe Ka Ghar"		4:39
4.	"Sheena"		4:56
5.	"Shamein"		5:02
6.	"Ishq"		4:58
7.	"Jaaney Tu"		5:17
8.	"Chul Kuriye"		3:31
9.	"Chaen"		4:03
10.	"Dharti Keh Khuda"		4:21
11.	"Jugalbandi (Live at Roskilde Festival, Denmark)"		3:07
12.	"Dosti (Live at Roskilde Festival, Denmark)"		7:42
13.	"Azadi (song)|Azadi (feat. Samina Ahmad) [Theme from "Jinnah the Movie"]"		2:21

== Personnel ==
All information is taken from the CD.

Junoon

- Ali Azmat - vocals
- Salman Ahmad - lead guitar, backing vocals
- Brian O'Connell - bass guitar, backing vocals

Additional musicians

- Female vocals on "Azadi" by Samina Ahmad
- Drums played by Jay Dittamo & John "Gumby" Louis Pinto
- Orchestral Arrangements by Paul Schwartz

Production

- Produced by John Alec & Salman Ahmad
- Recorded & Mixed at Grandview Studios in New York City, United States
- Mastered by Scheherazade Qassim Hassan
- Engineered & Mixed John Alec
- Tracks recorded at the Roskilde Festival, produced by Neils Ekner
- Tracks recorded at the Roskilde Festival, recorded & mixed by Ossian Rhyner
