= Ghoom Taana =

Single by Junoon

from the album Dewaar
- Released: August 5, 2004 (Re-released in 2005 and 2016)
- Recorded: 2003 at Grandview Studios in New York City, United States
- Genre: Alternative rock
- Length: 5:34 (album version); 5:33 (remix); 7:40 (video)
- Label: Sadaf Stereo
- Songwriters: Sabir Zafar, Salman Ahmad
- Producer: Salman Ahmad

Junoon singles chronology
| "Garaj Baras" (2004) | "Ghoom Taana" (2004) | "Love Can You Take Me Back" (2010) |

"Ghoom Taana" (Urdu: گھوم تانا transl. Move around) is a song by Pakistani sufi rock band Junoon. It was released as the fifth and final single from their seventh full-length studio album, Dewaar. The single also featured in Salman Ahmad's debut solo album, Infiniti. The song was originally sung jointly by Ali Noor, vocalist of Noori, and Ali Azmat. However, the duet sung with Shubha Mudgal featured only Salman Ahmad for the male vocals. In 2016, a new rendition of the song featured in the band's eighth studio album, Door.

"Ghoom Taana" was named at #10 in a list of Junoon's top 10 songs published by Gibson Guitar on their website.

== Music video ==
The music video for "Ghoom Taana" is a collaboration between Junoon and classical Indian vocalist Shubha Mudgal. The semi-autobiographical video, shot in both India and Pakistan, has been directed by Saqib Malik with cinematography by Sanjay Kapoor. It features a narrative by internationally-acclaimed Indian actor Naseeruddin Shah.

The video is based on the true story of the migration of Salman Ahmed's family from Patiala to Lahore in 1947. The video had been shot partially in the house of Salman's ancestors, Haveli Namdar Khan, in Patiala, and in Lahore.

== Track listing ==
Ghoom Taana

All tracks are written by Junoon.

| No. | Title | Length |
|---|---|---|
| 1. | "Ghoom Taana" | 5:34 |
| 2. | "Ghoom Taana" (Remix) | 5:33 |
| 3. | "Ghoom Taana" (Video) | 7:40 |

== DVD ==
Ghoom Taana

Video by Junoon
- Released: August 8, 2004
- Recorded: 2003–2004 at Grandview Studios in New York City, United States
- Length: 7:40 (music video)
- Label: Sadaf Stereo
- Producers: John Alec, Salman Ahmad

Junoon chronology
| Dewaar: The Best of Junoon (2004) | Ghoom Taana (2004) | Rock & Roll Jihad (2010) |

The music video for "Ghoom Taana" written by Salman Ahmad, is a collaboration between Junoon and classical Indian vocalist, Shubha Mudgal. The semi-autobiographical video, shot in both India and Pakistan, has been directed by Saqib Malik with cinematography by Sanjay Kapoor. It features a narrative by Internationally acclaimed Indian actor Naseeruddin Shah. The song was originally sung jointly by Ali Noor, vocalist of Noori, Ali Azmat and Salman Ahmad and was part of Junoon's seventh studio album, Dewaar. However, the duet sung with Shubha Mudgal featured only Salman for the male vocals.

The video and a special documentary entitled “Building Bridges” was screened at a launch ceremony in Karachi in time for the Independence Day celebrations of Pakistan and India. Based on the true story of Salman's family's migration from Patiala to Lahore in 1947, the video has been shot partially in the former house of Salman's ancestors in Patiala and in Lahore.

Speaking at the occasion, Salman thanked all who helped make his vision a reality in both Pakistan and India. Salman said, “The people of India and Pakistan may have lived apart for 57 years, but their common history spans 5700 years. Thus it is only natural that we overcome our disputes and work together for the benefit of the greater good of the region”. TCS Raghavan, the Deputy High Commissioner for India in Islamabad, was one of the guest speakers at the occasion and said: "Junoon is one of the most popular groups in India today, and their appeal reaches across the country from North to South. We wholeheartedly support Junoon's initiative of grass-roots peace-making through 'Ghoom Taana'." Amin Hashwani, President of Pakistan India CEO's Business Forum said, “We at PICBF are proud to be associated with Salman Ahmad & Junoon's brilliant efforts and hope to continue to support similar ventures whether in business, education, cultural exchange, and the performing arts.”

The song and documentary was launched at the Maurya Sheraton in New Delhi on Tuesday, the 10th of August, by the Confederation of Indian Industry.

=== DVD ===
Released on August 8, 2004, Junoon's "Ghoom Taana" DVD consists of the music video of the song "Ghoom Taana" and a special documentary entitled “Building Bridges” which was screened at a launch ceremony in Karachi in time for the Independence Day celebrations of Pakistan and India.

=== Band line-up ===
- Salman Ahmad - vocals, lead guitar
- Ali Azmat - vocals, backing vocals
- Brian O'Connell - bass guitar

=== Chapter listing ===
1. Ghoom Taana (Video Version) (7:40)
2. Building Bridges Documentary

== Personnel ==
Junoon

- Salman Ahmad - vocals, lead guitar
- Ali Azmat - vocals, backing vocals
- Brian O'Connell - bass guitar

Additional musicians

- Vocals on the original version of "Ghoom Taana" by Ali Noor
- Female Vocals by Shubha Mudgal

== 2017 version ==
Salman Ahmad recomposed the song for CokeStudio10 and he revealed to Samaa TV about this recreation, "Ayesha, Eman, Sajar, and Simal were at a singing competition where I was a judge in January. I picked them out of 25 participants." He then convinced the executive producers of the show, Bilal Maqsood and Faisal Kapadia, to give them a chance and they accepted. On bringing forward the new talent, the four girls called Irteassh, he said, "We just need to give them a platform of arts and culture. They will succeed and show the world that Pakistan is a beautiful and rich country." He changed the old sound of the song to add a cinematic feel. He added that Momina Mustehsan also wanted to join him as she sang earlier with him when they were in New York.
