= Dewaar =

Studio album by Junoon
- Released: December 1, 2003
- Recorded: 2002–2003 at Imaad Studios at Karachi, Pakistan and Grandview Studios in New York City, United States
- Genres: Sufi rock, classical rock, psychedelic rock
- Length: 57:44
- Label: Sadaf Stereo
- Producers: John Alec, Salman Ahmad

Junoon chronology
Daur-e-Junoon (2002)	Dewaar (2003)	Dewaar: The Best of Junoon (2004)

Singles from Dewaar
- 1. "Maza Zindagi Ka" Released: February 2002; 2. "Pappu Yaar" Released: July 2003; 3. "Taraa Jala" Released: October 2003; 4. "Garaj Baras" Released: 2003; 5. "Ghoom Taana" Released: August 8, 2004

Dewaar (Urdu: دیوار, literal English translation: "wall") is the seventh studio album and the thirteenth overall album of the Pakistani band Junoon. Released in 2003, this was the last studio album released by the band after which both vocalist Ali Azmat and bassist Brian O'Connell left the band.

The single "Garaj Baras", from the album, was selected as part of the soundtrack of the 2003 Bollywood movie "Paap" directed by Pooja Bhatt. The song topped the charts again in the country in 2004 and their controversial single "Pappu Yaar" shot to the #1 spot in Pakistan.

== Track listing ==
All music written & composed by Junoon and Sabir Zafar.

Dewaar
No.	Title	Length
1.	"Taara Jala"	7:06
2.	"Pappu Yaar"	2:51
3.	"Ghoom Taana (feat. Ali Noor)"	5:34
4.	"Dewaar"	4:47
5.	"Maza Zindagi Ka"	4:04
6.	"Khwab (Remix)"	4:50
7.	"Garaj Baras [Original Soundtrack from "Paap"]"	4:52
8.	"Baarish"	5:04
9.	"Hungama"	4:18
10.	"Sapnay"	5:47
11.	"Jhulle Lal"	3:36
12.	"Balama"	4:50

== Personnel ==
All information is taken from the CD.

Junoon

- Ali Azmat – vocals
- Salman Ahmad – lead guitar, backing vocals
- Brian O'Connell – bass guitar, backing vocals

Additional musicians

- Drums played by Jay Dittamo & Allan Smith
- Tablas by Ashiq Ali Mir
- Dholak by Muhammad Azam
- Vocals on "Ghoom Taana" by Ali Noor

Production

- Produced by John Alec & Salman Ahmad
- Recorded & mixed at Emad Studios & Grandview Studios
- Engineered & mixed by John Alec and Shehzad Hasan
