= Rock & Roll Jihad =

Soundtrack album by Junoon
- Released: 1 June 2010
- Recorded: 2009–2010 Grandview Studios in New York City, United States
- Genres: Sufi rock, classical rock, psychedelic rock
- Length: 54:44
- Label: Nameless Sufi Music
- Producer: Salman Ahmad

Junoon chronology
Ghoom Taana (2004)	Rock & Roll Jihad (2010)	Junoon 20 (2011)

Singles from Rock & Roll Jihad
- 1. "Love Can You Take Me Back" Released: 14 March 2010

Rock & Roll Jihad is the first soundtrack album and the eighteenth overall album of the Pakistani band Junoon. The soundtrack is based on musical journey of Salman Ahmad and Junoon. The album features five new studio recordings along with five live tracks from "The concert for Pakistan" and the album was officially released on 1 June 2010 under the record label Nameless Sufi Music on all major online stores. Salman, lead guitarist & vocalist, also published a book named, Rock & Roll Jihad: A Muslim Rock Star's Revolution, regarding his time with Junoon and all the struggle he faced to become a rockstar.

On 30 November 2009, Junoon announced that the first single off the album would be the song "Love Can You Take Me Back". On 14 March 2010, Junoon released the video of their first single from the album.

== Track listing ==
All music written & composed by Salman Ahmad and Andrew McCord, those which are not are mentioned below.

Rock & Roll Jihad
No.	Title	Writer(s)	Length
1.	"Allah Hu (Live at The Concert of Pakistan)"		7:29
2.	"Why"		5:00
3.	"National Anthem (Live at The Concert of Pakistan)"		4:01
4.	"Bulleya/Lonely Heart"	Bulleh Shah, Salman Ahmad	3:58
5.	"Dum Mustt Qalandar (Live at The Concert of Pakistan)"		6:53
6.	"Sayonee (Live at The Concert of Pakistan)"	Sabir Zafar, Salman Ahmad	7:38
7.	"Love Can You Take Me Back"		4:33
8.	"Saeein (Live at The Concert of Pakistan)"	Sabir Zafar, Salman Ahmad	5:00
9.	"Time"		4:51
10.	"I Am Because U R"		5:21

== Personnel ==
All information is taken from the CD.

Junoon

- Salman Ahmad - vocals, lead guitar

Additional musicians

- Drums played by Sunny Jain
- Bass guitar played by Chris Tarry & John Alec
- Tablas by Samir Chatterjee
- Dholaks by Didyarka Chatterjee
- Violin by Yale Strom
- Vocals on "Dum Mustt Qalandar" by Waqas Ali Qadri & Sussan Deyhim

Production

- Produced by Salman Ahmad
- Recorded & Mixed at by John Alec & David Cole
- Recorded & Mixed at Grandview Studios, Grandview, New York
- Recording engineering by Josh Kessler
- Photography by Chris Ramirez
