= Jazba-e-Junoon =

Song of the Pakistani band Junoon

Single by Junoon

from the album Inquilaab
- Released: March 1996
- Recorded: 1994
- Genre: Sufi rock Alternative rock
- Length: 4:25 (album version); 3:38 (remix version); 2:45 (single version)
- Label: EMI Pakistan
- Songwriter: Sabir Zafar
- Producer: Salman Ahmad

Junoon singles chronology
"Meri Awaz Suno" (1995)	"Jazba-e-Junoon" (1996)	"Ehtesaab" (1996)

Audio sample
- "Jazba-e-Junoon": file; help

"Jazba-e-Junoon" (Urdu: جذبہ جنوں, literal English translation: "the spirit of passion") is a song by the Pakistani sufi rock band Junoon. It is the thirteenth and final track from the band's third album, Inquilaab (1996), released on EMI Records. Written by Sabir Zafar and guitarist Salman Ahmad, it is the lead single on the album. The song uses blending of rock guitars and bluesy vocals with eastern elements like the use of tablas, raga-inspired melodies and traditional Pakistani folk music.

The unexpected success of "Jazba-e-Junoon" in 1996 propelled Inquilaab at the local music charts, with the song the band started to gain success and began to reach a wider audience. The song was also Junoon's first biggest hit, due to the success of the song Inquilaab became the first hit album by the band. "Jazba-e-Junoon" received many critical plaudits, also becoming the signature song of the 1996 Cricket World Cup. The song was dubbed as a "national song" of Pakistan. The song is one of the most well known and popular tracks by Junoon, listeners and critics alike have continued to praise "Jazba-e-Junoon" as one of the greatest rock songs of all time in Pakistani music industry.

In addition, the remix version of the song featured in the live album Daur-e-Junoon, released in 2002. The song has also featured in several other albums by the band like Kashmakash (1995), Millennium 1990–2000 (2000), United for Peace (2001) and Dewaar: The Best of Junoon (2004).

== Music video ==
The video is of about 2 minutes and 45 seconds. The video featured all three members, Ali Azmat, Salman Ahmad and Brian O'Connell. The video is a tribute to the Pakistan national cricket team, as it shows the cricket team playing a cricket match in a stadium and also shows the band singing in a studio.

== Track listing ==
Jazba-e-Junoon

All tracks are written by Junoon.

No.	Title	Length
1.	"Jazba-e-Junoon"	4:25
2.	"Jazba-e-Junoon" (Remix)	3:38
3.	"Jazba-e-Junoon" (Video)	2:45

== Personnel ==
Junoon

- Ali Azmat - lead vocals, backing vocals
- Salman Ahmad - backing vocals, lead guitar
- Brian O'Connell - bass guitar, backing vocals
