= Daur-e-Junoon =

Live album by Junoon
- Released: March 29, 2002
- Recorded: 1998–2002
- Genres: Sufi rock, classical rock, psychedelic rock
- Length: 71:33
- Labels: EMI (International), Sadaf Stereo and ARY Records (Pakistan)
- Producers: John Alec, Salman Ahmad

Junoon chronology
Junoon for Peace (2001)	Daur-e-Junoon (2002)	Dewaar (2004)

Daur-e-Junoon (Urdu: دورِ جنون, lit. 'The Era of Passion (or Madness)') is the second live album and overall the twelfth album released by the Pakistani rock band, Junoon. The album was released on March 29, 2002.

The album consists of all the major live performances by the band and contains a new version of the 1990s hit, "Jazba-e-Junoon" and also the soundtrack, "Garaj Baras", of the bollywood movie Paap from their forthcoming album "Dewaar" by then. The name of the album came to Junoon's manager, Shehryar Ahmad. He incorrectly translated the English word for tour (as in concert tour, reflecting that it was a live album) as "Daur", connoting Junoon Tour, as "Daur-e-Junoon." (Daura-e-Junoon, sounded more like an epileptic fit, and sounded pejorative)

The album cover concept was also Shehryar's idea. An Indian fan had presented the band with an entire set of a Hindi comic series that he had authored, which featured Ali Salman and Brian as rock Superheroes saving the Earth. Shehryar asked him to draw the album cover, and then had a design agency finalise the cover package.

== Track listing ==
Daur-e-Junoon
No.	Title	Length
1.	"Garaj Baras [Soundtrack of the movie, "Paap"]"	4:48
2.	"Mera Mahi (Live at House of Blues)"	4:58
3.	"Dosti (Live at Roskilde Festival, Denmark)"	7:24
4.	"Khudi (Live at Central Park, New York)"	4:00
5.	"Pyar Bina (Live at United Nations)"	4:11
6.	"Lal Meri Pat (Live at Manhattan, New York)"	6:51
7.	"Sayonee (Live at Central Park, New York)"	5:35
8.	"Dharti Keh Khuda (Live at United Nations)"	4:05
9.	"Saeein (Live at Roskilde Festival, Denmark)"	9:30
10.	"Heeray (Live at Central Park, New York)"	6:12
11.	"Piya (Ocean of Love) (Live at Oslo Spektrum, Norway, feat. Morten Harket)"	6:22
12.	"Pyar Hai Zindagi (feat. Morten Harket)"	3:56
13.	"Jazba-e-Junoon (Remix)"	3:38

== Personnel ==
All information is taken from the CD.

Junoon

- Salman Ahmad - vocals, lead guitar
- Ali Azmat - vocals, backing vocals
- Brian O'Connell - bass guitar, backing vocals

Additional musicians

- Vocals on "Piya" by Morten Harket
- Pyar Hai Zindagi featured Morten Harket

Production

- Produced by Brian O'Connell
- Engineered & Mixed by Brian O'Connell and John Alec
- Tracks recorded at the Roskilde Festival, produced by Neils Ekner
- Tracks recorded at the Roskilde Festival, recorded & mixed by Ossian Rhyner
