= Bulleya =

Single by Junoon

from the album Parvaaz
- Released: 1999
- Recorded: 1999
- Genre: Sufi rock
- Length: 4:52 (album version); 5:55 (reprise); 4:46 (music video)
- Label: EMI, Sadaf Stereo
- Songwriter: Bulleh Shah
- Producer: Salman Ahmad

Junoon singles chronology
"Azadi" (1998)	"Bulleya" (1999)	"Zamane Ke Andaz" (2001)

"Bulleya" (Urdu: بللیہ transl. Oh! Bulleh Shah) is a song by the Pakistani sufi rock band Junoon, released in 1999. It is the first track from the band's fifth album, Parvaaz (1999), recorded at Abbey Road Studios, London and released on EMI Records. The song is a famous kafi written by the sufi saint Bulleh Shah, famous for his spiritual and metaphysical poetry, and Bullah Ki Jaana (the poem on which the song is based) is one of his well-known poems. The song is composed and produced by lead guitarist and founder of the band Salman Ahmad. It is the lead single on the album, and uses blending of rock guitars and bluesy vocals with eastern elements like the use of tablas, raga-inspired melodies and traditional Pakistani folk music.

It is considered one of the best sufi rock songs ever recorded by Junoon, and is often performed at concerts. The song is one of the most popular track by Junoon, also listeners and critics have praised "Bulleya" as one of the greatest rock songs of all time in Pakistani music industry.

A new version, named "Bulleya/Lonely Heart", with addition of English lyrics to the song featured in the soundtrack album Rock & Roll Jihad, was released in 2010. The song has also featured in several other albums by the band like Junoon for Peace (2001), United for Peace (2001) and Dewaar: The Best of Junoon (2004).

== Conception ==
=== Background ===
Bullah Ki Jaana is a Kafi written by the sufi saint Bulleh Shah, who is famous for his spiritual and metaphysical poetry. Bullah Ki Jaana is one of his well-known poems. While reciting Kafis, Bulleh Shah would go on dancing continuously, till he attained the stage of haal (divine ecstasy).

In his poem, Bullah Shah is expressing the relationship between Man and God. Also, Bulleh Shah contemplates the origins of mankind using himself as a metaphor. He expresses doubts about previously held views of the emergence of humans on Earth. He reasons, by referring to himself, that one can never understand the laws of nature and one's place in the Universe.

== Track listing ==
Bulleya

All tracks are written by Junoon.

No.	Title	Length
1.	"Bulleya"	4:52
2.	"Bulleya" (Reprise)	5:55
3.	"Bulleya" (Video)	4:46

== Cover versions ==
- Pakistani rock band Call performed a live session cover of Junoon's hit song "Bulleya" on Indus Music.
- In 2005, Rabbi Shergill's covered a rock/fusion version of the song, which became a chart-topper in India.
- In 2009, Riaz Ali Khan performed a rendition of the song at the Coke Studio Season Two.

== Personnel ==
Junoon

- Salman Ahmad - vocals, lead guitar
- Ali Azmat - vocals, backing vocals
- Brian O'Connell - bass guitar, backing vocals

Additional musicians

- Ustad Aashiq Ali Mir - dholak, tabla

== See also ==
- Bullah Ki Jaana
- Bulleh Shah
- "Bulleya" song in Ae Dil Hai Mushkil
- "Bulleya" song in Sultan (2016 film)
