= Rock & Roll Jihad: A Muslim Rock Star's Revolution =

Book review

- Author: Salman Ahmad
- Language: English
- Subject: Biography
- Genre: Non-fiction
- Publisher: Free Press
- Publication date: January 12, 2010
- Media type: Print (Hardcover)
- Pages: 240 pp
- ISBN: 978-1-4165-9767-4
- OCLC: 472313059

Rock & Roll Jihad: A Muslim Rock Star's Revolution is a book written by musician Salman Ahmad, published on 12 January 2010 by Simon & Schuster.

It is a biography of the author regarding his time with his rock band Junoon and all the struggle he faced to become a rockstar in Pakistan.

On 14 March 2010, Junoon released the video of their first single, "Love Can You Take Me Back", following the soundtrack album release of Rock & Roll Jihad based on the book.

== Synopsis ==
The book begins with a quote from Melissa Etheridge, saying:

The story you are about to read is the story of a light-bringer. Salman Ahmad inspires me to reach always for the greatest heights and never to fear. Know that his story is a part of our history.

The book tells the life story of Pakistan-born Salman Ahmad, who pioneered "Sufi rock" by marrying his teenage love of Led Zeppelin's sinuously behemoth riffs to the ecstatic vocal acrobatics of the millennia-old qawwali style of singing common to Pakistan, fronts Junoon ("passion"), the most revered rock band in all of South Asia for the past two decades. Facing down angry mullahs and oppressive dictators who wanted all music to be banned from the Islamic Republic of Pakistan, Salman Ahmad rocketed to the top of the music charts, bringing Westernstyle rock and pop to Pakistani teenagers for the first time. His band Junoon became the 'U2 of Asia', a Sufi rock group that broke boundaries and sold a record number of albums.

But Ahmad's story began in New York, where he spend his high school years rocking out in Tappan, New York. That dream seemed destined to die when his family returned to Pakistan and Ahmad was forced to follow the strictures of a newly religious. After finishing medical school he devotes his life to peace, love, and power chords as the first true Muslim rock star. "Mine was a sort of Sex Pistols situation in reverse," he writes. "I wanted to unite and heal the divisions in the Third World," not "punch conservative British nationalism and the First World Order in the gut." It didn't hurt that the process included random encounters with Mick Jagger, Bono, and U.N. Secretary-General Kofi Annan, who later named Ahmad UNAIDS Goodwill ambassador.

Today, Ahmad continues to play music and is also a UNAIDS Goodwill Ambassador, traveling the world as a spokesperson and using the lessons he learned as a musical pioneer to help heal the wounds between East and West; lessons he shares in this memoir.
