= Garaj Baras =

2003 single by Junoon

Single by Junoon

from the album Dewaar
- Released: 2003
- Recorded: 2002
- Genre: Hard rock Alternative rock
- Length: 4:52 (album version); 4:48 (video)
- Label: Lips Records
- Songwriters: Ali Azmat, Sabir Zafar
- Producer: Ali Azmat

Junoon singles chronology
"Taara Jala" (2003)	"Garaj Baras" (2003)	"Ghoom Taana" (2004)

"Garaj Baras" (Urdu: گرج برس transl. Thunder and storm) is the seventh track on the 2003 album Dewaar by the sufi rock band Junoon. The song is written by the band's vocalist, Ali Azmat and lyricist, Sabir Zafar. The single was selected as part of a Bollywood movie soundtrack in 2003 for the film Paap directed by Pooja Bhatt. The song topped the charts in both India and Pakistan in 2004.

The single also featured in several other albums of Junoon like Daur-e-Junoon (2002) and Dewaar: The Best of Junoon (2004). Ali Azmat was nominated for "Best Soundtrack" and "Best Song" awards at the Sahara Awards held in London, England, for his single "Garaj Baras" being part of the Indian film Paap. The single was also nominated for the "Best Song" award at the ARY Asian/Bollywood Awards in 2004. The music video release in India of the soundtrack was directed by Tungsten and produced by Music Mushroom/Fish Eye.

On 8 June 2008, Ali Azmat performed a duet of "Garaj Baras" with Rahat Fateh Ali Khan along with singles from his solo albums at the Coke Studio season one's first episode. On 1 July 2011, "Garaj Baras" was named at No. 2 in a list of Junoon's top 10 songs published by Gibson Guitar on their website.

== Music video ==
The music video of "Garaj Baras" starts with a buddhist monk swinging a bucket of water and then the scene focuses on Ali Azmat getting out from a water tub. Afterwards, a few Buddhist monks are seen playing with one another with water. As the video goes on, Ali Azmat is seen standing in a storm while the water droplets are suspended mid-air. Later in the video, Ali Azmat is seen dressed in a monk outfit and multiple scenes are shown of him singing. In the middle of the video, Ali Azmat is seen swinging a bucket of water on fire and a few scenes are shown of him singing the song. As the video proceeds, the Buddhist monks are spilling water all over Ali Azmat and are again shown in a scene when they are playing with water. By the end of the video, Ali Azmat is see in the water tub.

=== Paap ===
The video released, which featured for the Indian movie Paap, was directed by Tungsten and produced by Music Mushroom/Fish Eye in India. The video showed Ali Azmat singing at various shots and various clips from the movie.

=== Coke studio ===
The Coke Studio version video was aired on all major local music channels and also featured Rahat Fateh Ali Khan on vocals. The song was part of the Coke Studio first season musical sessions.

== Track listing ==
Garaj Baras

All tracks are written by Junoon.

No.	Title	Length
1.	"Garaj Baras"	4:52
3.	"Garaj Baras" (Video)	4:48

== Chart positions ==
Chart (2003)	Peak position
Pakistani Singles Chart	1
Indian Singles Chart	1

== Other versions ==
- 2003: "Garaj Baras" soundtrack of Paap
- 2008: "Garaj Baras" Coke Studio version, Ali Azmat duet with Rahat Fateh Ali Khan

== Personnel ==
Junoon

- Ali Azmat – lead vocals, backing vocals
- Salman Ahmad – backing vocals, lead guitar
- Brian O'Connell – bass guitar, backing vocals
