= Sabir Zafar =

Pakistani poet

- Born: 12 September 1949 (age 76); Kahuta, Rawalpindi District, Pakistan
- Occupations: Leading poet and lyricist in Pakistan, wrote songs for many Pakistani films, singers such as Nazia Hasan, Sajjad Ali, Ali Azmat and his band Junoon, as well as many successful TV drama serials
- Writing career
- Language: Urdu
- Notable work: Hai Jazba Junoon Tau Himmat Na Haar written for the 1996 Cricket World Cup - Sung by Junoon band
- Notable awards: Tamgha-e-Imtiaz (Medal of Distinction) by the Government of Pakistan in 2010; PTV Award (Pakistan Television Corporation Award) for 'Best Lyricist' in 2002

Sabir Zafar (born 12 September 1949) is a leading poet and song lyricist in Pakistan.

He has written songs for many Pakistani films, and pop singers, such as Nazia Hasan, Sajjad Ali, Ali Azmat and his band Junoon, as well as many successful TV drama serials.

He was awarded the Tamgha-e-Imtiaz (Medal of Distinction) by the Government of Pakistan in 2010.

== Early life and career ==
Sabir Zafar was born as Muzaffar Ahmed in Kahuta, Rawalpindi District on 12 September 1949 to a school teacher.

Sabir Zafar worked with the Press Information Department of the Government of Sindh. He started writing poetry in 1968. He thinks that he should stay in touch with reality and his poetry should also be based on real-life issues and everyday problems.

Sabir Zafar believes Sufism mellows a person and makes him tolerant of other peoples' views. He told a leading newspaper of Pakistan, when he was asked if it was necessary for a poet to live in a world of fantasies:

"There exists no such world. The only world we have is this real world, or the hereafter. People who live in the world of fantasies, in fact live in a fool's paradise. I am very much in touch with reality and highlight the problems and issues of daily life in my poetry too".

== Songs ==
=== Junoon (band) ===
- "Azadi"
- "Baarish"
- "Chaen"
- "Chalay Thay Saath"
- "Chal Kuriye"
- "Dewaar"
- "Dharti Keh Khuda"
- "Dil Nahin Lag Raha"
- "Dosti"
- "Garaj Baras"
- "Ghoom Taana"
- "Heeray"
- "Hungama"
- "Husan Walo"
- "Ishq",
- "Janey Tu"
- "Jhulle Lal"
- "Kaisay Gaaon Main"
- "Kisne Suna"
- "Kyun Parishan"
- "Lal Meri Pat"
- "Loishay"
- "Mahiwal"
- "Maza Zindagi Ka"
- "Meri Awaaz Suno"
- "Mitti"
- "Mukh Gae"
- "Pappu Yaar"
- "Pyar Bina"
- "Rondé Naina"
- "Saeein Alaap"
- "Sanwal"
- "Sapnay"
- "Sayonee"
- "Shamein"
- "Sheena"
- "Sheeshay Kay Ghar"
- "Taara Jala"
- "Wahda Hoo"
- "Zamane Ke Andaz" (partially)

=== Albums ===
- "Hotline" by Nazia and Zoheb Hassan
- "Love Letter" by Sajjad Ali

=== Television ===
Sabir Zafar has penned the lyrics to the following title songs of many Pakistani television drama serials:

- Man-o-Salwa (2007) broadcast by Hum TV, Sung by Zila Khan
- Wafa Kaisi Kahan Ka Ishq (2009) broadcast by Hum TV, Sung by Zain Ali Khan
- Meri Zaat Zarra-e-Benishan (2010) broadcast by Geo TV, Sung by Rahat Fateh Ali Khan
- Choti Si Kahani (2011) broadcast by Pakistan Television Corporation. Sung by Sara Raza Khan
- Maat (2011) broadcast Hum TV, Sung by Muhammad Ali.
- Kuch Pyar Ka Pagalpan (2011-12) broadcast ARY Digital, Sung by Rahat Fateh Ali Khan.
- Daray Daray Naina (2012) broadcast by A-Plus, Sung by Shreya Ghoshal
- Diyar-e-Dil (2015) broadcast by Hum TV, Sung by Zebunnisa Bangash
- Ek Thi Marium (2016) broadcast by Urdu 1. Sung by Zebunnisa Bangash
- Aatish (2018) broadcast by Hum TV, Sung by Ali Tariq & Bushra
- Balaa (2018) broadcast by ARY Digital, Sung by Faiza Mujahid & Zohaib Hassan
- Cheekh (2019) broadcast by ARY Digital, Sung by Asrar
- Hassad (2019) broadcast by ARY Digital, Sung by Sehar Gul Khan
- Raaz-e-Ulfat (2020) broadcast by GEO TV, Sung by Aima Baig & Shani Arshad
- Hum Kahan Ke Sachay Thay (2021) broadcast by Hum TV, Sung by Yashal Shahid
- Ishq Murshid (2023), broadcast by Hum TV, Sung by Ahmed Jahanzeb

=== Bollywood Films ===
- "Garaj Baras" in Paap (2003), Sung by Ali Azmat

=== Other songs ===
- Hai Jazba Junoon Tau Himmat Na Haar written for the 1996 Cricket World Cup - Sung by Junoon band.

== Books ==
- Lahu Tarang (a collection of folktales of all the four provinces of Pakistan in Urdu language)

== Awards and recognition ==
- Tamgha-e-Imtiaz (Medal of Excellence) in 2010 by the President of Pakistan
- PTV Award (Pakistan Television Corporation Award) in 2002 for Best Lyricist
- MTV (Pakistani TV channel) Music Award in 2009 for Best Lyricist
