= Junoon (Junoon album) =

Studio album by Junoon
- Released: 30 September 1992
- Recorded: 1991 at EMI Studios, Karachi, Pakistan
- Genres: Classical rock, pop rock
- Length: 54:03
- Label: EMI
- Producer: Salman Ahmad

Junoon chronology
| Junoon (1992) | Talaash (1993) |

Singles from Junoon
- 1. "Heer" Released: 1992

Junoon (Urdu: جنون, lit. 'Obsession/Passion') is the debut album of the Pakistani sufi rock band Junoon, released on 30 September 1992. It was released by EMI and recorded at the EMI studios in Karachi in 1990. The album is produced by the band's founder Salman Ahmad. The total track list included twelve songs, eight of them in Urdu language, three in English and one instrumental.

All songs on the album were recorded with Ali Azmat on vocals with the exception of "Khwab" and "Jiyain", which were recorded with Nusrat Hussain on vocals and the track "Jogia" featured female vocals by Fifi Haroon. Session player Asad Ahmed featured on bass guitar, on all tracks in the album.

Junoon's debut album was sponsored by Colgate in promotion of the band and was sold free with every Colgate toothpaste purchase in Pakistan, when released in 1992.

== Conception ==
=== Background ===
Junoon's roots stretch back to Tappan, New York, in the 1970s. Salman Ahmad left Lahore, Pakistan, for New York with his family when he was eleven, and received his baptism in rock music when a friend offered him a ticket to a Led Zeppelin concert. Salman Ahmad was so enthralled by the show that he saved $235 to buy his own electric guitar. He also befriended Brian O'Connell in Tappan, another young aspiring musician, with whom Ahmad formed their first band together by the name of "Eclipse". Before the two friends could take their aspirations out of the basement and onto a bigger stage, Salman Ahmad's parents moved back to Pakistan in 1981, and Salman began to study medicine at Lahore's King Edward's Medical College.

In 1987, Nusrat Hussain, by then the lead guitarist of the band Vital Signs, after composing the song "Dil Dil Pakistan", parted ways with Vital Signs and suggested Rohail Hyatt, founder and keyboardist of Vital Signs, to bring Salman Ahmad as his replacement in the band. Vital Signs then went on to record their debut album at the EMI Studios in Karachi, but almost all the songs were written and composed at Salman Ahmad's residence where the band had been lodged. In March 1989, the band released their debut album, Vital Signs 1, which was a success throughout the country. The following year, Salman Ahmad parted ways with the most successful pop band of Pakistan as he wanted a change in the band's music for their second album and therefore after leaving the band he went on to form his own band. First, he recruited singer Ali Azmat from the Jupiters and then the former Vital Signs lead guitarist, Nusrat Hussain, on keyboards.

Junoon formed in 1990 when Salman Ahmad, founder, songwriter and lead guitarist, had a dream where one of his teachers shook him and said "Tumhey mousiqui ka Junoon hai!" (You have an obsession for music!). After the band's formation, its members were signed to major record label EMI Records and afterwards went on recording their self-titled debut album. The album features the emerging alternative rock instrumentation of the time, as well more palatable hard rock and AOR influences.

== Release and promotion ==
Professional ratings
Review scores
| Source | Rating |
|---|---|
| Pakistani Muziq Channel | 3/5 stars |

Junoon were not an over night success, the band members struggled for the first few years. Their self-titled debut album, recorded at the EMI Studios in Karachi barely made a dent in the Pakistani music industry when released on 30 September 1991. The band's debut album was sponsored by Colgate in promotion of the band and was sold free with every Colgate toothpaste purchase in Pakistan, when released in 1991. After the release of their debut album, Nusrat Hussain parted ways with the band to pursue his own career as a solo singer and went on to release his debut solo album Amrit in 1992.

Singles that performed well at the local music charts were "Neend Athi Nahin", "Jiyain" and "Chori Chori". Although a few singles from the album did pretty well at the local music charts, however, the album failed to make an impact in the Pakistani music industry. Pakistani Muziq Channel gave the album a 3.0/5.0 rating upon its release.

== Track listing ==
All music written & composed by Salman Ahmad.

Junoon
| No. | Title | Length |
|---|---|---|
| 1. | "Chori Chori" | 3:48 |
| 2. | "Neend Athi Nahin" | 4:35 |
| 3. | "Jiyain (feat. Fifi Haroon)" | 5:27 |
| 4. | "Jogia (feat. Fifi Haroon)" | 4:53 |
| 5. | "Heer (Instrumental)" | 4:49 |
| 6. | "Khwab" | 5:27 |
| 7. | "Meré Pass Aaja" | 4:10 |
| 8. | "Rangon Main Khoya" | 5:09 |
| 9. | "You Never Give Me Your Love" | 4:06 |
| 10. | "Game of Chance" | 3:33 |
| 11. | "Sunn" | 4:13 |
| 12. | "Downtown Princess" | 4:00 |
| Total length: | | 54:03 |

== Personnel ==
All information is taken from the CD.

Junoon

- Ali Azmat – vocals
- Salman Ahmad – lead guitar, backing vocals
- Nusrat Hussain – keyboard, backing vocals

Additional musicians

- Asad Ahmed – bass guitars
- Female vocals on "Jiyain", "Jogia" by Fifi Haroon

Production

- Produced by Salman Ahmad
- Recorded & Mixed at EMI Studios in Karachi, Pakistan
