= Parvaaz =

Studio album by Junoon
- Released: June 7, 1999 (re-released on February 5, 2002)
- Recorded: March–April 1999 at Abbey Road Studios in London, United Kingdom
- Genre: Sufi rock
- Length: 50:55
- Labels: EMI, Lips Records
- Producers: Brian O'Connell, John Alec, Salman Ahmad

Junoon chronology
Dosti (1998)	Parvaaz (1999)	Millennium 1990–2000 (2000)

Alternate cover

Singles from Parvaaz
- 1. "Bulleya" Released: 1999; 2. "Sajna" Released: 1999

Professional ratings
Review scores
Source	Rating
Allmusic	4.5/5 stars
ARTISTdirect	4.5/5 stars

Parvaaz (Urdu: پرواز, lit. 'Flight') is the fifth studio album and sixth overall album by the Pakistani sufi rock band Junoon. It was released in 1999 and features songs mostly based on the poetry of the great Punjabi Sufi poet Bulleh Shah.

== Background ==
The album was recorded and mixed at Abbey Road Studios in London and was hailed by critics as Junoon's finest work to date and was released by EMI and Lips Records. Singles like "Bulleya", "Sajna", "Ghoom" and "Mitti" were a success and did well at the music charts. UNESCO presented Junoon with an award for their achievements towards Peace in South Asia. Junoon was invited to perform at UNESCO's "Music for Peace" concert held in Paris, along with Yesudas, Lionel Richie, Montserrat Caballe, Zubin Mehta and many other great artists from around the world. In London, BBC presented Junoon an award for their contribution towards Asian Culture.

== Track listing ==
All songs composed by Salman Ahmad, except track 6, composed by Ali Azmat.

Parvaaz
No.	Title	Length
1.	"Bulleya"	4:52
2.	"Pyar Bina"	4:21
3.	"Sanwal"	5:12
4.	"Mitti"	5:17
5.	"Ghoom"	7:46
6.	"Sajna"	3:54
7.	"Rondé Naina"	5:01
8.	"Ab to Jaag"	4:27
9.	"Aleph"	4:05
10.	"Bulleya (Reprise)"	5:55

"Bulleya VCD"
No.	Title	Length
1.	"Bulleya" (Video)	4:46

== Personnel ==
Junoon

- Ali Azmat – vocals
- Salman Ahmad – lead guitar, backing vocals
- Brian O'Connell – bass guitar, backing vocals
- Mekaal Hasan – keyboard, bass guitar

Additional musicians

- Malcolm Goveas – drums
- Ashiq Ali Mir – tabla, dholak

=== Production ===
- Produced by Brian O'Connell, John Alec & Salman Ahmad
- Recorded & Mixed at Abbey Road Studios in London, United Kingdom
- Mastered by Nick Webb
- Engineered & Mixed by John Alec

=== Album Art ===
- The Album Art was done by Aamir Shah
