= Jay Dittamo =

American drummer

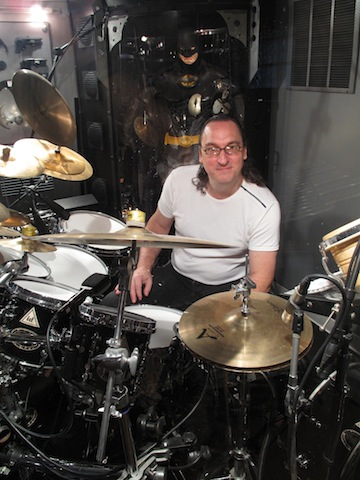
- Dittamo in 2008

Jay Dittamo (born May 30, 1959) is an American drummer, percussionist, music composer and record producer. He has played with acts such as Junoon, Banned From Utopia, Willie Colón, Jimmy Webb, Chuck Berry, The Duprees, The Crests, The Marvellets, Bucky Pizzarelli, and Gloria Lynne He has performed at the Rock and Roll Hall of Fame, the United Nations and for the 2010 New Jersey Hall of Fame as well as played on TV and movie soundtracks. Dittamo also owns The Cave Studio. Dittamo composed, played, and produced a musical score for the classic 1931 Frankenstein movie. He resides in Waldwick, New Jersey.
