= Islamabad: Rock City =

2001 short film by Sameer Butt, Lucas Traub

- Directed by: Sameer Butt, Lucas Traub
- Written by: Sameer Butt; Richard Murphy
- Produced by: Brad Abramson; Sameer Butt; Richard Murphy; Lucas Traub
- Starring: Junoon
- Narrated by: Susan Sarandon
- Edited by: Douglas Anderson
- Music by: Jennifer Stilson; Sandy Alouete; Bruce Gillmer
- Distributed by: VH1
- Release date: November 29, 2001 (U.S.)
- Running time: 20 minutes
- Countries: United States; Pakistan
- Language: English

Islamabad: Rock City is a 2001 documentary film produced by Michael Hirschorn and Shelly Tatro. The film follows the journey of the South Asian rock music band Junoon and the struggle they faced in becoming a successful band.

== Synopsis ==
The VH1 News special is the story of a very unlikely Pakistani rock band who have managed to defy politics, culture and fundamentalism all in the name of music. Translated, "Junoon" means "passion" - and that's what this 10- year-old rock group has brought to a Pakistani music scene that has often been forced underground. The group has been banned for nearly half of its existence, yet has still sold millions of records. Two years ago, it won Channel V award in Delhi for "Best International Group", beating out the likes of Backstreet Boys and The Prodigy.
