= Sayonee =

"Sayonee سیونی"

Single by Junoon

from the album Azadi
- Language: Urdu
- Released: April, 1997
- Recorded: 1997
- Genre: Sufi rock
- Length: 5:05 (album version); 4:58 (music video)
- Label: EMI Pakistan, Universal Music, Sadaf Stereo
- Songwriters: Sabir Zafar, Salman Ahmad
- Producers: John Alec, Salman Ahmad

Junoon singles chronology
"Saeein" (1997)	"Sayonee سیونی" (1997)	"Yaar Bina" (1997)

Sayonee (Urdu: سیونی transl. Soulmate) is a song by the Pakistani sufi rock band Junoon, released in April 1997. It is the first track from the band's fourth album, Azadi (1997), released on EMI Records. Written by lead guitarist and founder of the band Salman Ahmad and writer Sabir Zafar, it is the lead single on the album. The song blends rock guitars and bluesy vocals with traditional musical elements like the tabla percussion drums, Hindustani raga-inspired melodies styled and blended into Pakistani folk music.

The unexpected success of "Sayonee" in 1997 propelled Azadi at the local and international music charts, within three months of the release of Azadi, the album had sold over half a million copies and hit platinum sales status in a record of four weeks. The music video of the single, "Sayonee", was shot by Asim Reza which became an instant hit in South Asia and the Middle East, shooting to the top of all the Asian charts, and staying at #1 on both Channel V and MTV Asia for over two months. The single was a hit in South Asia, topping all music charts in Pakistan, India and Bangladesh. The success of the single led the album being the band's highest selling album in South Asia and Junoon received a platinum certification for hitting platinum sales for their album. Also, the single was nominated for the 'Best International Song' at the Channel V Music Awards in 1998. Junoon won the 'Best International Group' title at the Channel V Music Awards, where they performed along with world-wide icons Sting, The Prodigy and Def Leppard. Azadi was nominated for 'Best International Album', having achieved the prestigious honour of being the highest selling album in Pakistan, Bangladesh and India that year.

To this day, it is considered one of the best sufi rock songs ever recorded, and is often performed at concerts by Junoon. The song is one of the most well known and popular track by Junoon, also listeners and critics have continued to praise "Sayonee" as one of the greatest rock songs of all time in Pakistani music industry. Also, "Sayonee" was named at #1 in a list of Junoon's top 10 songs published by Gibson Guitar on their website.

In addition, the live version performed at Central Park, New York City, in 1998 of the song featured in the live album Daur-e-Junoon, released in 2002. The song has also featured in several other albums by the band like Junoon for Peace (2001) and Dewaar: The Best of Junoon (2004).

A 2021 recreation of the song, featured in a film of the same name starring debutantes Tanmay Ssingh and Muskaan Sethi and directed by Nitin Kumar Gupta, featured vocals by Arijit Singh and Jyoti Nooran and was composed by Joy-Anjan, with additional lyrics by Alaukik Rahi.

== Music video ==
The music video of "Sayonee", literal English meaning "Soulmate", was directed by Asim Reza, and was shot entirely in the Pakistani city of Multan. The plot of the music video rotates around a boy who struggles to find his soul mate and goes through many troubles in life. Furthermore, as the music video proceeds the boy is shown all grown up but still struggling to find his soulmate and thus, is shown running in order to try to save himself from the troubles he has been into. The music video also showed the band performing the song wearing traditional sufi clothing and in between the music video short clips of traditional sufi dancers were seen performing sufi dance.

== Track listing ==
Sayonee

All tracks are written by Junoon.

No.	Title	Length
1.	"Sayonee"	5:05
2.	"Sayonee" (Video)	4:58

== Personnel ==
Junoon

- Salman Ahmad - vocals, lead guitar
- Ali Azmat - vocals, backing vocals
- Brian O'Connell - bass guitar, backing vocals
- Nusrat Hussain - keyboard, backing vocals

Additional musicians

- Ustad Aashiq Ali - Tambourine, Tabla
