= Paap =

2003 film by Pooja Bhatt

- Poster
- Directed by: Pooja Bhatt
- Written by: Mahesh Bhatt
- Dialogues by: Niranjan Iyengar
- Produced by: Pooja Bhatt; Sujit Kumar Singh
- Starring: John Abraham; Udita Goswami; Gulshan Grover
- Cinematography: Anshuman Mahaley
- Edited by: Akiv Ali
- Music by: Anu Malik; Shahzad Hasan; Ali Azmat; Rohail Hyatt; Music Mushrooms
- Production companies: Fish Eye Network; Shreya Creations
- Release dates: 20 December 2003 (Karachi); 30 January 2004 (India)
- Running time: 115 minutes
- Country: India
- Language: Hindi

Paap (transl. Sin) is a 2003 Indian Hindi-language crime thriller film directed by Pooja Bhatt in her directorial debut. The film stars John Abraham, Udita Goswami, Gulshan Grover and Mohan Agashe. The film received mixed reviews from critics, who praised the cinematography, and direction, but criticised the screenplay. The film is remembered for its soundtrack and also marked the Bollywood debut of singer Rahat Fateh Ali Khan with "Mann Ki Lagan".

The film was inspired by the 1985 American film Witness.

== Plot ==
The story is about a young girl, Kaaya, living in the valley of Spiti, waiting to join a Buddhist monastery—an idea that has been fed to her since childhood by her father and one that she has never questioned. When Lama Norbu, a senior lama from the monastery, has a dream that the Buddhist teacher Rinpoche has been reborn, he sends Kaaya to Delhi to bring him back to the monastery. Kaaya goes to Delhi and manages to get the child, but just when they are about to return home, the child witnesses the murder of a police officer in a hotel. The investigations are taken over by another police officer, Shiven, who prohibits Kaaya and the young boy from returning home. During this time, the boy identifies Raj Mehra as the murderer. Soon Shiven finds himself in a web of intrigue and deceit where he can trust no one. He is forced to escape to Spiti along with Kaaya and the young boy, whom he is now determined to protect. Shiven has, however, seriously been injured, and upon reaching Spiti, he has to undergo treatment at Kaaya's home.

While nursing him back to health, Kaaya is attracted to Shiven, an exciting feeling she has never experienced before. Shiven too finds himself drawn to Kaaya, a girl unlike any he has ever known. Kaaya is caught in a dilemma, for she has too long subdued her basic instincts and desires in her search for the 'ultimate truth.' A sexual attraction is one that her conditioned mind sees as a sin, but one she cannot deny. Shiven sees this dilemma and tries to show Kaaya that there is a life out there for which she has a full right to live. In the meantime, Kaaya's father finds out about what has been going on under his roof and is furious with Shiven. He sees Shiven as a polluting influence upon his peaceful life, a man who has brought defiling things like pistols into their home. At this juncture, Shiven's past catches up with them, and Mehra's men are close on his heels.

After much chaos, finally, Shiven and Kaaya are shown reuniting in a passionate embrace.

== Cast ==
- John Abraham as Inspector Shiven
- Udita Goswami as Kaaya
- Gulshan Grover as CP Raj Mehra
- Mohan Agashe as Kaaya's father
- Bikramjeet Kanwarpal as Ratan Singh
- Denzil Smith as Lama Norbu
- Sandeep Mehta as DCP Sushil Mathur
- Anahita Uberoias Anna
- Madan Bhiku as Llahmo, the reincarnated boy
- Ahsan Baksh as Zakir
- Vikram Kapadia as Anna's husband
- Aishwarya Mehta as Niloufer, Zakir's wife
- Netaji as Lama Dorje
- Ritika Luthria as DCP's wife
- Megha Burman as DCP's daughter

== Release ==
The film became the first Hindi film to be premiered at Karachi International Film Festival (KARA) on 20 December 2003. It was theatrically released on 30 January 2004.

== Music ==
Paap

Soundtrack album by Shahi, Anu Malik, Music Mashrooms
- Released: December 2003
- Genres: Feature film soundtrack, Filmi music
- Length: 63:14
- Language: Hindi
- Label: Saregama
- Producers: Shemaroo Entertainment; Pooja Bhatt

The film's music was composed by Anu Malik, Shahi Hasan, and Ali Azmat, with several instrumental tracks by Music Mashrooms. The soundtrack featured a mix of instrumental pieces and songs, notably the hit tracks "Garaj Baras" sung by Ali Azmat, lead vocalist of the Pakistani rock band Junoon and "Laagi Tumse Mann Ki Lagan" sung by Pakistani Sufi singer Rahat Fateh Ali Khan. The latter was a composition by Nusrat Fateh Ali Khan that was originally recorded in Pakistan for an unreleased album and marked Rahat's debut as a Bollywood playback singer. The songs have been written by Sayeed Quadri, Sabir Zafar, Ali Azmat, Amjad Aslam Amjad. Anuradha Paudwal was nominated for Producers Guild Film Award for Best Female Playback Singer for the song "Intezaar."

=== Track listing ===
No.	Title	Music	Artist(s)	Length
1.	"Intezaar"	Anu Malik	Anuradha Paudwal	7:52
2.	"Mann Ki Lagan"	Shahzad Hasan Rohail Hyatt	Rahat Fateh Ali Khan	4:51
3.	"Garaj Baras"	Ali Azmat	Ali Azmat	4:51
4.	"Laal (Alaap)"	Shahzad Hasan Rohail Hyatt	Farrukh Fateh Ali Khan, Rahat Fateh Ali Khan	5:30
5.	"Sun E Mera Dil"	Anu Malik	Anuradha Paudwal, Udit Narayan	7:30
6.	"Witness to a Murder"	Music Mashrooms	Instrumental	3:30
7.	"Shiven Gets Shot"	Music Mashrooms	Instrumental	3:49
8.	"Aaj Ki Raat Kat Gayi Toh"	Music Mashrooms	Instrumental	3:06
9.	"Intezaar Interlude"	Music Mashrooms	Instrumental	0:59
10.	"Apna Sa Kuch Dena Chahti Hoon"	Music Mashrooms	Instrumental	2:12
11.	"Apne Chahato Pe Kaboo"	Music Mashrooms	Instrumental	3:33
12.	"Hamesha Ke Liye Kucch Nahin Rehta"	Music Mashrooms	Instrumental	1:02
13.	"Tumhari Jagah Oonchay Aasman Mein Hai"	Music Mashrooms	Instrumental	2:32
14.	"Tasveer Kheecha To"	Music Mashrooms	Instrumental	0:56
15.	"Zindapal"	Music Mashrooms	Instrumental	3:49
16.	"Kis Kis Ko Maro Ge"	Music Mashrooms	Instrumental	7:12
Total length:				63:14

== Reception ==
=== Critical response ===
The film received mixed reviews. Sukanya Verma of Rediff.com wrote "Frankly, I had expected something more hard-hitting from this articulate actress turned filmmaker. Although Bhatt maintains an intense mood throughout, Paap isn't sinful enough." Taran Adarsh of Bollywood Hungama gave the film 2.5 stars out of 5, writing "On the whole, Paap satiates the appetite of the urban audience looking for a story-based fare. At the box-office, the film should find patronage at multiplexes of metros mainly. For those looking for typical Bollywood masala fare, Paap has very little to offer. Also, lack of aggressive promotion may curtail its business to an extent!." Manish Gajjar of BBC.com wrote "On the whole Paap is different from the regular Bollywood pot boilers. Its different, it's daring but, definitely not sinful."

== Awards and nominations ==
=== Won ===
- 2005: Stardust Superstar of Tomorrow - Male – John Abraham

=== Nominations ===
- Zee Cine Award Best Lyricist for The Song "Intezaar".
- Zee Cine Award Best Debuting Director Pooja Bhatt
- Zee Cine Award Best Newcomer Udita Goswami
