= Brian O'Connell (musician) =

Background information
- Born: Brian O'Connell; 20 July 1963 (age 63); Queens, New York City
- Genres: Hard rock; Sufi rock; blues rock; folk rock; instrumental rock; alternative rock
- Occupations: Musician; actor; record producer
- Instruments: Bass; vocals; guitar; recorder
- Years active: 1992–present
- Labels: EMI; Sadaf Stereo; Lips Records
- Website: www.junoon.com

Brian O'Connell is an American musician, record producer, and actor, best known for being the bassist and producer for the Pakistani Sufi rock band Junoon.

O'Connell joined Junoon at the request of guitarist Salman Ahmad, following keyboardist Nusrat Hussain's departure from the band. Following the release of the band's seventh studio album, Dewaar, O'Connell moved back to the United States, although he remains a member of Junoon.

== Biography ==
=== Early years ===
In 1978, O'Connell, then a sophomore at Tappan Zee High School, was invited by two classmates, Paul Siegel and Mike Langer, to join their band "Apple Corps", a group that played primarily Beatles covers. Shortly after O'Connell joined the band, Apple Corps changed its name to "Sloke", and modified its repertoire to include songs by Led Zeppelin, Boston, and the Grateful Dead. In early 1979, Sloke invited Salman Ahmad to join the group. Following the departure of Sloke's bassist, O'Connell and Ahmad formed a new band, "Eclipse", which disbanded shortly after Ahmad moved back to Pakistan in 1981.

=== Junoon (1992-2003) ===
Following the release of Junoon's self-titled debut album and subsequent departure of keyboardist Nusrat Hussain, Ahmad invited O'Connell to play bass on the band's second album. O'Connell quit his job as a social worker and moved to Pakistan, where he remained following the release of the album. While working on their second album, the band notably starred in a television series, Talaash.

O'Connell continued to play for Junoon until their seventh studio album, Dewaar, when he left the band to move back to the United States.

=== Junoon 20th anniversary (2011) ===
On August 12, in an interview with The Express Tribune, Salman Ahmad stated that he was set to celebrate Junoon's 20th anniversary with the band's former bassist Brian O'Connell. “We are reaching Junoon’s 20th anniversary, so I’m excited about more projects coming up regarding that,” Ahmad said. He stated that Junoon's 20th anniversary celebration concert will be held at the Asia Society on September 24 in New York City. The band announced that it will release an album to mark two decades of Junoon. The album will be featuring Strings, Bilal Khan, Aag, Outlandish, Usman Riaz and Laal’s Taimur Rahman. Shoaib Mansoor will be writing lyrics for the band's anniversary album.

== Discography ==
=== With Junoon ===
- Talaash (1993)
- Kashmakash (1995)
- Inquilaab (1996)
- Azadi (1997)
- Parvaaz (1999)
- Millennium 1990-2000 (2000)
- Andaz (2001)
- Daur-e-Junoon (2002)
- Junoon for Peace (2002)
- Dewaar (2003)
- Dewaar: The Best of Junoon (2004)
- Junoon 20 (2011)

== Filmography ==
- Talaash (1992)
- United for Peace (2001)
- Islamabad: Rock City (2001)
