= Junoon (band) =

Pakistani Sufi-rock band (1990– )

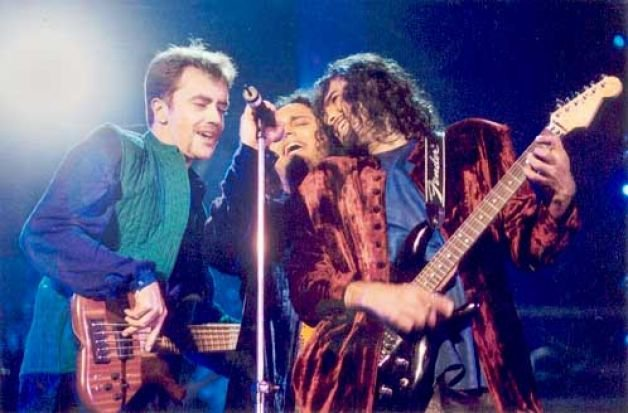
- Junoon performing live at a concert. Visible from left to right are; Brian O'Connell, Ali Azmat and Salman Ahmad.

Background information
- Origin: Lahore, Punjab, Pakistan
- Genres: Sufi rock, psychedelic rock, hard rock, heavy metal
- Years active: 1990–present
- Labels: Sadaf Stereo, EMI Records, Lips Music, Universal Music
- Members: Salman Ahmad; Ali Azmat; Brian O'Connell
- Past members: Nusrat Hussain

Junoon (Urdu: جنون transl. Obsession/Passion) is a Pakistani sufi rock band from Lahore, Punjab, Pakistan, and Tappan, New York, formed in 1990.

The band is directed by founder, lead guitarist and songwriter, Salman Ahmad, who was soon joined by keyboardist Nusrat Hussain, bass guitarist Brian O'Connell and vocalist Ali Azmat. Junoon is Pakistan's most successful bands. Since their inception, the group has released a total of nineteen albums: seven studio albums; one soundtrack; two live albums; four video albums; and five compilations. They have sold over 30 million records worldwide.

Pioneers of Sufi rock with an original sound, they achieved success during the early 1990s. Its members were signed to major record label EMI Records and afterwards released their self-titled debut album Junoon in 1991. After two years, the band recorded their second album Talaash (1993) with their new bassist Brian O'Connell after Nusrat Hussain left the band. The release of their second album began to create a cult following for the band. In 1996, Junoon released their third album Inquilaab, and it was only then that Junoon developed a nationwide fan following, with blending rock guitars and bluesy vocals with Eastern elements like the use of tablas, raga-inspired melodies, traditional Pakistani folk music, and Eastern-inspired poetry. The following year, the band recorded the critically acclaimed Azadi (1997), being the band's first international record deal, and making it Junoon's debut album in neighbouring India. The band went on to record and release Parvaaz in 1999. The band found renewed success and popularity starting with 2001's Andaz and through 2003's Dewaar and their supporting tours. Junoon celebrated their 25th anniversary by releasing their eighth studio album titled Door in 2016.

== History ==
=== Early years (1980–1989) ===
Junoon's origins can be traced to Tappan, New York, where Salman Ahmad lived after moving from Lahore with his family at the age of eleven. He became interested in rock music after attending a Led Zeppelin concert. Salman Ahmad was so enthralled by the show that he saved $235 to buy his own electric guitar. He also befriended Brian O'Connell in Tappan, another young aspiring musician, with whom Ahmad formed their first band together by the name of "Eclipse". Salman Ahmad's parents moved back to Pakistan in 1981, and Salman began to study medicine at Lahore's King Edward Medical College.

In 1987, Nusrat Hussain, by then the lead guitarist of the band Vital Signs, after composing the song "Dil Dil Pakistan" parted ways with Vital Signs and suggested to Rohail Hyatt, founder and keyboardist of Vital Signs, to bring Salman Ahmad as his replacement in the band. Vital Signs then went on to record their debut album at the EMI Studios in Karachi, but almost all the songs were written and composed at Salman Ahmad's residence where the band had been lodged. In March 1989, the band released their debut album, Vital Signs 1, which was a success throughout the country. The following year, Salman Ahmad parted ways with the most successful pop band of Pakistan as he wanted a change in the band's music for their second album and therefore after leaving the band he went on to form his own band.

=== Formation (1990–1993) ===
Junoon, during its early days, rehearsing before a concert. Visible from left to right are; Ustad Ashiq Ali Mir and Salman Ahmad.

Junoon formed in 1990 when Salman Ahmad, founder, songwriter and lead guitarist, had a dream where one of his teachers shook him and said "Tumhey mousiqui ka Junoon hai!" (You have an obsession for music!). Salman Ahmed recruited singer Ali Azmat from the Jupiters and then the former Vital Signs lead guitarist, Nusrat Hussain, on keyboards for Their self-titled debut album, Junoon. The music was recorded at the EMI Studios in Karachi and released in September 1991. Junoon did not achieve immediate success with their first album and barely made a dent in the Pakistani music industry. After the release of their debut album, Nusrat Hussain parted ways with the band to pursue his own career as a solo singer and went on to release his debut solo album Amrit in 1992.

After the departure of Nusrat Hussain, Salman Ahmad contacted Brian O'Connell and invited him to play bass on the band's second album. Brian O'Connell quit his job as a social worker and travelled 10,000 miles to Karachi, Pakistan, where he reunited with his old friend. It was after ten years both the friends reunited. In 1992, the band started working on their second studio album. The album was recorded and mixed at Tahir Gul Hasan's Sound on Sound recording studios in Karachi. While working on their second album at one side, on the other hand the band also featured in a television series, Talaash, directed by Atiqa Odho and written by Anwar Maqsood, based on the true story of the band in which the band members acted themselves and due to its novel storyline it became an extremely popular television series in Pakistan.

On 23 September 1993, Junoon released their second album Talaash. Singles from the album, such as "Talaash", were politically influenced and became subject to censorship, which led to the eventual ban.

=== Rise to fame (1994–1997) ===
In 1994, Junoon started working on their third studio album. In 1995, the band released their first compilation album, Kashmakash, which is the first such compilation album by a band in Pakistan. 1995 was also the year that Junoon's manager, Shehryar Ahmad, set up Junoon's website, www.junoon.com, which was the first ever website of any Pakistani music group. That year Junoon were courted for the controversial video release of the single "Ehtesaab", from Kashmakash, which included footage of a polo pony eating in a posh restaurant. Many thought that the image was an indictment of the corrupt Pakistani political elite, and especially of former Prime Minister Benazir Bhutto. The government quickly responded to it and banned the song and video from the state television. In 1996, the band released their third studio album, Inquilaab, which was recorded and engineered with a completely new sound at Aamir Hasan Studios, Inquilaab was a blend of western music with classical eastern Sufi music. It was the release of their third album when Junoon started to gain success and began to reach a wider audience when one of their singles, "Jazba-e-Junoon", became the signature song of the Cricket World Cup.

Junoon's fourth studio album, Azadi, hit platinum sales for which the band received a platinum certification. The album was a huge success in South Asia, being Junoon's highest selling album

.

Following the success of "Inquilaab", in 1997 Junoon went on their first full-scale tour of the United States, performing from Birmingham, Alabama, to Los Angeles where they appeared at the House of Blues and at the New York's Roosevelt Hotel, which was reviewed in the international edition of Newsweek. They also went on tour to Canada and the UAE through which Junoon's fame grew rapidly. In September 1997, Junoon released their fourth studio album, Azadi, which was the band's first international record deal after the band manager, Shehryar Ahmad, secured a deal with EMI/Virgin Records which released Azadi as Junoon's debut album in India. Within three weeks of the release of Azadi, the album had sold over a million copies in India alone and hit platinum sales status in a record of four weeks. The music video of the first single, "Sayonee", was shot by Pakistani director Asim Raza.

=== International Success (1998–2000) ===
Azadi was released in India in February 1998 by EMI. In March 1998, Zee TV invited Junoon to perform at the star-studded Zee Cine Awards in Mumbai, where the group received accolades from the crème de la crème of India's entertainment industry. It was also in 1998 that Junoon went on their first tour of India. The band's first appearance of the tour was held in New Delhi, India. After travelling throughout the country, Junoon saw crowds of as many as of 100,000 fans at shows in Lucknow, Kanpur, Bangalore and Delhi. On this very first tour of India, Junoon was in Chandigarh when India tested its nuclear weapons at Pokhran (14 May 1998). The next day, from their hotel room in New Delhi, in interviews to CNN and BBC on the nuclear tests, Junoon's founder Salman Ahmad suggested that the Indian and Pakistani leaders should spend more on education and health than on weapons of mass destruction. The Pakistani Government reacted by banning Junoon from performing in the country, as well as bans on the band's music being aired on Pakistani radio or television. Pakistan's Ministry of Information and Culture formally charged Junoon with challenging "the national opinion on the nuclear tests", as well as making comments in India "amounting to sedition and treason". Junoon denied all charges, reminding people of the fact that they had been victimised since the release of "Ehtesaab" because they chose to speak out against political corruption.

Sayonee
Sayonee, Junoon's single from their fourth studio album Azadi. The song is written by lead guitarist Salman Ahmad and lyricist Sabir Zafar. The single was a hit in South Asia, topping all music charts in Pakistan, India and Bangladesh. The success of the single led the album being the band's highest selling album in South Asia and Junoon received a platinum certification for hitting platinum sales for their album. Also, the single was nominated for the 'Best International Song' at the Channel V Awards in 1998.

Bulleya
Bulleya, Junoon's single from their fifth studio album Parvaaz. The single is a poetry by famous Sufi poet Bulleh Shah. The single was a massive hit in both Pakistan, Bangladesh and India, topping many music charts.

On 9 August, Junoon performed at New York's Central Park. This was one of Junoon's most legendary live performances, with over 20,000 fans in attendance. This concert was made into a live video and recording titled "Junoon Live at Central Park: A Tribute to Nusrat Fateh Ali Khan". Junoon then went on to perform at the BBC Mega Mela, which is the largest South Asian festival outside of South Asia, held in London, England. Junoon performed at all three days of the Mela and performed at the BBC Asian Awards where they were also awarded for their "Contribution to Asian Culture". On 28 November 1998, Junoon won the "Best International Group" title at the Channel V Music Awards, where they performed along with worldwide icons Sting, The Prodigy and Def Leppard. Azadi was nominated for "Best International Album", having achieved the prestigious honour of being the highest selling album in Pakistan, Bangladesh and India that year.

In March 1999, the Prime Minister of India, Atal Bihari Vajpayee, in a spirit of cross-border friendship, invited the band to perform at the anniversary of his government in Delhi. Travelling in the same gilded bus that Vajpayee had travelled cross-border to shake hands with Pakistan and sign the Lahore declaration, Junoon crossed the Wagah border from Lahore into India. In a very emotional performance before the Prime Minister, they performed the Jupiters hit, "Dosti" onstage with Indian group, Silk Route. Later the same year, Junoon released their fifth studio album, Parvaaz, which was recorded and mixed at Abbey Road Studios in London and was hailed by many critics as the finest work by Junoon to date and was released by EMI internationally. The album was mostly based on the poetry of Bulleh Shah and singles from the album such as "Bulleya", "Sajna", "Ghoom" and "Mitti" were a success and did well at the music charts. The album was produced by John Alec who came from New York to work on the band's fifth studio album. Also in 1999, UNESCO invited Junoon to perform at their Millennium Peace concert held in Paris, France. Junoon were presented with an award "Outstanding Achievements in Music and Peace" by UNESCO. The event was attended by many well-known artists from around the world like Yesudas, Lionel Richie, Montserrat Caballe and Zubin Mehta.

In 2000, Junoon released a compilation of their albums and videos, Millennium 1990–2000. The compilation album consisted of singles like "Azadi", "Muk Gaye Nay" and live tracks like "Allah Hu". Later the same year, Junoon performed in Japan. On 30 June, the band then went on to perform at the European Rock Festival, Roskilde Festival, near Copenhagen, in Denmark. Junoon became the first Asian band to perform at the festival and performed along with many well-known bands and musicians like Pearl Jam, Iron Maiden, The Cure, Queensrÿche and many other well-known artists from around the world. At the end of the year, Junoon performed at a concert in Dubai, UAE, with Bollywood singer Sonu Nigam, with nearly 20,000 in attendance, which was organised by Oberoi Middle East Events.

=== Continued success (2001–2004) ===
In March 2001, Junoon released its sixth studio album, Andaz (titled as Ishq in Pakistan). The album topped the music charts in Pakistan as well as in the Persian Gulf and South Asia. The first single entitled "Zamanae Ke Andaz (Saqi-Nama)" made it to No. 1 in the Persian Gulf and to No. 5 on the Asian charts. In April, Junoon performed to a sold-out concert at the Wembley Arena in London and went on to perform at the "United for Gujrat" concert, the first South Asian rock concert, held in New Delhi along with bands from India and Bangladesh, singing together to raise funds for the Gujrat earthquake victims. In June, Salman Ahmad attended the UN General Assembly in New York where he was appointed as the 'Goodwill Ambassador' of Pakistan by United Nations. On 30 June, Junoon performed at the Celebrate Brooklyn festival at Prospect Park Bandshell in Brooklyn, New York. On 7 July, the band performed at the Hyatt Regency in Chicago, Illinois. In September, Junoon did a concert in Norway with Morten Harket, lead vocalist of A-ha, performing a duet "Piya (Ocean of Love)". The same year, the band also made a trip China to perform a peace concert.

Following the terrorist attacks on 11 September 2001, Junoon, in the aftermath of the attacks, travelled to the United States for a series of shows at universities and high schools. On 9 October, the band played a peace concert at the United Nations (UN). They became the first ever rock band to be invited to perform at the United Nations general assembly, by UN secretary-general Kofi Annan. On 29 November, the music television channel, VH1, aired a special documentary, Islamabad: Rock City, about the group hosted by Susan Sarandon. On 25 December, Junoon had once again been embraced by the Pakistani government, and were even joined on stage by then the President, General Pervez Musharraf, as he invited them to perform at the mausoleum of Pakistan's founder, Muhammad Ali Jinnah, on Jinnah's birthday. Although Junoon continues to promote peace and harmony, the band also speaks out on contentious issues that most popular groups avoid. The band served as goodwill ambassadors for HIV/AIDS awareness for the UN and raised several issues.

In 2002, Junoon opened a new chapter by releasing the antiterrorism song "No More" in English, yet another attempt by the group to spread their message to a wider audience. Although, Junoon had previously released English songs on their first two albums, such as "Our Land", "Lady Magic", "Downtown Princes" and "Game of Chance". The song "No More" is the first English song for which Junoon released a music video. CNN aired a 30-minute interview of Junoon on the program Talk Asia. They received rave reviews in The New York Times, Billboard, The New York Post, Newsweek, and others. On 29 March, Junoon released their second live album and the overall twelfth album, Daur-e-Junoon.

On 16 February 2003, Junoon performed at the Basant Festival Show held in Lahore. On May, 5, the band went to Karachi to perform at the PAF Creek Club. On 18 June, Junoon performed live at the Royal Albert Hall, London, England. On July, 17, the documentary The Rock Star and the Mullahs by Wide Angel was aired on BBC based upon Junoon and music in Islam. In December, Junoon released their seventh studio album, Dewaar. The single "Garaj Baras" was selected as the soundtrack of the Bollywood movie Paap directed by Pooja Bhatt, the song topped the charts in the country again in 2004. Another single off the album "Pappu Yaar" shot to the No. 1 spot on the music charts in Pakistan. This was the album which last featured the trio together. After the release of the band's seventh studio album bassist, Brian O'Connell went back to United States and vocalist, Ali Azmat went on to pursue his career as a solo singer. In April 2004, Junoon released their third compilation album, Dewaar: The Best of Junoon. In August, Junoon released Ghoom Taana video and a special documentary entitled "Building Bridges" which was screened at a launch ceremony in Karachi in time for the Independence Day celebrations of Pakistan and India. On 14 October, Journeyman Pictures released a short film documentary based on Pakistani music featuring local rock bands, Junoon and Fuzön.

=== Breakup (2005–2008) ===
Dewaar was the album which last featured the trio together. After the release of the album Brian O'Connell went back to United States. Since his departure, Pakistani musician Mekaal Hasan and the band's producer John Alec have been playing bass guitar for live shows in place. On 2 February 2005, Junoon performed a charity concert for the Indian Ocean earthquake and tsunami victims at Alhamra Auditorium in Lahore. On 3 March, Salman Ahmad appeared on the documentary It's My Country Too: Muslim Americans aired on BBC television documentary strand This World. The last Junoon concert to feature Ali Azmat took place in Dubai, UAE in March 2005 after which Ali Azmat went on to pursue his career as a solo singer. Later the same year, he released his debut solo album, Social Circus. Shehryar Ahmad, the band manager also departed from the band. Salman Ahmad also released his debut solo album, Infiniti in July 2005.

In September 2007, Junoon re-released three albums, Parvaaz, Azadi and Infiniti with Magnatune. On 11 December, Junoon performed at the Nobel Peace Prize Concert in Oslo, Norway together with a variety of artists, which was broadcast live to over 100 countries.

On 25 May 2008, Junoon performed in Srinagar for the first time before an audience of thousands. On 8 June, Ali Azmat performed a duet of "Garaj Baras" with Rahat Fateh Ali Khan along with singles from his solo albums at the Coke Studio season one first session. On 15 August, Ali Azmat released his second album, Klashinfolk, which was recorded at Mekaal Hasan Studios in Lahore. The album received significant critical acclaim across Pakistan, although, like the previous album, it was not a huge commercial success.

=== Post-breakup: Rock & Roll Jihad (2009–2010) ===
Junoon performing live at the 'Concert of Pakistan', on 12 September 2009

On 12 September 2009, Junoon performed at the Concert for Pakistan at the United Nations General Assembly Hall. The event also featured Outlandish and Sting. Salman Ahmad performed a cover of "All Along the Watchtower" with Gavin Rossdale.

In November 2009, Ahmad announced, under the Junoon name, that "Love Can You Take Me Back" would be the first single from an upcoming album. His memoir, Rock & Roll Jihad: A Muslim Rock Star's Revolution, was published in January 2010 and discussed his career with Junoon. The album Rock & Roll Jihad was released on 1 June 2010 and was presented as a musical account of Ahmad's career and his work with Junoon.

=== Partial Reunion: Junoon's 20th anniversary (2011–2012) ===
On 26 January 2011, Junoon performed at Lahore University of Management Sciences for United Nations HIV/AIDS campaign. On 16 March, the single "Pakistan Humara" in collaboration with Peter Gabriel was dedicated to the Pakistan cricket team playing at the 2011 Cricket World Cup. On 18 March, Junoon performed at The College of William & Mary as part of W&M's Asian studies initiative. On 23 March, Junoon launched the music video of the single "Pakistan Humara" directed by Asad Pathan.

On 12 August, in an interview with The Express Tribune, Ahmad confirmed that he is set to celebrate Junoon's 20th anniversary with the band's former bassist Brian O'Connell. "We are reaching Junoon's 20th anniversary, so I'm excited about more projects coming up regarding that," Ahmad told The Express Tribune. Ahmad also confirmed that Junoon's 20th anniversary celebration concert will be held at the Asia Society on 24 September in New York. The band also announced that it will release an album to mark two decades of Junoon. The album will be featuring Strings, Farhan Saeed, Bilal Khan, Outlandish, Aag, Usman Riaz, Laal's Taimur Rahman, Momina Mustehsan, and Sajid & Zeeshan. Shoaib Mansoor will be writing lyrics for the band's anniversary album.

On 24 September, Junoon celebrated their 20th anniversary by performing a concert at the Asia Society & Museum in New York City. It was after 8 years that both Salman Ahmad and Brian O'Connell shared the same stage together to celebrate the band's reunion and anniversary. In response to the 20th Anniversary of the band, former vocalist, Ali Azmat in an interview with Newsweek Pakistan said that he does not want to associate his name with Junoon as there are some personal issues between Salman Ahmad and him. Azmat also confirmed that Salman Ahmad invited him to be part of the 20th Anniversary reunion concert but he never replied to his emails. On 30 September, Junoon performed at the Crowell Concert Hall in Wesleyan University, Middletown, Connecticut, United States and also released the first edition of their 20th Anniversary album, Junoon 20.

On 21 December, EMI Pakistan released Junoon's 20th anniversary album volume I in a ceremony held at Marriott Hotel, Karachi, Pakistan. On 25 December, Salman Ahmad announced that he will be collaborating with former Vital Signs lead vocalist, Junaid Jamshed to record a 21st-century version of the two famous Pakistani patriotic songs "Dil Dil Pakistan" and "Jazba-e-Junoon". Ahmad also stated that the rehearsal session was captured by Ahmad's son, Imran, with his phone. "The video and the photo contain a true emotion providing a rare glimpse of hope for the new generation. Two days ago, my dear friend and Vital Signs bandmate, Junaid Jamshed and I came together to rehearse after many years. We felt inspired to sing two anthems of our youth; 'Jazba Junoon' and 'Dil Dil Pakistan'."

On 28 April 2012, Junoon travelled on a tour to India performing at Mumbai. On 3 May, Junoon paid tribute to Khwaja Gharib Nawaz by performing an informal concert of Sufi songs in Ajmer Sharif. Followed by performing at BlueFrog in the capital city, New Delhi at a sold-out concert on 10 May. Salman Ahmed, lead vocalist of the band, confirmed, during his tour to India, in an interview that he has collaborated with singer Sunidhi Chauhan recording two songs, "Yaaron" and "Kaise Bolun", for Vicky Kumar's Bollywood movie, Rhythm.

=== Collaborations (2013–2016) ===
Former members of Vital Signs and Junoon collaborated to release a patriotic song, "Naya Pakistan". The song is written by Salman Ahmad and Aania Shah featuring Shahi Hassan on bass, Nusrat Hussain on keyboards and percussions, and vocalist Junaid Jamshed. The song was recorded at Indus Music World Studios and released on 22 February 2013.

Salman Ahmed while talking about his latest project at Asia Talk on BBC said, "For almost a decade, Junaid has always asked me not to bring guitar or to ask him to sing. When you are friends with somebody you always have to transcend differences and I respect Junaid's views. Junaid once told me that his biggest regret was not to be a part of Jazba Junoon's recording. So when we came up with 'Naya Pakistan', I asked him that this is the chance that's not going to come again so finally Junaid accepted the offer with the condition that he will sing only the opening lines with no music at all." and further added "it signifies the metaphor for unity as we have to compromise for unity in hope of Naya Pakistan."

After a long hiatus, Junoon released a new album titled Door in December 2016 to celebrate the 25th anniversary of the band. The first single from the album is also titled "Door Bohat Door" and the music video was shot in Gwadar, Balochistan featuring Wasim Akram.

=== Coke Studio debut and more collaborations (2017) ===
On 18 August, Junoon produced and performed their hit song "Sayonee" at Coke Studio 10th season, where Salman Ahmad served as the musical director and featured renowned artists like Rahat Fateh Ali Khan and Ali Noor, from Noori on the vocals. The single received mixed reviews from many critics, such as a writer for Dawn reportedly saying that "even the best fall down sometimes" while a piece in The News International said, "'Sayonee', sung by Ali Noor and Rahat Fateh Ali Khan with music directed by Salman Ahmed as Junoon is quite possibly one of the worst songs to have emerged from Coke Studio – not from just this season but in its ten years, the standard has never dropped to this degree until now." and the Daily Pakistan reported that the rendition "...left a bad taste in your mouth".

After the release of "Sayonee", Salman Ahmad recomposed the song "Ghoom Taana" for Coke Studio, he revealed to Samaa TV about this recreation, "Ayesha, Eman, Sajar and Simal were at a singing competition where I was a judge in January. I picked them out of 25 participants." He then convinced the executive producers of the show; Bilal Maqsood and Faisal Kapadia; to give them a chance and they accepted. On bringing forward the new talent; the four girls called Irteassh; he said, "We just need to give them a platform of arts and culture. They will succeed and show the world that Pakistan is a beautiful and rich country". He changed the old sound of the song to add a cinematic feel. While, he added that, Momina Mustehsan also wanted to join him as she sung earlier with him when they were in New York.

=== Reunion (2018–present) ===
In August 2018, Ali Azmat, Brian O'Connell, and Salman Ahmad came together once again to release a new video for the song "Khudi", sponsored by a biscuit company. On 25 December 2018, Junoon including Ali Azmat, Salman Ahmad and Brian O Connell reunited after 13 years to a sold-out concert in Karachi, Pakistan at the Moin Khan Academy.

This was followed by a reunion concert at the Dubai Duty Free Tennis Stadium on 18 January 2019, attended by more than 6,000 people. Junoon subsequently performed in London and Leeds in August 2019, before returning to Dubai for another concert on 29 November. American musician Taylor Simpson played drums for the band during its reunion performances and subsequent international touring.

On February 18, Junoon performed at the Dubai Exhibition Centre at Dubai Expo 2020 representing the line up featured by the Pakistan pavilion. The concert was unique in that it featured Faisal Kapadia and Goher Mumtaz during the closing set (who were in attendance during the event).

== Music ==
No More
No More, from the live album Junoon for Peace. The song is based on a poem by musician, lyricist and journalist, Polar Levine.

=== Language ===
On their debut album Junoon and their second album Talaash, songs were written in both the English and Urdu languages, but since then the band has only written songs in Urdu, with the only exceptions being "No More" from the live album Junoon for Peace and the single "Piya (Ocean of Love)", which is a duet with Morten Harket of A-ha. The soundtrack album Rock & Roll Jihad released in 2010 contain five tracks written in English by Salman Ahmad. Some of the songs recorded by Junoon are based on traditional or Sufi compositions in Punjabi, Saraiki, and other languages spoken in Pakistan.

=== Influence ===
Salman Ahmad, writer of most of the band's lyrics and music scores, says that he gets most of his inspiration for Junoon's songs from Led Zeppelin and Nusrat Fateh Ali Khan music. Songs like "Lal Meri Pat" (from Azadi), "Dharti" (from Andaz) and "Mera Mahi" (from Inquilaab) are some examples of this influence. Another great influence of the band was poetry. The lyrics for the song "Khwaab" was taken by a poem called"khwaab hakikat na sahi" by a poet named Faiza Fiza in her book, chaand aur mein. Other songs, such as "Garaj Baras" and "Taara Jala" (from Dewaar) have elements of hard rock, and some others, like "Yaar Bina" (from Azadi), "Zamane Ke Andaz" (from Andaz) and the album Parvaaz have elements of classical music. Bands stated as influence include Led Zeppelin, Pink Floyd, Van Halen, U2, Bee Gees, A-ha and Queen.

Poetry by famous poets like Maulana Rumi, Allama Iqbal and Bulleh Shah are also a big influence on Junoon's music.

On the other hand, Junoon has also been noted as a source of inspiration for other bands. Atif Aslam, former lead vocalist of rock band Jal, has done many covers of Junoon's music, most notably "Dosti" of which a video was also released. Atif Aslam also acknowledged that Junoon had greatly inspired him. Goher Mumtaz, lead guitarist of Jal, has also shown fondness for Junoon and acknowledged that some early work of the band has inspired him. In an interview, internationally acclaimed pop rock band Strings have acknowledged that Junoon has been influential to the band for making a comeback in the local music industry in 2000. In 2007, Strings performed a cover of Junoon's single version of "Lal Meri Pat" at Oslo Mela. Underground local band, Jumbo Jutt paid tribute to Junoon by covering their single "Sajna". Pakistani rock band Call performed a live session cover of Junoon's hit song "Bulleya" on Indus Music. Indian singer Harshdeep Kaur have covered Junoon's single "Saeein" in many live performances. The instrumental song "Aap Aur Hum" (also known as "Jugalbandi", from Talaash) was covered by American rock band Black Clover Leaf, adding vocals to the instrumental and releasing it on their self-titled debut album as "Breathe", in 2009.

=== Musical style ===
Jazba-e-Junoon
Jazba-e-Junoon, Junoon's single from their third studio album Inquilaab.

Garaj Baras
Garaj Baras, Junoon's single from their seventh studio album Dewaar. The single also featured as a soundtrack of the Bollywood movie Paap directed by Pooja Bhatt.

Junoon performs a blend of western music and classical eastern poetry. Junoon aimed to combine loud guitar riffs with the tranquility of Sufi poetry by the likes of Maulana Rumi, Shah Hussain, Bulleh Shah (in the song "Bulleya") and Allama Iqbal. Their music has been based on worldly issues and the goal of peace in the world.

While the music of Junoon is centered around a male lead singer, the band has also featured some female vocals on their albums ever since their self-titled debut release Junoon. Since the release of their third studio album Inquilaab the band's music has been based on classical eastern poetry blending with western music. Their seventh studio album Dewaar featured elements of hard rock and heavy metal music with songs like "Garaj Baras" and "Dewaar".

Junoon performing live at the Channel V Music Awards in 1998.

=== Live performances ===
As the band started to gain success after the release of their third studio album Inquilaab, Junoon went on their first full-scale tour of the United States, performing from Birmingham, Alabama, to Los Angeles where the appeared at the House of Blues and from there to New York's Roosevelt Hotel, which featured in Newsweek.

== Awards and nominations ==
Junoon won the "Best International Group" award at the Channel V Awards in New Delhi in 1998, beating Prodigy, Sting and Def Leppard. The Band's first international release Azadi, went triple platinum in India alone. "Sayonee" was at the top of the MTV India and Channel V charts for over two months. Junoon won the Award for "Best Rock Band" at the Indus Music awards in 2004 and from ARY Asian/Bollywood Awards. Junoon has also been awarded several awards for their contribution towards peace and South East culture by BBC, UNESCO and South Asian Journalists Association.

Junoon was nominated for Best Musical Group at the Lux Style Awards several years in a row

== Discography ==
=== Studio albums ===
- Junoon (1991)
- Talaash (1993)
- Inquilaab (1996)
- Azadi (1997)
- Parvaaz (1999)
- Andaz (2001)
- Dewaar (2003)
- Door (2016)
- Junoon Studio (2020)

== Band members ==
Current members

- Salman Ahmad – vocals, lead guitar (1990–present)
- Ali Azmat – vocals, rhythm guitar (1990–2005, 2018–present)
- Brian O'Connell – bass guitar, backing vocals (1992–2003, 2011–2017, 2018–present)

Former members

- Nusrat Hussain – keyboards (1990–1998)

== See also ==
- List of Pakistani music bands

== Bibliography ==
=== Published sources ===
- Boston Globe, 2 May 2002, p. B1.
- Herald, May 2003.
- Journal News (Westchester, NY), 30 June 2001, p. B3.
- Los Angeles Times, 7 August 1998, p. 6.
- San Francisco Chronicle, 10 February 2003, p. A1.
- Seattle Times, 2 May 2002, p. F3

=== Literature ===
- Ahmad, Salman (2010). Rock & Roll Jihad: A Muslim Rock Star's Revolution. United States: Free Press. ISBN 9781416597674.
