= Nusrat Hussain =

Pop musician of Pakistan

- Born: Nusrat Hussain
- Genres: rock, pop
- Occupations: Airline pilot, musician
- Instruments: Guitar, keyboards
- Years active: 1987 – present

Nusrat Hussain (Urdu:نصرت حسین) is a Pakistani musician, retired airline pilot, guitarist, and keyboardist.

== Career ==
Nusrat Hussain played guitar for the band Vital Signs and keyboard for Junoon in the mid-1990s. He soon left both bands, opting for a career as a commercial pilot in Pakistan's national flag-carrier PIA.

According to a major newspaper of Pakistan, "It was Nusrat Hussain who took the initial shot at composing the song Dil Dil Pakistan, which was written by Nisar Nasir. Shoaib hated the first draft. He wanted it to be a lot catchier. Nusrat had another go and came up with an intro that was appreciated by the other members. Encouraged by it, the others (especially Junaid Jamshed), added their own inputs and ideas until the tune was completed, approved by Shoaib and recorded...For years now, 'Dil Dil Pakistan' is regarded to be the 'second Pakistani national anthem'."

After his departure from Junoon, Nusrat released a solo album Amrit (1992) which featured popular tracks such as Jo Chaho Tum and Teri Awaz. He made a comeback in 2012 with his album Kaho, which was a collaboration between him and music producer Sarmad Ghafoor.

Nusrat Hussain is a retired pilot, having first worked for Pakistan International Airlines, and he later captained Boeing 777 aircraft for Qatar Airways.

== Discography ==
=== Albums ===
- Amrit (1992)
- Kaho (2012)

=== Singles ===
- Teri Awaz
- Erum
- Jo Chaho Tum
- Crazy Lady
- Maza Dard Ka

== See also ==
- List of Pakistani musicians
