= Ali Azmat =

Pakistani singer (born 1970)

Ali Azmat Butt
- علی عظمت بٹ
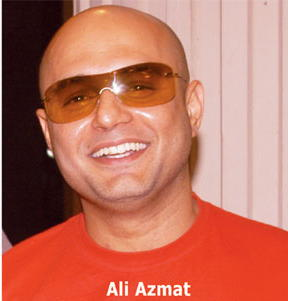
- Born: 20 April 1970 (age 56); Havelian, Khyber Pakhtunkhwa, Pakistan
- Citizenship: Pakistani
- Occupations: Musician, singer-songwriter, Sufi rock music vocalist
- Children: 2 daughters
- Relatives: Mustafa Zahid (cousin)
- Musical career
- Origin: Lahore, Punjab, Pakistan
- Genres: Rock; Sufi rock
- Occupations: Singer-songwriter; actor
- Instruments: Vocals; guitar
- Years active: 1986 – present
- Labels: Fire Records; Sadaf; EMI; Independent
- Member of: Junoon
- Formerly of: Jupiters

Ali Azmat Butt (born 20 April 1970) is a Pakistani singer-songwriter, musician and actor. He is best known as the lead singer for the influential Sufi rock band Junoon and for his subsequent solo career, followed by an acting career.

In 2001, with Junoon, he became part of the first Pakistani band ever to perform at the United Nations General Assembly.

== Early life and education ==
Ali Azmat was born in Havelian, Khyber Pakhtunkhwa, into a family of ethnic Kashmiri descent, where his grandfather was posted as the station master of the Havelian railway station. He grew up in Garhi Shahu, Lahore and speaks Punjabi as his native language. His father Nazir Ahmed Butt was a middle-class businessman who died in 2013.

Azmat went to Sydney, Australia, for his higher studies but due to financial problems, soon returned to Pakistan where he completed his university degree.

His first band Jupiters was known for performing covers at small gigs in Lahore.

== Music career ==
=== Jupiters ===
Ali Azmat started his music career with Jupiters in 1986, based in his hometown of Lahore. Jupiters were known for doing covers of American pop and rock songs at small gigs. While with them, Azmat wrote his legendary hit song "Dosti". He later sang and recorded "Dosti" with Junoon, after which the song gained national fame.

=== Junoon ===
Azmat left Jupiters in 1990 to join Junoon. He released his first album Junoon with the band. The album was produced by the band's founder and lead-guitarist Salman Ahmad. Azmat's vocals featured on all the songs except Khwaab, Jiyain and Jogiya. After the launch of the band's second album Talaash, both Ali Azmat and Junoon rose to fame.

The band's 1995 album, Inquilaab, was a major hit and its only single, "Jazba-e-Junoon", was a super hit and topped the charts, it became the band's signature song and national song of 1996 Cricket World Cup and the Pakistan national cricket team. Azmat gained further success after the release of the Sufi rock hit single "Sayonee" from their fourth album Azadi (1997).

In 1996, Junoon, launched a compilation album called Kashmakash, the first compilation album in Pakistan. The album contained two new song Ehtesaab and Meri Awaz Suno. The song Ehtesaab "Ehtesaab", which showed the corruption of politicians, caused a major stir, and the government banned the song and video from the state television.

In 1997, Junoon released their 4th studio album called Azadi, which got the band international fame.

In 1999, Junoon released their 5th studio album. Titled Parvaaz, it consisted of many sufi songs.

In 2001, Junoon released their 6th studio album called Ishq (internationally known as Andaz).

In 2004, Junoon released their 7th studio album called Dewaar, which wass the last studio album produced by the band.

On 25 December 2018, Junoon made a comeback after 13 years when they performed at a reunion concert in Karachi arranged by Sooper which was attended by over 10,0000 fans and followers.

=== Solo career ===
Afterthe breaking up of Junoon, Azmat released his first solo album Social Circus (2005), whose single "Na Re Na" received positive reviews and became a major hit inthe country. Azmat released four further albums:

- Klashinkfolk (2008), the title blending the words "Kalashnikov" – the Urdu synonym for the AK-47 assault rifle – and "folk" music, symbolizing a fusion of aggressive rock with traditional folk elements;
- Josh-e-Junoon (2010) whose title track "Josh-e-Junoon" became the anthem for the Pakistan cricket team during the 2011 Cricket World Cup;
- Bum Phatta (2011); and
- Chalta Main Jaun (2011).

=== Bollywood ===
Azmat stepped into Bollywood in 2003, when his single "Garaj Baras" from Junoon's album Azadi was used for the movie Paap.

In 2012, Azmat recorded two songs "Yeh Jism Hai Toh Kya" and "Maula" for Bollywood erotic thriller Jism 2.

== Acting career ==
He launched his acting career in the 1990s with Talaash, a telefilm featuring the group Junoon, and later in cinema with notable roles in box-office hits such as Waar (2013) and The Legend of Maula Jatt (2022).

== Personal life ==
=== Family ===
Having married at the age of 41 due to family pressure, he's the father of two daughters.

=== Politics ===
Ali Azmat is close to Islamist defence analyst Zaid Hamid and hosted his TV show Iqbal Ka Pakistan in 2008–2009, where both discussed the philosophy of Allama Iqbal and a supposed Zionist conspiracy against the Islamic world.

== Awards and nominations ==
Junoon won the Best International Group award at the Channel V Awards in New Delhi in 1998, beating The Prodigy, Sting and Def Leppard. The band's first international release, Azadi, went triple platinum in India alone. "Sayonee" was at the top of the MTV India and Channel V charts for over two months. Junoon won the Award for Best Rock Band at the Indus Music Awards in 2004. Indus Music Awards and from ARY Asian/Bollywood Awards. Junoon has also been awarded several awards for their contribution towards peace and South East culture by BBC, UNESCO, and South Asian Journalists Association. Junoon was nominated for Best Musical Group at the Lux Style Awards several years in a row.

- First Indus Style Awards (2006)
- Won - Best Sound of Style Award. – 3rd Jazz IM Award (2006)
- Won - Best Pop Male Artist.
- The Nestle Fruita Vitals Pakistan Style Awards (2010)

== Discography ==
Year	Song(s)	Album(s)
2003	"Garaj Baras"	Paap
2005		Social Circus
2008		Klashinfolk
2008	"Garaj Baras", "Mein Challa"	Coke Studio Season 1
2010	"Josh-e-Junoon"	Josh-e-Junoon
2011		Bum Phatta
2011		Chalta Mein Jaaon
2012	"Maula", "Yeh Jism Hai Toh Kya"	Jism 2
2012		Josh
2013		Waar
2013	"Babu Bhai"	Coke Studio Season 6
2015	"Rangeela"	Coke Studio Season 8
2015	"Main To Yahin Hoon Lekin"	Main Aur Charles
2016	"Man Kunto Maula"	Coke Studio Season 9
2018	"Dil Hai Pakistani"	Coke Studio Season 11
2024	"Mannippu"	Kanguva

== Filmography ==
=== Television ===
Year	Title	Role	Channel	Note
1994	Talaash	Ali	PTV	Telefilm
1996	Pal Do Pal	Dr. Khush Bakht	PTV	Drama

=== Films ===
Year	Title	Role
2013	Waar	Ejaz Khan
2022	The Legend of Maula Jatt	Gogi
