= Salman Ahmad =

Pakistani musician

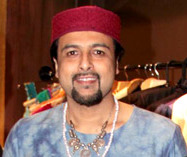
- Salman Ahmad

Background information
- Born: Salman Ahmad; 12 December 1963 (age 62); Lahore, Punjab, Pakistan
- Genres: Sufi rock, hard rock, heavy metal, psychedelic rock
- Occupations: Musician, physician
- Instruments: Vocals, guitar, bass
- Years active: 1989 – present
- Labels: Coke Studio, EMI Records, PTV Studios, Studio 146
- Member of: Junoon band

Salman Ahmad (Urdu: سلمان احمد, born 12 December 1963) is a Pakistani born-American musician, rock guitarist, physician, activist, occasional actor and professor at the City University of New York.

He earned nationwide popularity in 1998 for his unique style of neoclassical playing in rock. An early engineer of the Vital Signs, he formed Junoon (lit. Passion) in 1990 with American bassist Brian O'Connell and pioneered the Sufi influenced rock music in Pakistan. He started his activism in the mid-1990s and has been involved in two BBC documentaries concerning the issues in Pakistan such as society, education, religion and science.

He has served as the UN Goodwill Ambassador for HIV/AIDS Programme towards spreading awareness about HIV in South Asia. While working with Pakistan's media to help initiate peace between India and Pakistan, Ahmad continues to produce documentaries and solo guitar albums. At present, he is a tenured professor at the Queens College of the City University of New York. With Junoon band having been disintegrated, Salman continues to perform as a solo artist under the "Junoon" label and has moved to New York and released one album, "Infiniti" (2005), as a solo artist.

== Early life ==
Salman Ahmad spent his childhood in Pakistan and was educated at Aitchison College, before moving to New York when his father got a job in the airline industry. Ahmad then attended middle and high school in the United States, where he was first exposed to rock music at a Led Zeppelin concert at Madison Square Garden and later to Van Halen band. Motivated to become a musician, he began learning the guitar against his parents wishes. After graduation, he returned to Pakistan in order to attend medical school. However, due to vast changes in the political climate and the advent of extremism, Ahmad's guitar playing was repressed. He took action by playing at covert talent shows, unfazed by criticism and even death threats from extremists. These underground performances and the consequent censorship set the stage for him to become a peace advocate and eventually ending up founding the rock bands Junoon and Vital Signs.

== Music career ==
He has been teaching a class on music titled "Islamic Music and Culture of South Asia", as a guest faculty at Queens College. This year, he started his second semester as a guest faculty. On 1 March 2008, Ahmad performed with Yale Strom (a world leading Klezmer artist) at Temple Beth Sholom in Roslyn Heights as part of another "Common Chords II" concert celebrating Muslim and Jewish Music. Together with Strom, Ahmad leads the multi-faith ensemble Common Chords, whose members include Chatterjee, dhol player Sunny Jain, bassist Mark Dresser, vocalist Elizabeth Schwartz and others. In 2016, his new song "Kaise Bolun" from an upcoming Bollywood movie "Rhythm" starring Adeel Chaudhry has received enormous negative feedback from his fans on social media through showing their discomfort over song's music and video. According to people, they never expected such kind of music from legendary Salman Ahmad.

=== Nobel Peace Prize concert in Norway ===
Televised in around 100 countries, Ahmad and his band Junoon performed with artists from all over the world at the Nobel Peace Prize Concert in Oslo, Norway, on 11 December 2007. He also played at the Nobel Peace Prize Ceremony on 9 December 2007, where he was joined by tabla virtuoso Pandit Samir Chatterjee.

=== Censorship on Junoon ===
Ahmad and his band Junoon suffered political censorship in Pakistan during the administration of Benazir Bhutto in the 1990s, partly due to a song denouncing political corruption. In 1998 during the administration of Nawaz Sharif, Junoon was again banned in Pakistan, because they protested against the nuclear power tests in India as well as their own country by saying, "Why escalate the arms race when people still need water? Why see our neighbors as enemies when we are so close to each other?".

Ahmad played at the Roskilde Festival in 2000 under the banner of Freemuse, just a couple of years after the ban. As a musician who faced censorship in his home country, Ahmad says that "there is no conflict between my faith and my music, you can be a Muslim and play electric guitar".

In 2006, during a Freemuse conference in Beirut, he was part of one of the rare occasions where music and religion were taken seriously and discussions on music and Islam focused on theology and not just social and cultural patterns. About this he said, "I've taken part in Freemuse dialogue meetings and press meetings. They have always been great meeting places for musicians, researchers and journalists and I've always felt that understanding the motivations behind and the mechanisms of censorship have been in focus – not just condemning censorship. Having said that, we, the artists, should always be ready to defend our colleagues when the rights to freedom of expression are attacked, and thus we need an organisation such as Freemuse to help us do this".

== Other work ==
=== Acting ===
Ahmad has acted in television dramas.

- Dhundle Raste, 1989 (Featured Vital Signs band)
- Aahat, 1991
- Talaash, 1994 (Featured Junoon band)
- Gulls & Guys, 1999 (Documentary travel reality show)

The HBO documentary Open Your Eyes features the original song Open Your Eyes, composed by Salman Ahmad with vocals from Peter Gabriel.

=== Writing ===
Salman Ahmad published an autobiographical work titled Rock & Roll Jihad: A Muslim Rock Star's Revolution in January 2010, was published by Simon & Schuster.

=== Social work ===
In 2009, Ahmad and his wife Samina were involved in raising money for Swat's Internally displaced persons.

As a UNAIDS Goodwill ambassador, he worked to raise awareness about HIV/AIDS. Ahmad while opening the first dialogue with young people at IX International Congress on AIDS in Asia and the Pacific's (ICAAP) Community Dialogue Space in 2009 said, "Young people need to be on board to turn the tide, as it is their decision-making over their bodies and their sexuality that will determine their future status".

=== Politics ===
Salman Ahmad has been often seen at Pakistan Tehreek-e-Insaf's (tr. Pakistan Justice Party; simply known as PTI) rallies which is founded by cricketer-turned politician Imran Khan. Salman Ahmad sings patriotic and revolutionary songs in these rallies which revitalizes the whole environment, he is often alleged as being a member of the party as well.

In October 2016, Salman Ahmad was taken into custody by Islamabad police along with various other PTI's workers after the activists clashed with the law enforcement officers in Rawalpindi.

In December 2024, his basic membership from PTI was cancelled following a notification arguing that Salman Ahmad had written "unwarranted and scurrilous posts" about the relatives of Imran Khan, and that he was "sowing division and discontent" among PTI members and sympathizers, the party eventually asking him to dissociate from the party in media appearances.

== See also ==
- List of Pakistani musicians
- Music of Pakistan
