= Sufi rock =

Genre that combines rock music with classical Islamic sufi traditions

- Stylistic origins: Rock; Sufi music; Qawwali; raga rock
- Cultural origins: Early 1990s, Pakistan and Turkey

Local scenes
- Pakistan; Turkey

Other topics
- Folk rock

Sufi rock or Sufi folk rock is a subgenre of rock music that combines rock with classical Islamic Sufi music traditions. It emerged in the early 1990s and became widely popular in the late 1990s in Pakistan and Turkey. The term "Sufi rock" was coined in 1993 by writer Nadeem F. Paracha to define the Pakistani band Junoon, who pioneered the process of fusing conventional rock music with folk Sufi music and imagery.

== History ==
It is mostly based on the poetry of famous Sufi poets such as Rumi, Hafez, Shah Abdul Latif Bhittai, Bulleh Shah, Waris Shah and even Kabir and is mostly sung in languages such as Urdu, Pashto, Punjabi, Sindhi, Persian and Turkish.

== See also ==
- Pakistani rock
- Culture of India
- Music of Pakistan
- Music of India
- Pakistani hip hop
- Culture of Pakistan
- Taqwacore
