= Finite (disambiguation) =

Finite, or variants, may refer to:

- Finite set, a set whose cardinality (number of elements) is some natural number
- Finite verb, a verb form that has a subject, usually being inflected or marked for person and/or tense or aspect
- "Finite", a song by Sara Groves from the album Invisible Empires
- Finity, a 1999 novel by John Barnes
- Finiteness, being limited

== See also ==
- Finite number (disambiguation)
- Finite part (disambiguation)
- Finite map (disambiguation)
- Finite presentation (disambiguation)
- Finite type (disambiguation)
- Nonfinite (disambiguation)
