= Xfinity Center =

Xfinity Center may refer to:

- Xfinity Center (Massachusetts), an amphitheater in Mansfield, Massachusetts, U.S.
- Xfinity Center (Maryland), an arena and activities center at the University of Maryland in College Park, Maryland, U.S.

== See also ==
- Xfinity Mobile Arena, a multi-purpose arena in Philadelphia, Pennsylvania, U.S.
- Xfinity Arena, now Angel of the Winds Arena, a venue in Everett, Washington, U.S.
- Xfinity Live! Philadelphia, now Stateside Live!, a venue in Pennsylvania, U.S.
- Xfinity Theatre, an amphitheatre in Hartford, Connecticut, U.S.
- Xfinity (disambiguation)
- Comcast Center (disambiguation)
