= Xfinity (disambiguation) =

Xfinity is a brand of Comcast Corporation used to market various products.

Xfinity may also refer to:

== Media services ==
- Rogers Xfinity, a brand used by Rogers Cable in Canada in partnership with Comcast
  - Rogers Xfinity Internet, Rogers' broadband internet service
- Xfinity Flex, an internet television service
- Xfinity Streampix, an online on demand media streaming service

== Motorsports ==
- NASCAR Xfinity Series, a stock car racing series in the United States
- Xfinity 500, a stock car race held at Martinsville Speedway in Ridgeway, Virginia, U.S.

== Venues ==
- Xfinity Arena, former name of Angel of the Winds Arena, a venue in Everett, Washington, U.S.
- Xfinity Center (disambiguation), several venues in the United States
- Stateside Live!, a venue in Pennsylvania, U.S. formerly called Xfinity Live! Philadelphia
- Xfinity Theatre, an amphitheatre in Hartford, Connecticut, U.S.

== See also ==
- Infinity (disambiguation)
