= Naval Hospital Philadelphia =

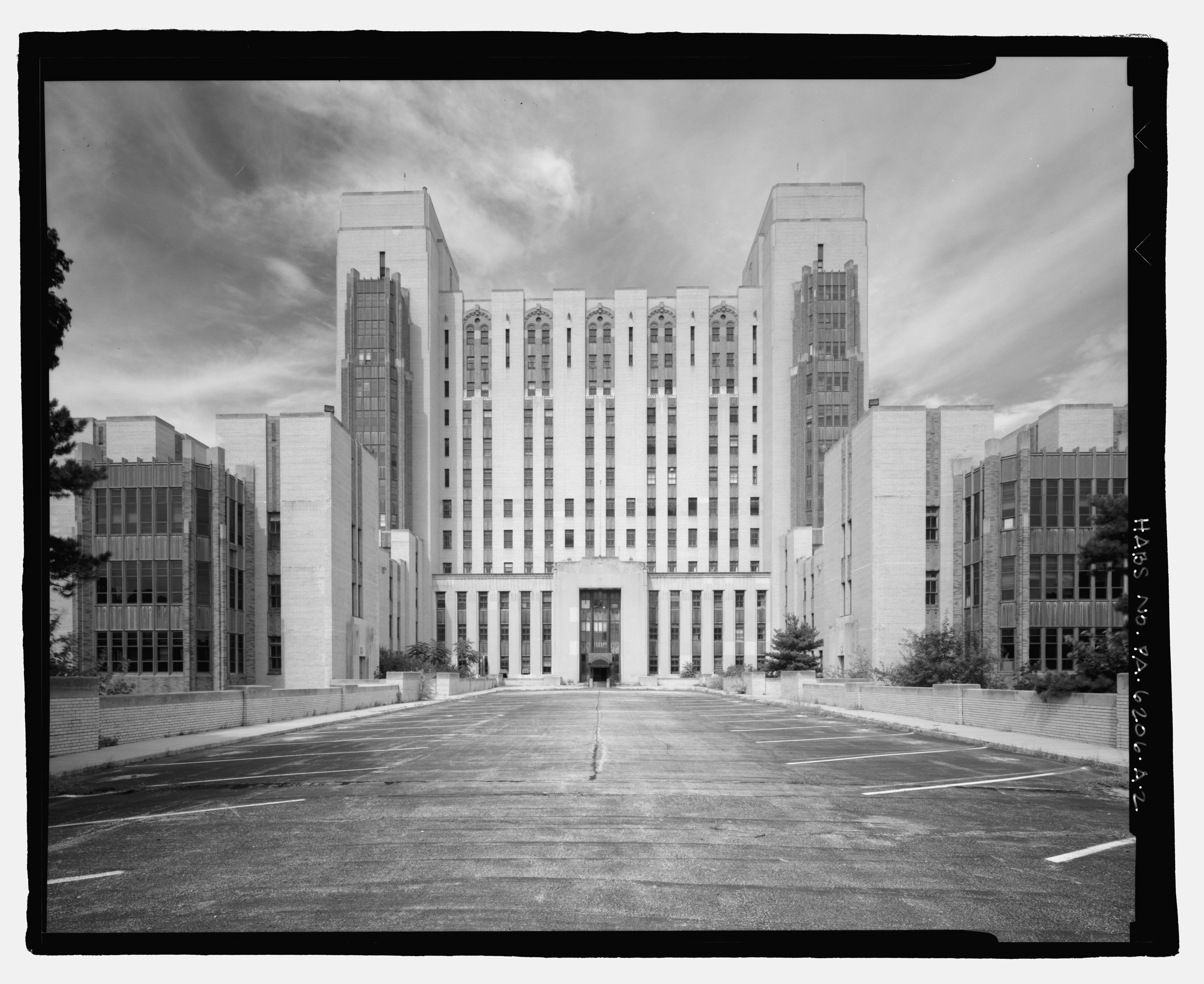
- Main Hospital Building, North end of Ramp A, north of Pattison Avenue, Philadelphia, Philadelphia County. Circa 1940s (HABS documentation photo: HABS PA-6206-A-2)

General information
- Architectural style: Art Deco
- Location: Entrance Pattison Avenue between South Broad and 20th Streets; Philadelphia, Pennsylvania
- Coordinates: 39°54′26″N 75°10′43″W
- Construction started: 1933
- Completed: 1935
- Demolished: 2001

Design and construction
- Architect: Karcher and Smith

The Philadelphia Naval Hospital was the first high-rise hospital building constructed by the United States Navy. At its 1935 opening it represented a state-of-the-art facility for the Navy with 650 beds and a total floor space of 352,000 square feet (32,700 m^{2}). The dedicated medical purpose of this facility contributed to the World War II mission as the center for amputation, orthopedic and prosthetic services for Navy, Marine, and Coast Guard veterans residing east of the Rocky Mountains.

The complex was developed as a tree-lined campus of 56 buildings and structures with the main high-rise building placed at the center and augmented with amenities of a Navy Base Exchange (BX) and gas station. The central building was flanked by lower buildings in a classical Beaux-Arts arrangement. It was a striking 15-story Art Deco steel-framed tower, faced with yellow brick and brown terra cotta and described in a survey of Philadelphia architecture as "one of the finest Art Deco buildings in the city." The height was a significant departure from the two- or three-story naval hospital complexes that preceded it. Detailing the building's interior included such significant features as anodized aluminum heater grates depicting a ship in full sail. The grates were set in marble panels in the vestibule and below were air intakes in the shape of dolphins.

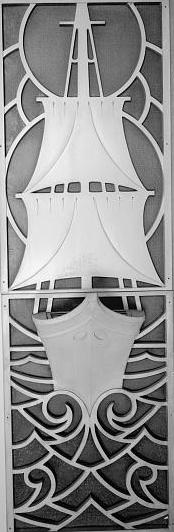
Interior sailing ship heater grate

By the late 1970s declining use of the facility and studies that determined the building incapable of being renovated for modern medical use signaled the end of the hospital's role as major medical facility for the Navy. In 1988, under the Base Realignment and Closure Act of 1988 (BRAC), the Philadelphia Naval Hospital was slated for closure and disposal. All functions were relocated from the complex in 1993, and since that date the buildings were vacant and overseen by a small security and maintenance staff. The city of Philadelphia was approved to purchase it for re-use. It was finally demolished on 9 June 2001 at 7:02 A.M.

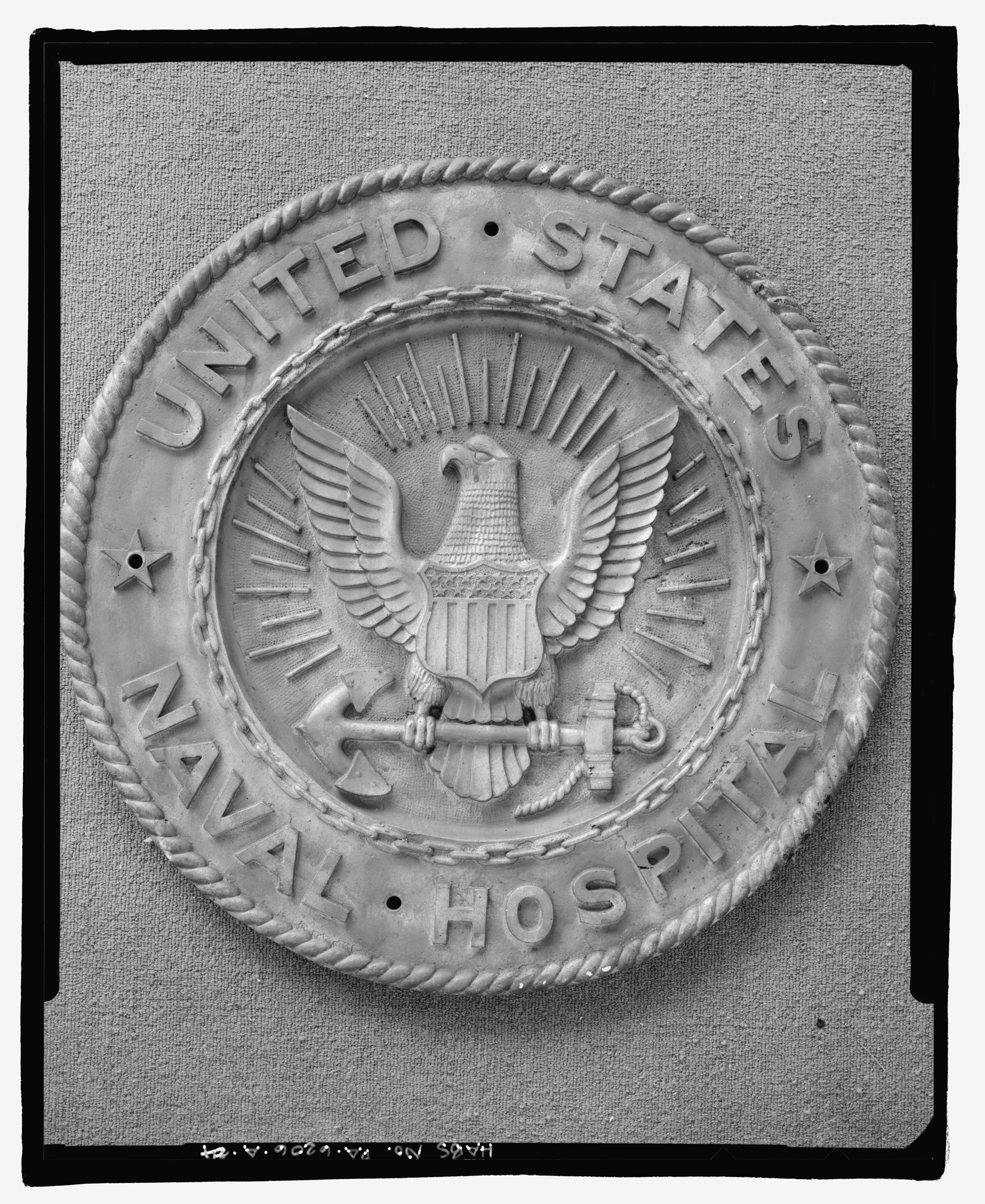
Seal of the United States Naval Hospital Philadelphia, Philadelphia County, Front Gate Insignia. PA HABS PA-6206-A-24

== Location ==
Naval Hospital Philadelphia was situated on 49 acres (20 ha) in the southern part of the City of Philadelphia. The property was oriented along the east–west axis with a rectangular border. The property was bounded on the north by Hartranft Street; on the east by Broad Street; on the south by Pattison Avenue; and on the west by 20th Street. There were residential neighborhoods of Packer Park north of the Naval Hospital property; a South Philadelphia Sports Complex east and southeast of the hospital campus; Franklin Delano Roosevelt Park south and southwest; and on the west side former Navy family residences known as Capehart Housing. Capehart was also vacated and became Navy surplus until purchased in 2003 by John Westrum and redeveloped on the same site plan and foundations to construct new market rate town home housing named the "Reserve at Packer Park."

== Remaining buildings ==
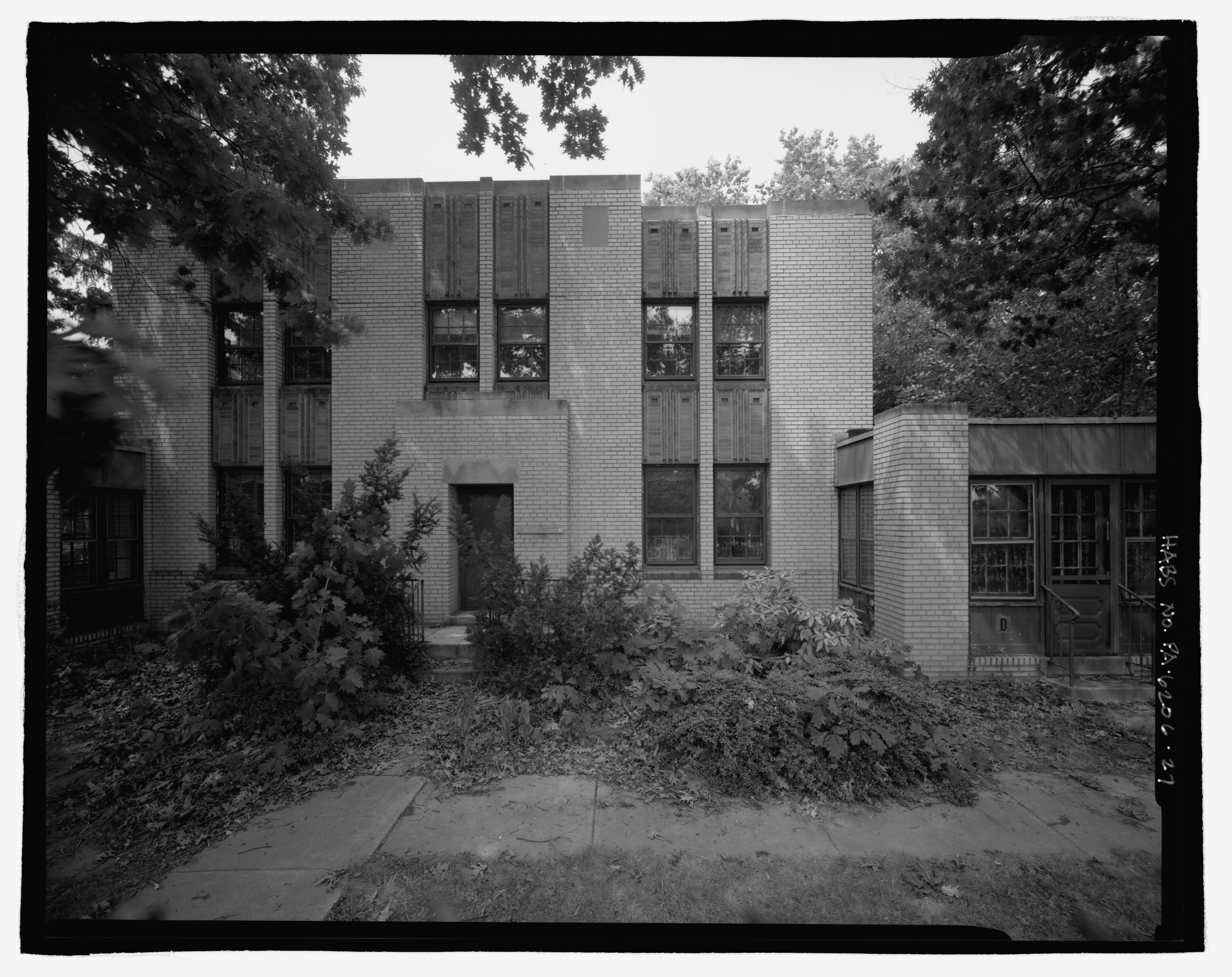
Executive Quarters Building D

Three two-story naval residential buildings facing along Pattison Avenue surrounded with landscaped gardens have been incorporated into the new use of the site as office buildings. These 1930s Naval Hospital buildings were consistent with the Art Deco architectural design in an institutional setting. The original use:

- Building A: Constructed to serve as living quarters for the Naval Hospital's commandant.
- Building B/C: Constructed as twin or duplex dwelling to serve as living quarters for the Naval Hospital's chief medical and surgical officers.
- Building D: Constructed to serve as the residence of the executive officer.

== See also ==
- Philadelphia Naval Shipyard
- Philadelphia Naval Asylum
- William P. C. Barton, Naval Surgeon of Philadelphia
