= Finiteness =

State of being limited or ended

Checkered flag used in auto racing to signal the end of a race

Finiteness, finitude, or being finite, is the state of being limited or having an end, and is a counter to the concept of infinity. Humans are considered to be in this state because of their limited life span, uniformly ending in death. Each natural number is considered to be in this state, because counting up to that number stops when the number is reached. The concept appears across disciplines, from mathematics and linguistics to philosophy, where it is used to describe quantities, structures, and conditions. In mathematics, a set or number is finite if it is limited in size, while in linguistics, a verb is finite if it is limited by grammatical features such as tense, person, and number, which definition allows it to stand alone as the main verb of a clause. Philosophers including Georg Wilhelm Friedrich Hegel, Martin Heidegger, and Jacques Derrida have explored finiteness as a fundamental feature of human existence, emphasizing how boundaries, endings, and mortality shape meaning and understanding.

== Etymology and symbolism ==
The term is derived from the Latin finitus, the past participle of finire ("to finish" or "to limit"), from finis ("end" or "boundary"). It entered the English language in the late Middle Ages through Old French and Middle English, initially referring to boundedness in space or quantity, and later acquiring broader abstract uses.

In mathematics, formulations like |A|<∞, or |[G:H]|<∞ can be used to indicate that a number is finite, or that the set of numbers within a range is finite. The Unicode character set includes the character ⧞ (the infinity symbol negated with a vertical bar), but this is not used in mathematical notation.

== Philosophical significance ==
Philosophy professor Patrick O'Connor, in his book, Derrida: Profanations, describes how 19th century-philosopher Georg Wilhelm Friedrich Hegel, and his 20th-century successors Martin Heidegger and Jacques Derrida, each approached the concept of finiteness from distinct philosophical perspectives, while expressing a shared concern with the limits of human understanding and existence. For Hegel, primarily as expressed in his Science of Logic, the world is an "aggregate of finitudes", meaning that everything consists of bounded, limited things and events. Hegel argues that finiteness itself is comprehensible only in relation to the infinite, which is the condition of possibility for finite existence. Eternity, for Hegel, is not a limitless extension of time but an ever-present "now" outside of before and after. Because the world and its manifestations have beginnings and endings, they cannot be self-sufficient; their very finitude implies an infinite totality, in which they participate. In grasping the world as a totality, the notion of a beginning disappears, revealing finitude as both necessary and incomplete. The finite, for Hegel, therefore points beyond itself and gains meaning only through its relation to an infinite whole.

Heidegger and Derrida developed Hegel's insights in different directions. Per O'Connor's account, Heidegger emphasized that human existence (which he calls Dasein) is always finite, bound to its historical situation and ultimately defined by its mortality. Rather than limiting meaning, this finitude makes meaning possible, as being-in-the-world is shaped by contingency, temporality, and the inevitability of death. Derrida, meanwhile, argues that finitude resists categorization. He asserts that defining the world merely as an aggregation of finite parts is insufficient, because the structure of the world is constituted by relations between finitudes rather than by the finitudes themselves. Derrida contends that every finite thing reaches its end, but then opens onto other finitudes, creating a dynamic field of limits and beginnings. For Derrida, finitude is not a static boundary but an ongoing process of delimitation, and it is this process of constant emergence and exposure of limits that underlies the possibility of meaning and the formation of the world.

== Mathematics and physics ==
Specification of finiteness is common when referring to sums in the state of finiteness, to distinguish them from those which are not. The term finite is used to specify finiteness of a sum, but so also is the term partial. A famous finite sum is the Riemann sum, named after Bernhard Riemann who used it to rigorously define the integral. In 1847, George Boole used lower case to denote finiteness in his essay on the mathematical analysis of logic. Boole called these lowercase letters elective symbols. A capital letter was used to represent a class and individuals belonging to the class. For example, X represents the class animals. Sometimes, the capital letter was written in the plural, Xs, referring specifically to individuals belonging to the class. Both X and Xs refer to members of the class separately, rather than collectively. The lowercase x refers collectively to selected individuals belonging to the class. Such an elective symbol denotes an elected, selected, collected whole. Today, the term finite set is used to refer to what Boole described as a collection of objects, and denoted with a lowercase letter.

In physics, the possible finiteness of things like time, space, and energy is a subject of continuing debate. For example, astrophysicist Joseph Silk has maintained that we will likely never know whether the universe is finite due to its ever-expanding nature. Some distances are so long that although finite their precise value is not important, and have been referred to as "effectively infinite". For example, when an object which diffracts optical waves is sufficiently distant, the diffraction pattern can be effectively modeled without considering the actual finite distance—see Fraunhofer diffraction.

== Linguistics and semantics ==
Grammatically, finiteness is a property of verbs that distinguishes forms capable of serving as the main verb of an independent clause from those that cannot. A verb is called finite when it is marked by specific grammatical features that bind it to a subject and to a context in time, reality, or discourse. This boundedness contrasts with non-finite forms, such as infinitives or participles, which lack such markers and therefore cannot serve as the core verb of a complete sentence on their own. As a grammatical concept, finiteness is used with some inconsistency, such that linguist Wolfgang Klein wrote that "the notion of finiteness is used by everybody and understood by nobody". The relatively limited system of inflectional morphology in English often obscures the central role of finite verbs. In other languages, finite verbs are the locus of much grammatical information. Depending on the language, finite verbs can inflect for grammatical categories such as gender, person, number, tense, aspect, mood, and voice. The first three categories represent agreement information that the finite verb gets from its subject (by way of subject–verb agreement). The rest situate the clause content according to time in relation to the speaker (tense), extent to which the action, occurrence, or state is complete (aspect), assessment of reality or desired reality (mood), and relation of the subject to the action or state (voice). Finite verbs play a particularly important role in syntactic analyses of sentence structure. In many phrase structure grammars for instance those that build on the X-bar schema, the finite verb is the head of the finite verb phrase and so it is the head of the entire sentence. Similarly, in dependency grammars, the finite verb is the root of the entire clause and so is the most prominent structural unit in the clause. That is illustrated by the following trees:

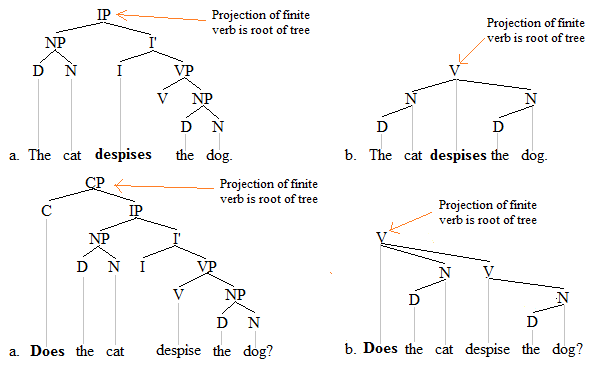

The phrase structure grammar trees are the a-trees on the left; they are similar to the trees produced in the government and binding framework. The b-trees on the right are the dependency grammar trees. Whether expressed through rich inflectional morphology or more limited marking as in the English language, finiteness constitutes a feature around which the syntax of the clause is organized.

== Technology and engineering ==
All computer programs are finite, in that the length of the program itself is limited. However, the amount of time required to execute a program may or may not be finite. An infinite loop is a sequence of instructions which when followed never leads to an end. For example: Step 1: print "999999999" and proceed to Step 2. Step 2: return to Step 1.

Finite-state machines are theoretical models of computation, and are used to design physical computing devices, such as CPUs. The states of a finite-state machine are analogous to values stored in the memory of a digital device. The machine begins in its initial state and then may transition to other states, one state at a time. In order to define the machine as a whole, each state must be specified. New states may not be added to the machine as a function of its operation. Some machines have a final or halting state, which if reached terminates operation of the machine. Since the machine is not subject to physical constraints, such as the need to dissipate heat, its operation is limited only by the theoretical constraint that it be in one and only one state at a time.

== See also ==
- Finality
- Finite (disambiguation)
- Infinity (disambiguation)
- Nonfinite (disambiguation)
