= Infiniti (disambiguation) =

Infiniti is a luxury car brand by Japanese automaker Nissan Motor Company.

Infiniti may also refer to:

- Infiniti (album), the debut album of Pakistani musician Salman Ahmad
- Infiniti Mall, a chain of shopping malls in India
- Infiniti Retail, a subsidiary of Tata Group; see Cromā
- Chase Infiniti (born 2000), American actress

== See also ==
- Infinity (disambiguation)
