= Chickie's & Pete's =

Sports bar in the Philadelphia metropolitan area

- Type: Private
- Industry: Restaurant
- Founded: 1977; 49 years ago
- Founder: Peter & Henrietta Ciarrocchi
- Headquarters: Philadelphia, Pennsylvania, U.S.
- Number of locations: 19 (as of August 14, 2017)
- Key people: Pete Ciarrocchi (president)
- Products: Crabs, lobster, seafood, American food, beer and liquor
- Services: Food and Beverage
- Revenue: Multi-million dollars (2011)
- Owner: Pete Ciarrocchi
- Website: chickiesandpetes.com

Chickie’s & Pete’s is an American bar and restaurant business privately owned and headquartered in Philadelphia, Pennsylvania. It started as a small privately owned neighborhood taproom in 1977, and created a brand name as a seafood crab house that expanded from a single location to multiple locations within the Philadelphia Metropolitan Area. In 2011, ESPN voted Chickie's & Pete's the number one sports bar in North America.

== History ==
Peter and Henrietta Ciarrocchi owned a deli, and in 1977, purchased a nearby small neighborhood taproom on Robbins Avenue in the Mayfair section of Northeast Philadelphia known as "Wally's". Peter made three changes by adding stools to the standing-only bar, lifting the “men only” rule, and naming the bar after himself and his wife, Henrietta, whom everyone called Chickie.

When Peter died in 1987, it was Chickie who encouraged Peter's son, Pete Junior, to run with his own business ideas, his spin on crab seasoned fries, and whatever else he wanted to try.. Ciarrocchi developed the Crabfries recipe beginning around 1977, spending roughly two years experimenting with leftover crab seasoning during the off-season when fresh crabs were unavailable. The result was a crinkle-cut french fry dusted with a proprietary blend of crab-boil spices and served with a warm white cheese sauce for dipping. Despite the name, Crabfries contain no crab meat. By 2008, Chickie's & Pete's had sold their five millionth order of Crabfries. The chain's expansion to Philadelphia International Airport, where it operates four locations, significantly broadened its national profile and made Crabfries a widely recognized symbol of Philadelphia food culture.. In 1998, Pete expanded the business by purchasing a run-down vacant supermarket building near Veterans Stadium within the Sports Complex Special Services District in Packer Park in South Philadelphia to build upon the sports bar concept by locating near Philadelphia's sport venues.

In February 2016, Herr's released Chickie's & Pete's Crabfries seasoned potato chips.

== Lawsuits ==
Chickie’s and Pete’s trademarked the phrase “crab fries” in 2007. The owner of the company, Pete Ciarrocchi, has been “passionate about defending that trademark.”

A federal lawsuit was filed in U.S. District Court in Philadelphia on Oct. 27, 2011, alleging that New York J & P Pizza in Westminster, Maryland was guilty of trademark infringement and unfair competition due to their use of the term "crab fries" on a 2007 online menu. A similar lawsuit was filed, also in 2011, against Crabby Fries in Kill Devil Hills, North Carolina. Other restaurants, including Sidecar Bar & Grille in Philadelphia and another restaurant in Maryland, have voluntarily removed the offending terms rather than face a lawsuit.

Not every restaurant has agreed to discontinue their usage of this phrase. Crabby Fries is fighting the lawsuit threat by noting that they are 400 miles from Chickie's & Pete's primary market, and arguing that the terms 'crab' and 'fries' are too generic to be trademarked. In August 2012, during an out of court settlement through a mediator, Crabby Fries agreed to take "crabby fries” off their menu, but will operate under the name Crabby Fries for an undisclosed amount of time.

In February 2014, Chickie's & Pete's agreed to pay $8.5 million to settle both a Labor Department investigation and a lawsuit brought by current and former employees alleging wage and labor law violations. Ciarrocchi said that he agreed to the massive settlement because "it was the right thing to do".

== Locations ==
As of 2023, Chickie & Pete's maintains seven locations in Philadelphia and its Pennsylvania and South Jersey suburbs, including:

- Bordentown at 183 U.S. Route 130, Bordentown, New Jersey
- Egg Harbor at 6055 E. Black Horse Pike, Egg Harbor Township, New Jersey
- Parx Casino at 2999 Street Road, Bensalem Township, Pennsylvania
- Robbins Avenue at 4010 Robbins Avenue, Philadelphia
- Roosevelt Boulevard at 11000 Roosevelt Boulevard, Philadelphia
- Tropicana Casino at 2831 Boardwalk, Atlantic City, New Jersey
- South Philadelphia at Lincoln Financial Field, 1526 Packer Avenue, South Philadelphia

== Miscellaneous ==
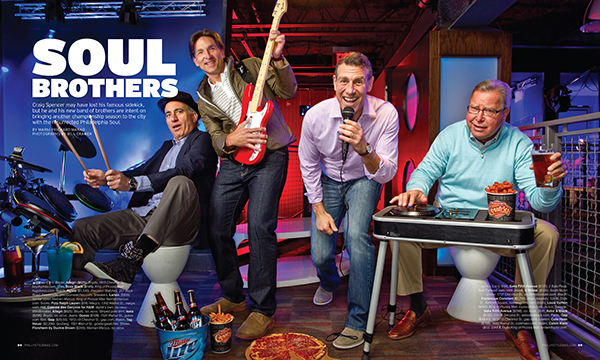
Cosmo DeNicola, Craig Spencer, Pete Ciarrocchi, Ron Jaworski in 2011

In 2011, Pete Jr. became part-owner of the Philadelphia Soul arena football team.
