= Infinity (disambiguation) =

Infinity (symbol: $\infty$) is a mathematical concept that is involved in almost all branches of mathematics, and used in many scientific and non-scientific areas.

Infinity or infinities may also refer to:

== Buildings ==
- The Infinity, a highrise condo in San Francisco, California, US
- Infinity Tower (Dubai), former name of the Cayan Tower skyscraper in Dubai, UAE
- Infinity Tower (Brisbane), a skyscraper in Australia
- Infinity Tower, a skyscraper under construction in the New Administrative Capital, Cairo, Egypt
- Tower Infinity, a skyscraper in Korea

== Businesses and organizations ==
- Infinity Broadcasting Corporation, now known as CBS Radio, one of the largest radio corporations in the US
- Infinity Systems, a manufacturer of loudspeakers
- Infinity Power Chutes, an American aircraft manufacturer

== Mathematics and philosophy ==
- Infinity (philosophy), an abstract philosophical and metaphysical concept
- Infinity symbol $\infty$
- Aleph number, symbols for representing different kinds of mathematical infinity
- Axiom of infinity
- Actual infinity

== Media and entertainment ==
=== Film and television ===
- Infinity (1996 film), a biographical film starring Matthew Broderick as physicist Richard Feynman
- Infinity (2023 film), an Indian Tamil-language film
- Mediaset Infinity (Italy), an Italian video streaming service
  - Infinity+ (Italy), formerly Infinity TV
- Mediaset Infinity (Spain), a Spanish video streaming service

=== Games ===
- Infinity (role-playing game), a tabletop role-playing game
- Infinity (wargame), a science fiction 28mm miniature skirmish game
- Infinity (video game series), a series of visual novel games produced by KID
  - Never 7: The End of Infinity, which was originally released as Infinity
- Disney Infinity, a toys-to-life video game series
  - Disney Infinity (video game), the first game in the series

=== Literature ===
- Infinity Science Fiction, a science fiction magazine
- Infinity (comic book), a crossover comic book published by Marvel Comics in 2013
- Infinity Comics, a digital comics lineup exclusive to Marvel Unlimited which feature the vertical scroll format
- Infinity, Inc., a team of superheroes appearing in comic books published by DC Comics
- Star Wars Infinities, a 2002-2004 Star Wars comic book published by Dark Horse Comics
- The Infinities, a 2009 novel by John Banville
- The Infinite, a 1990 book by the philosopher Adrian William Moore

=== Music ===
==== Albums ====
- Infinity (Charice album), 2011
- Infinity (Crematory album)
- Infinity (Deep Obsession album), 1999
- Infinity (Devin Townsend album), 1998
- Infinity (End of Green album), the debut album of German alternative metal band End Of Green
- Infinity (f.i.r. album)
- Infinity (Future album), TBA
- Infinity (Guru Josh album), the debut album by English acid house musician Guru Josh
- Infinity (Jesu album), 2009
- Infinity (John Coltrane album), 1972
- Infinity (Journey album), 1978
- Infinity (K-Space album), 2008
- Infinity (Lee Morgan album), 1981
- Infinity (McCoy Tyner album), 1995
- Infinity (Oscar and the Wolf album)
- Infinity (Plavi orkestar album), 1999
- Infinity (Shtar album), the debut studio album by Jewish hip hop band Shtar
- Infinity, by Scarlxrd, 2019
- Infinity (Tom Harrell album), 2019
- Infinity, by Trout Fishing in America
- Infinity (Vivid album), 2012
- Infinity (Yann Tiersen album), 2014
- Infinity (Emi Tawata EP), 2008
- Infinity (AJR EP), 2014
- Infinity (Against the Current EP), 2014
- #1 to Infinity, a 2015 compilation by Mariah Carey

==== Songs ====
- "Infinity" (Girl Next Door song), 2009
- "Infinity" (Guru Josh song), 1989
- "Infinity" (Infinity Ink song), 2012
- "Infinity" (Mariah Carey song), 2015
- "Infinity" (Megumi Hayashibara song), 1998
- "Infinity" (One Direction song), 2015
- "Infinity" (Jaymes Young song), 2017
- "Infinity", by AJR from their 2015 album Living Room
- "Infinity", by Akai Haato, 2023
- "Infinity", by Amaranthe from The Nexus, 2013
- "Infinity", by Galneryus from Angel of Salvation, 2012
- "Infinity", by Hawkwind from PXR5, 1979
- "Infinity", by Mohombi, 2016
- "Infinity", by Paris Hilton from Infinite Icon, 2024
- "Infinity", by Primal Fear from Metal Commando, 2020
- "Infinity", by Stratovarius from Infinite, 2000
- "Infinity", by Queens of the Stone Age from the 2000 soundtrack for Heavy Metal 2000

==== Other uses in music ====
- Infinity Recordings, a British record label
- Infinity Records, a short-lived American record label from the 1970s
- Infinity (band), a Eurodance band from Norway
- Infinity (producer) (born 1983), American record producer

=== In other media ===
- Infinity (de Rivera), a 1967 sculpture by Jose de Rivera
- Infinity Broadcasting Corporation, now known as CBS Radio, one of the largest radio corporations in the US

== Technology ==
- BT Infinity, a broadband service in the UK provided by BT Retail
- GTS Infinity, a celebrity Millennium-Class cruise ship
- Infinity Firearms, a brand name of Strayer Voight Inc, manufacturer of M1911-styled pistols
- Infinity Engine, a game engine used in several popular computer role-playing games
- U-Turn Infinity, a German paraglider design

== Vessels ==
- Cloud 9 (yacht), delivered in 2015 as Infinity
- Infinity (2022 yacht), a replacement for the above yacht

== See also ==
- Infinity sign (disambiguation)
- Infiniti (disambiguation)
- Infini (disambiguation)
- Infinite (disambiguation)
- Lemniscate (disambiguation)
