= FDR Skatepark =

Prominent Philadelphia skate park

Coordinates: 39.898541°N 75.179563°W

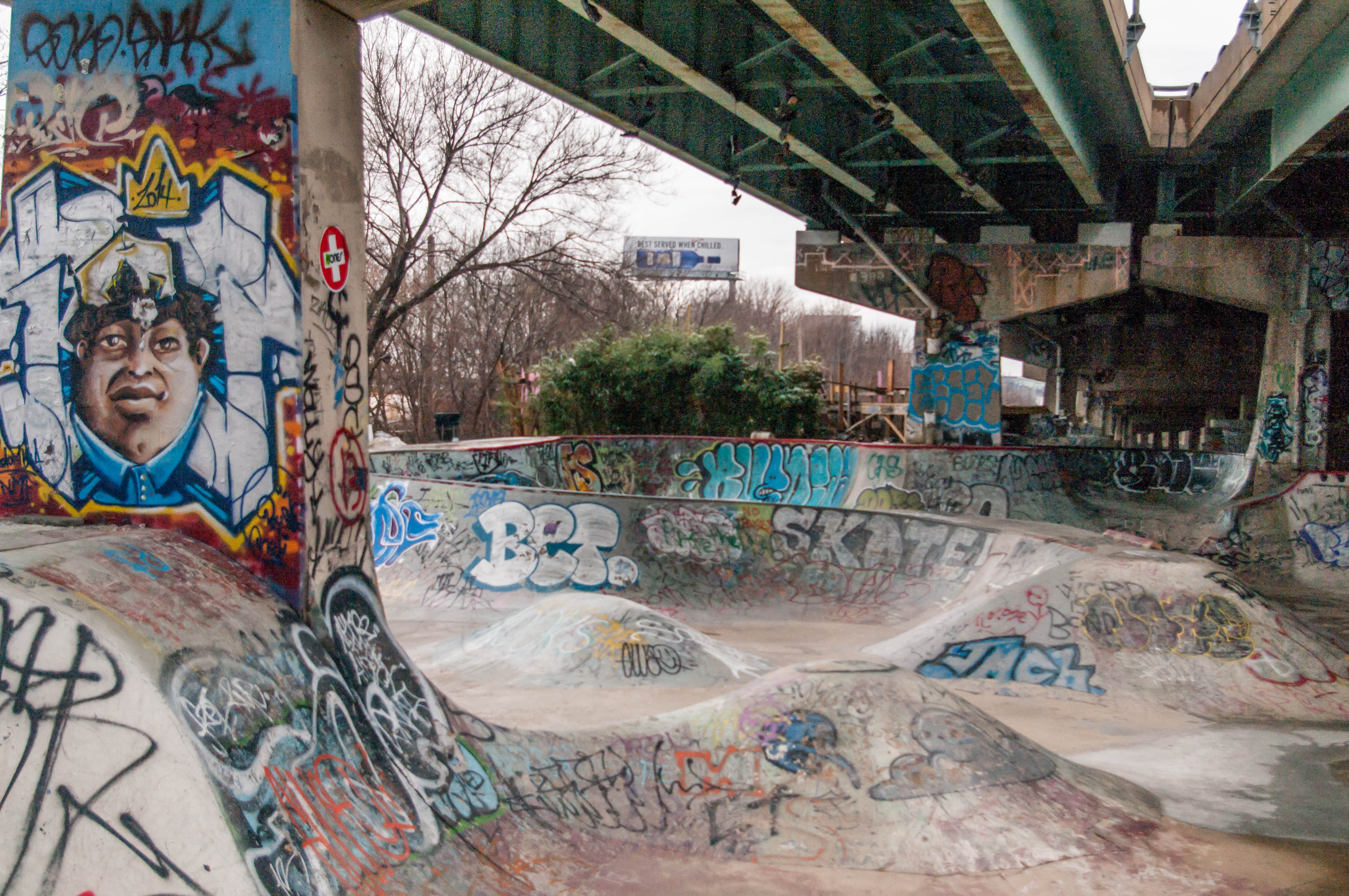
The FDR Skatepark in 2014

FDR Skatepark (formerly known as "Phillyside") is a skatepark located in Philadelphia, Pennsylvania, United States. It is accessible from the NRG Station stop of the Broad Street subway line. The park has long been popular with notable local skaters such as Willy Akers, Chuck Treece, Bam Margera, Kerry Getz and various other local pro skaters. The park was built on unused public land in Franklin Delano Roosevelt Park beneath an overpass of Interstate 95. The park came to be through volunteer labor and donations of materials. Over time the park has expanded with additions and inclusions to the area around the original components of the park.

The park was born because Philadelphia’s government wanted to put a stop to skateboarding at Love Park. Their solution was to set aside 16,000 square feet of real estate beneath the highway. City Hall thought this was going to be enough to solve the problems caused by skaters in the city, but after about a year, the locals got restless. With inspiration from Burnside and tired of waiting on the City, the people took matters into their own hands and started building a transition up a support pole, a corner bowl, and a mogul or two between that.

In 2019, Philly officials released that they had created a new, $200 million plan to turn the FDR skatepark into an ‘urban oasis.’ The plan brings new amenities and things that will draw more visitors to the area. Feedback that was given by the community mentioned that people of South Philly, and FDR skatepark users love opportunities to connect with nature and safe walking and biking trails. New additions to the park include elevated boardwalks, an expansion on the Shed Brook Creek so visitors can kayak, The Franklin 5k— a 3.1 mile trail, a “great lawn,” and the completion of the field. This plan was created after the infrastructure of the park was damaged from years of flooding.

== Features ==
Created by skaters, for skaters, it is considered within the skateboarding community to be an excellent park with endless speed lines. The park has several "areas", including the core park that lies under the aforementioned overpass, the neighboring and connecting pool section, and a mini ramp and vert ramp. South Philadelphia's FDR Skate Park has been described by professionals and in magazine articles such as Thrasher and Skateboarder to be a concrete, skateboard 'paradise', as it was designed and built by skateboard enthusiasts. The original core of the park includes features like the "Bunker," a 60-foot-long (18 m); the "Dome," a 4-foot (1.2 m) wall of concrete that climbs up into a burly overhang11-foot (3.4 m) next to the Bunker with brick coping and provides privacy from the road; a 6 ft patch of humps called the "Amoeba", this park provides a challenge for skaters of all skill levels, even professionals. As mentioned the park is situated right under the I-95 highway overpass, right off Broad Street, so it is protected from rain and snow.

== Popularity ==
Props Road Fools 3 (1999) rode here on "Day 4" of the trip. FDR played host to the Gravity Games in 2005. The park is featured in several games of the Tony Hawk's franchise, such as Pro Skater 2, Underground 2, Proving Ground and Pro Skater 1 + 2. The park has been featured in countless skate videos since the mid-1990s, including Transworld IE and Toy Machine's Jump Off A Building. It is featured in hundreds of skateboard and videos on YouTube, through contests, and every day footage.
