= Infini (disambiguation) =

Infini is a 2015 science fiction film.

Infini may also refer to:

- Infini (album), Voivod album
- Infini (CRS), a Japanese computer reservations system

== See also ==
- Infinity (disambiguation)
- Ẽfini, brand of Japanese car producer Mazda
