= Packer Park, Philadelphia =

Packer Park
- Community area
- Packer Park
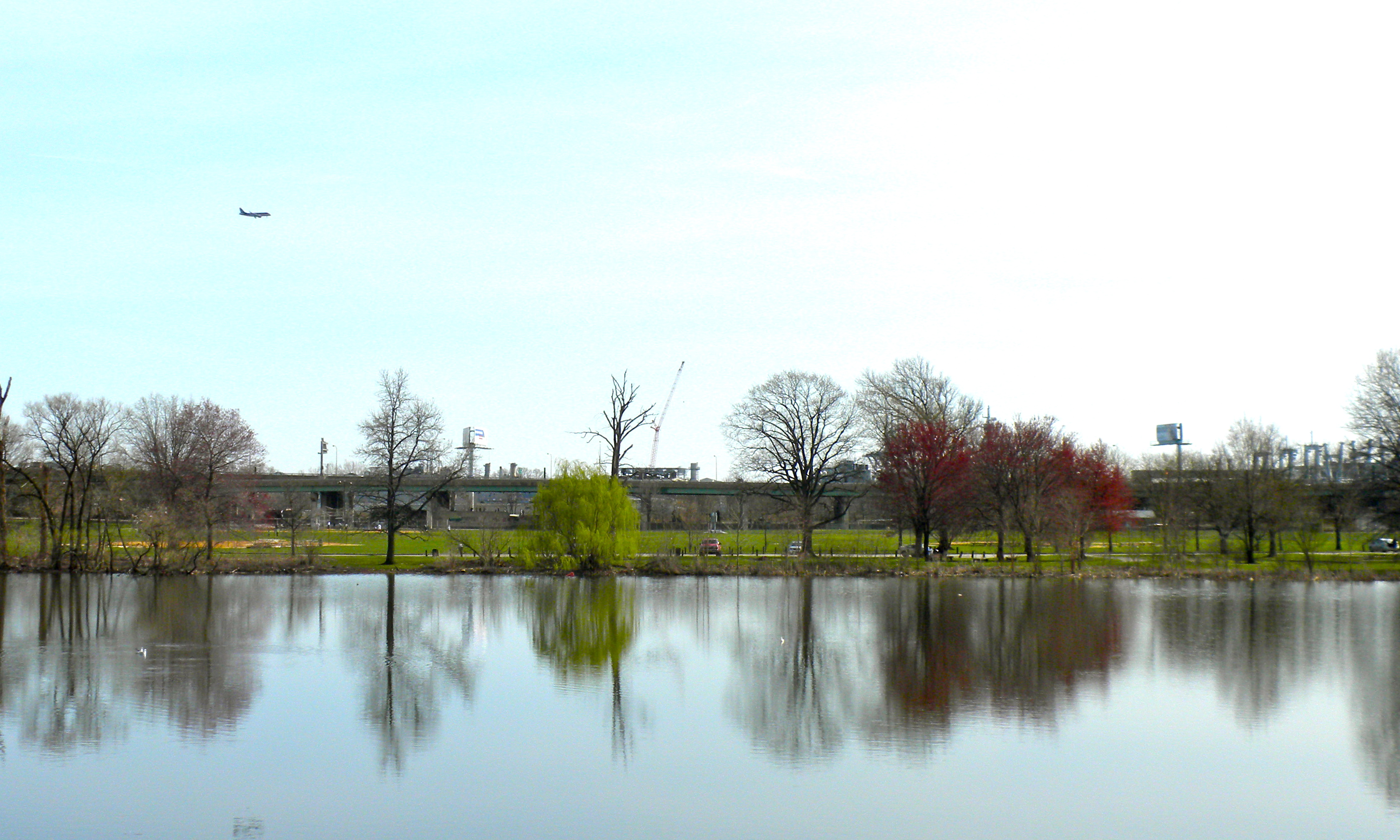
- Meadow Lake with baseball fields behind it. Interstate 95 borders the park, with the Philadelphia Naval Shipyard behind it. Above an airplane begins its landing at Philadelphia International Airport.

- Location within Philadelphia
- Coordinates: 39.9088°N 75.1782°W
- Country: United States
- State: Pennsylvania
- County: Philadelphia
- City: Philadelphia
- Neighborhoods: list: Packer Park, Philadelphia

Area
  - Total: 2.01 sq mi (5.21 km^{2})
- Elevation: 20 ft (6.1 m)

Demographics
- Time zone: UTC-5 (EST)
  - Summer (DST): UTC-4 (EDT)
- Zip Codes: parts of 19145

Packer Park is a neighborhood in the South Philadelphia section of Philadelphia, Pennsylvania, United States that originally included 1,000 homes built in two unique builder developments, of Packer Park in the 1950s and Brinton Estates during the 1990s. It is now one of four residential communities to be designated as Packer Park. The original footprint community is also one of four adjacent communities that form Philadelphia's Sports Complex Special Services District. The approximate boundaries are Packer Avenue to the north, Hartranft Street to the south including FDR Park farther south, Broad Street to the east known as the Southern Parkway, and I-76 to the far west. Packer Park has been considered home to one of the most organized community groups in the South Philadelphia region.

== Overview ==
The area was a section of Passyunk Township, a defunct township that was located in Philadelphia County and originally occupied by settlers from New Sweden. The township ceased to exist and was incorporated into the City of Philadelphia following the passage of the Act of Consolidation, 1854. The American Swedish Historical Museum located in Franklin Delano Roosevelt Park on the southern border of the Packer Park community memorializes the Swedish ethnic history.

To the immediate east is the South Philadelphia sports complex consisting of Citizens Bank Park, Lincoln Financial Field, Xfinity Mobile Arena, and the dining complex of Stateside Live!. This was also the former site of now demolished Veterans Stadium, the Spectrum and John F. Kennedy Stadium.

== Packer Park ==
Packer Avenue itself was named in honor of William Fisher Packer, a former governor of Pennsylvania, and was built as an approach to the American International exposition grounds of the Sesquicentennial Exposition of 1926. Following 1926, the exposition was demolished and the US Navy built temporary housing on the site. The Navy abandoned the site and moved families to new housing west of Penrose Avenue. This opened up the site to the private development of Packer Park on what was reclaimed swampy land and preserved the vitality of the borders of Broad Street's Southern Blvd, together with the Olmsted Brothers architecturally designed landscaped FDR Park on the south and Marconi Plaza, Philadelphia, Pennsylvania Park on the upper north. FDR Park is 348 acres (1.41 km2) which include a 146-acre (0.59 km2) golf course, about 125 acres (0.51 km2) of buildings and managed landscapes, and about 77 acres (310,000 m2) of natural lands including ponds and lagoons. Also on the south side from Packer Avenue to Hartranft Street is the Philadelphia Eagles Football Practice Field, Novacare Center, and Vendemmia Square maintaining large green areas from the site of the former U.S. Naval Hospital. Along the six blocks from Broad Street to 20th on Hartranft Street is a landscaped pedestrian walkway park lined with trees and seasonal plants, nicknamed the "Gladway" (memorializing the 1926 Sesquicentennial Exposition green area of rows of hundreds of Gladiolus).

The Packer Park urban townhouses distinguish themselves in South Philadelphia by departing from the Philadelphia grid of streets and blocks of dense rowhouses. This included culs-de-sac that were designed with a greater emphasis on a green park setting with common green spaces and accommodation for driveways and off street car parking. The community soon became populated by a large third-generation Italian and Italian Americans.

== Geary Estates ==
10 townhomes were built on the block of 1900 Geary Street at the site of the former Holy Spirit convent.

== West (The Reserve) ==
The Packer Park community name expanded in 2003–2007 adjacent to the original footprint became known as the "Reserve" at Packer Park, a separate housing development of 230 homes built on a triangular land area to the west of 20th Street, north of Pattison, east of Penrose Avenue. The Reserve was built on what was formerly a United States naval housing site, built in 1962 and abandoned in 1995 after the Cold War. The Capehart property, a designated ACT II site, housed nearly 400 naval families in two-story townhouse structures separated using a cul-del-sac street design. Upon the Military Base Closing Act in 1995, the United States government deeded the 27 1/2-acre Brownfield property to the city of Philadelphia. New luxury townhouses were built on the site by a private developer, John Westrum and Real Estate agent, daughter of the original Packer Park developer, Barbara Capozzi, who styled these homes for families. The colonial-styled architecture incorporated the "green technology" of environmentally adaptive re-use of existing piles and foundations, infrastructure, and materials previously built by the Navy. The existing street layout preserved green areas augmented with large back yards, open area pocket parks and tot lots. The streets and cul-de-sacs were renamed to memorialize sections of Italy to reflect the Italian-American population.

== West (Siena Place) ==
The Packer Park community expanded in 2008 with the groundbreaking of a new townhouse community composed of 313 townhomes named Siena Place. The development is set on a 30-acre land parcel in South Philadelphia and uses the Packer Park neighborhood name in its marketing program. The community is home to several prominent Philadelphia professional athletes, including members of the Eagles, Phillies, Flyers and Wings because of the convenience and security the neighborhood offers.

== East (Stella Maris Homes) ==
The Packer Park community name extended for a separate 1950s development of about 500 homes, commonly associated with the "Stella Maris" parish housing on 13th street for the priest and nuns until the buildings were completed on 10th and Bigler Street. Thereafter, the area took on the name of the 1960s Stadium built on vacant land to the south border and later demolished to make way for a baseball stadium and known as Veterans Stadium Homes. located west of Broad Street from Packer Avenue south to Geary Street and bordering the expansive parking lots of the Baseball Stadium. The parking lot border includes a large raised buffered zone of green space with dense trees and grass.

== South (Franklin Delano Roosevelt Park) ==
Franklin Delano Roosevelt Park was established in the late 1800s. It was originally named League Island Park and locally became known as the "Lakes", is an aesthetically landscaped designed park by the famous park architects Olmsted Brothers known for New York's Central Park. In 1948, it was renamed FDR Park, defined as located along the Delaware River in the southernmost point of South Philadelphia, comprising some 348 acres (1.41 km^{2}) which includes a 146-acre (0.59 km^{2}) golf course, approximately 125 acres (0.51 km^{2}) of buildings, roadways, pathways for walking, landscaped architecture, and a variety of picnic and recreation areas placed within about 77 acres (310,000 m^{2}) of natural lands including ponds and lagoons.

== Education ==
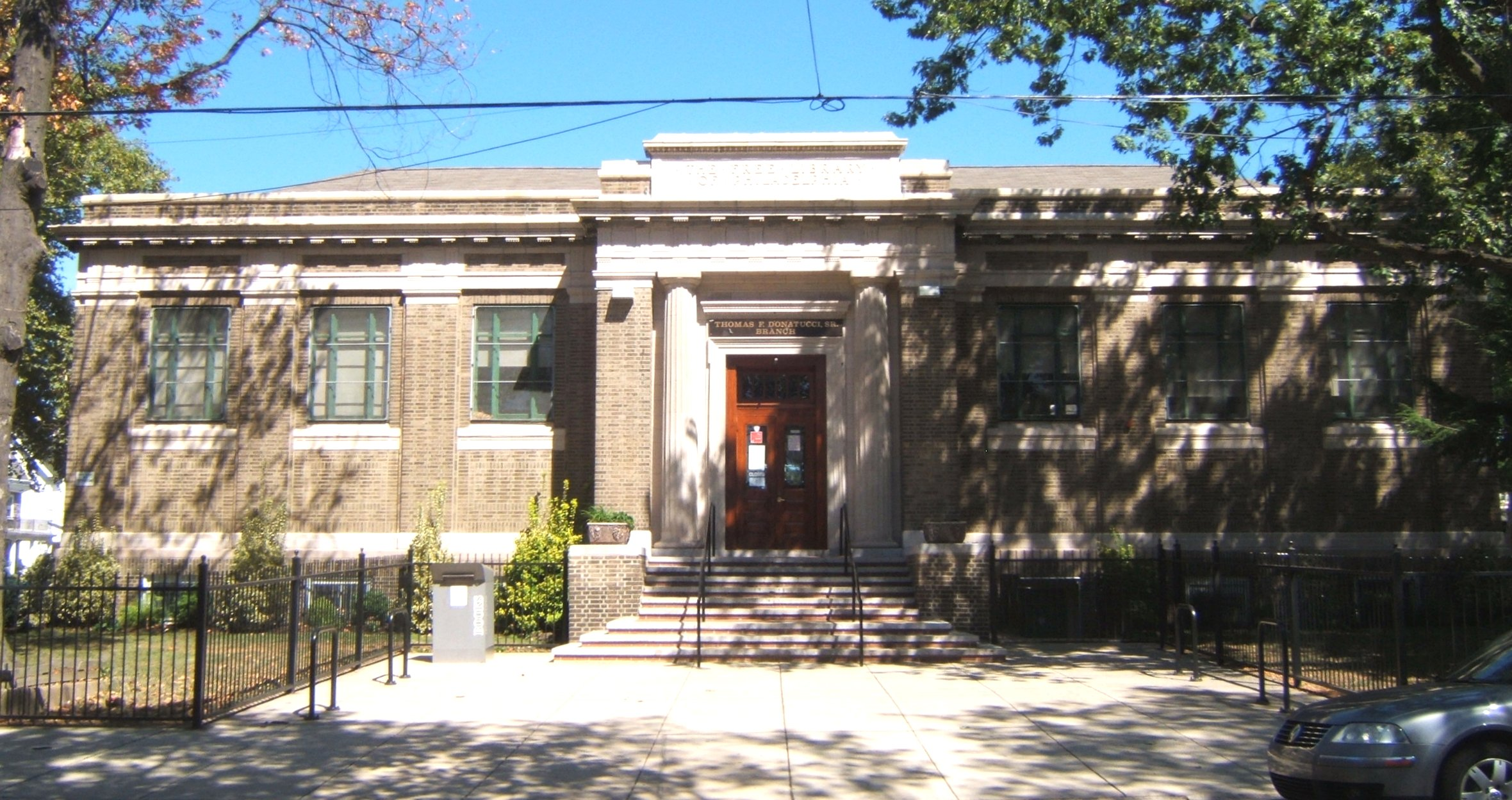
Donatucci Branch

The School District of Philadelphia operates public schools.

The Free Library of Philadelphia Thomas F. Donatucci, Sr. Branch (formerly the Passyunk Branch) serves Packer Park. The library received its current name in 2004.

== See also ==
- Aquarama Aquarium Theater of the Sea
- Naval Hospital Philadelphia
- Sesquicentennial Exposition
- FDR Park
