= Finite number =

Finite number may refer to:

- Natural number, a countable number less than infinity, being the cardinality of a finite set
- Real number, such as may result from a measurement (of time, length, area, etc.)
- In mathematical parlance, a value other than infinite or infinitesimal values and distinct from the value 0, see List of mathematical jargon#finite

== See also ==
- Finite (disambiguation)
