= Nonfinite =

Nonfinite is the opposite of finite

- a nonfinite verb is a verb that is not capable of serving as the main verb in an independent clause
- a non-finite clause is a clause whose main verb is non-finite

== See also ==
- Infinite (disambiguation)
