= Infinity sign (disambiguation) =

The infinity sign or infinity symbol is commonly typed as $\infty$, ∞ or ∞.

Infinity sign may also refer to

- Infinity Sign, a 2018 posthumous compilation album of music by Stephen Huss
- "Infinity Sign" (stylised as ""), a song by Coldplay from their 2021 album Music of the Spheres
- "∞", a song by Aphrodite's Child from their 1972 album 666

== See also ==
- Infinity (disambiguation)
