= Finite part =

Finite part may refer to:

- Cauchy principal value
- Hadamard finite part
