= Finite type =

Finite type refers to several related concepts in mathematics:

- Algebra of finite type, an associative algebra with finitely many generators
  - Morphism of finite type, a morphism of schemes with underlying morphisms on affine opens given by algebras of finite type
  - Scheme of finite type, a scheme over a field with a structure morphism of finite type
- Coxeter group of finite type, a Coxeter group whose Schläfli matrix has only positive eigenvalues
  - Coxeter matrix of finite type, a Coxeter matrix whose associated Schläfli matrix has only positive eigenvalues
  - Artin group of finite type, an Artin group arising as the finite Coxeter group of a Coxeter matrix of finite type
- Finite type invariant, a knot invariant that vanishes on knots with finitely many singularities
- Subshift of finite type, a shift space in symbolic dynamics
