= Franklin Delano Roosevelt Park =

Public park in Philadelphia, Pennsylvania

Coordinates: 39.902°N 75.184°W

Franklin Delano Roosevelt
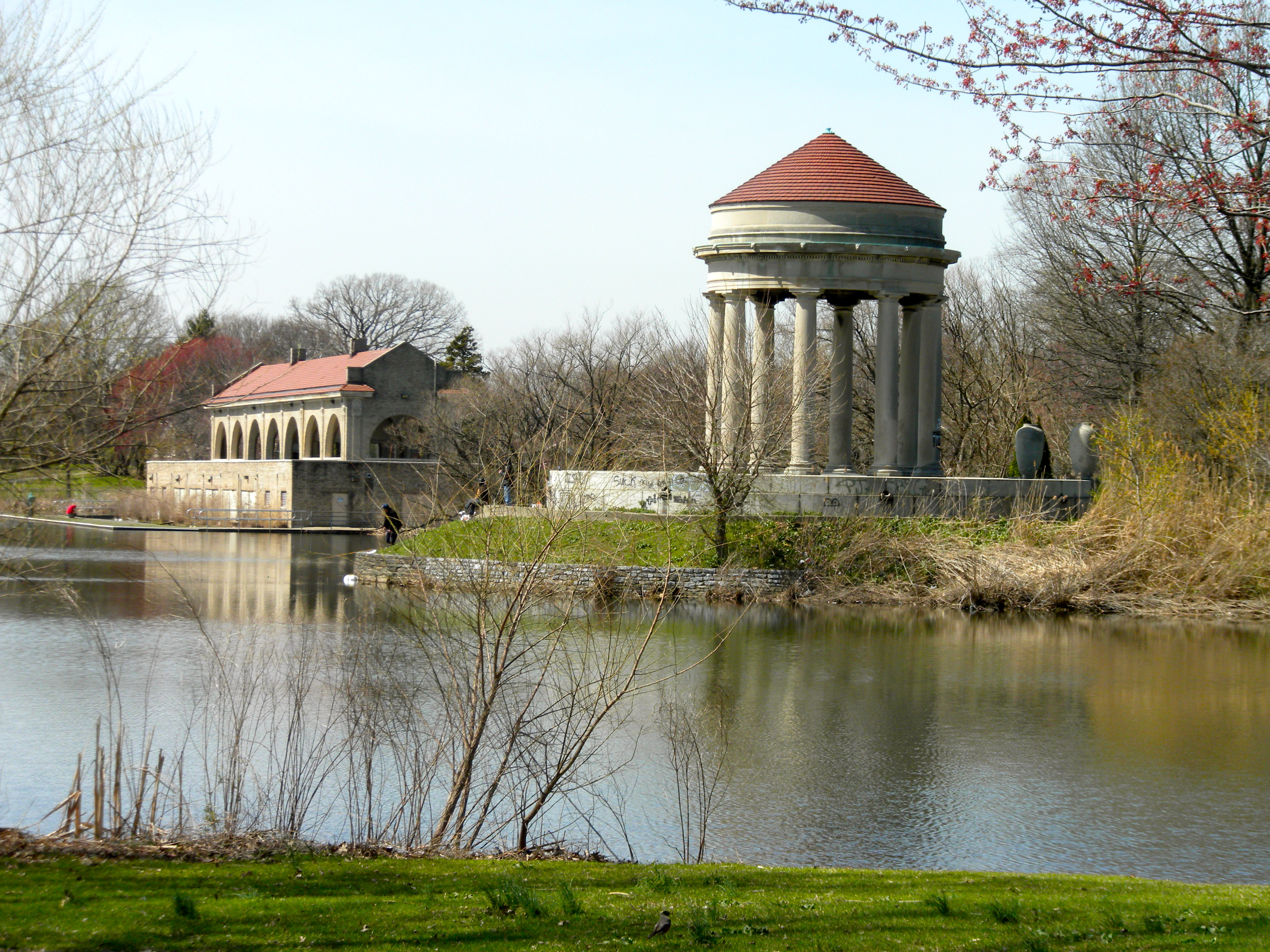
- Franklin Delano Roosevelt Park in March 2010
- Interactive map of Franklin Delano Roosevelt
- Type: Urban park
- Location: Philadelphia, Pennsylvania, U.S.
- Area: 348 acres (141 ha)
- Created: 1914
- Operator: Philadelphia Parks & Recreation
- Visitors: 120,000
- Open: All year
- Website: www.fdrpark.org

Philadelphia Register of Historic Places
- Designated: August 9, 2000

Franklin Delano Roosevelt (FDR) Park (originally named League Island Park) is a park located along the Delaware River in the southernmost point of South Philadelphia, Pennsylvania, comprising some 348 acres (1.41 km^{2}), about 125 acres (0.51 km^{2}) of buildings, roadways, pathways for walking, landscaped architecture, and a variety of picnic and recreation areas placed within about 77 acres (310,000 m^{2}) of natural lands including ponds and lagoons.

== Location ==
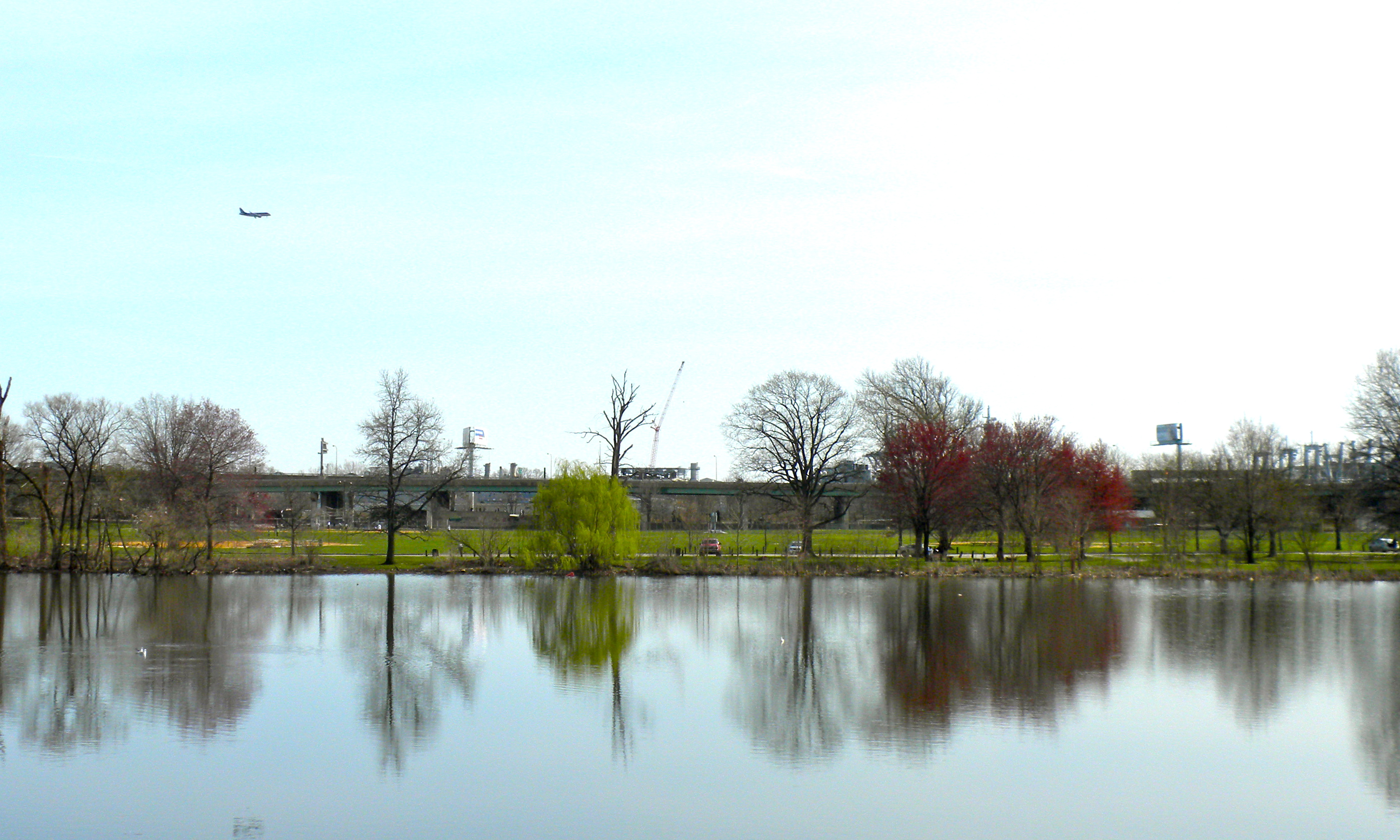
Meadow Lake with baseball fields behind it. Interstate 95 borders the park, with the Philadelphia Naval Shipyard behind it. Above an airplane begins its landing at Philadelphia International Airport.

The park is bordered by the South Philadelphia Sports Complex on South Broad Street, Interstate 95/Philadelphia Naval Yard and Pattison Avenue/Packer Park residential neighborhood. Many Philadelphians enjoy it as a green oasis for a variety of recreational activities, while sport and entertainment event patrons attending games and events at the nearby stadium may use it as an alternative place for offsite parking.

== History ==
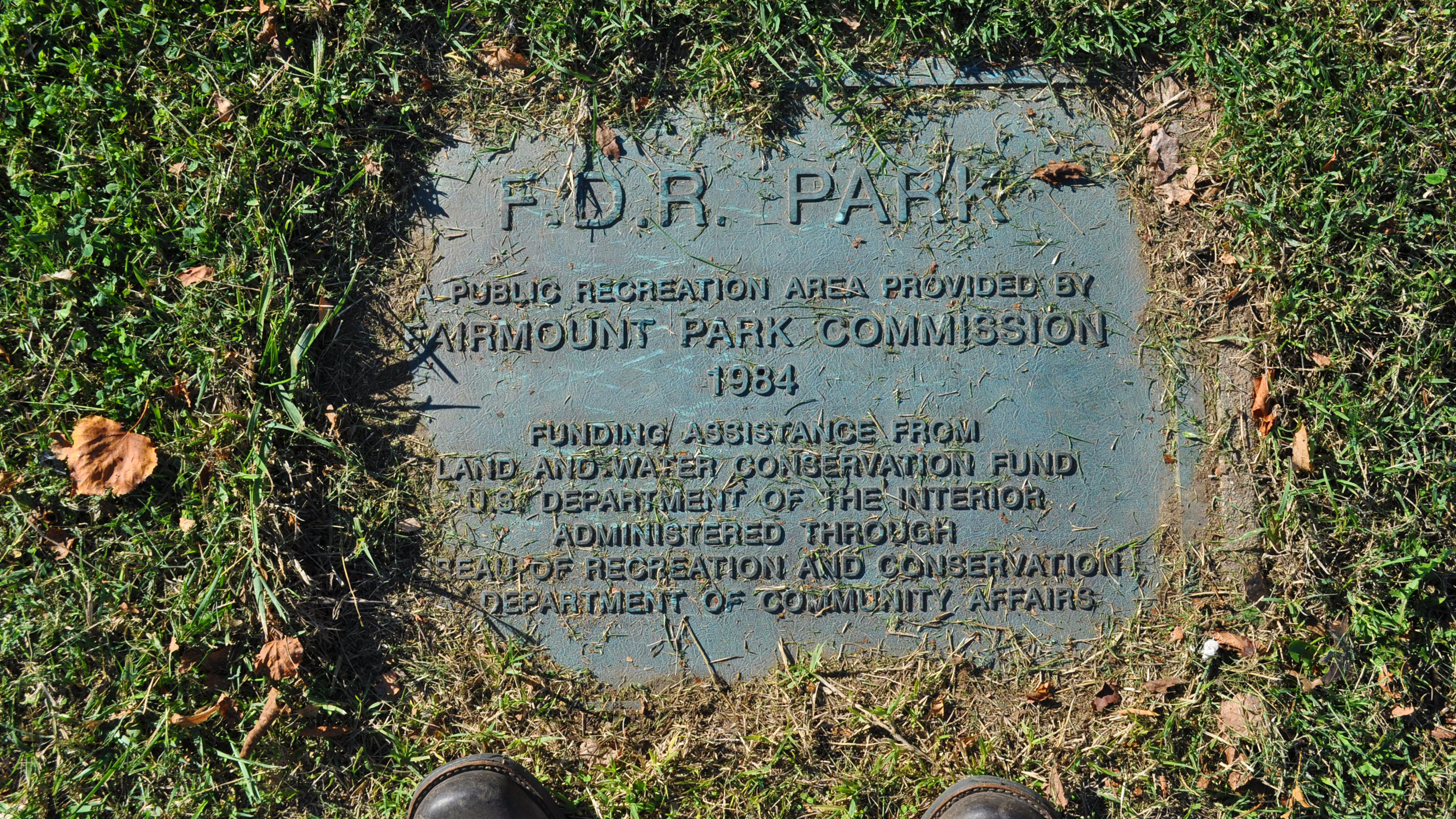
F.D.R. Park - Public recreation area provided by Fairmount Park Commission - 1984 - Funding Assistance from Land and Water Conservation Fund, U.S. Department of the Interior, Administered through Bureau of Recreation and Conservation, Department of Community Affairs

The park was built to the design of Olmsted Brothers, the firm of Frederick Law Olmsted Jr. and John Charles Olmsted in the early 20th century. The parkland was reclaimed mostly from marshlands of Greenwich Island, one of several islands in the area created by river channels present in the 18th and 19th centuries. The use of the park for the Sesquicentennial Exposition in 1926 and subsequent improvements have moderately changed the original design, keeping the main character of the park west of Broad Street. The original plan of the Olmsted Brothers still remains highly visible and significant west of Broad Street.

The official name was changed from League Island Park to Franklin Delano Roosevelt Park in 1955.

The park's boathouse (1916), gazebo (1914) and American Swedish Historical Museum (1926) are reminders of the 1926 Exposition. In 2000, the park was added to the Philadelphia Register of Historic Places.

In 2019 the FDR golf course, which was open for almost 80 years of operations, was closed with plans to convert the space to recreation space.

The Anna C. Verna Playground was opened in October 2023. The 2-acre all-ages playground features the largest swing set in North America, and custom-designed “birdhouse” structures with slides and climbing areas that acknowledge FDR Park's role as a premier bird habitat.

== Environment ==
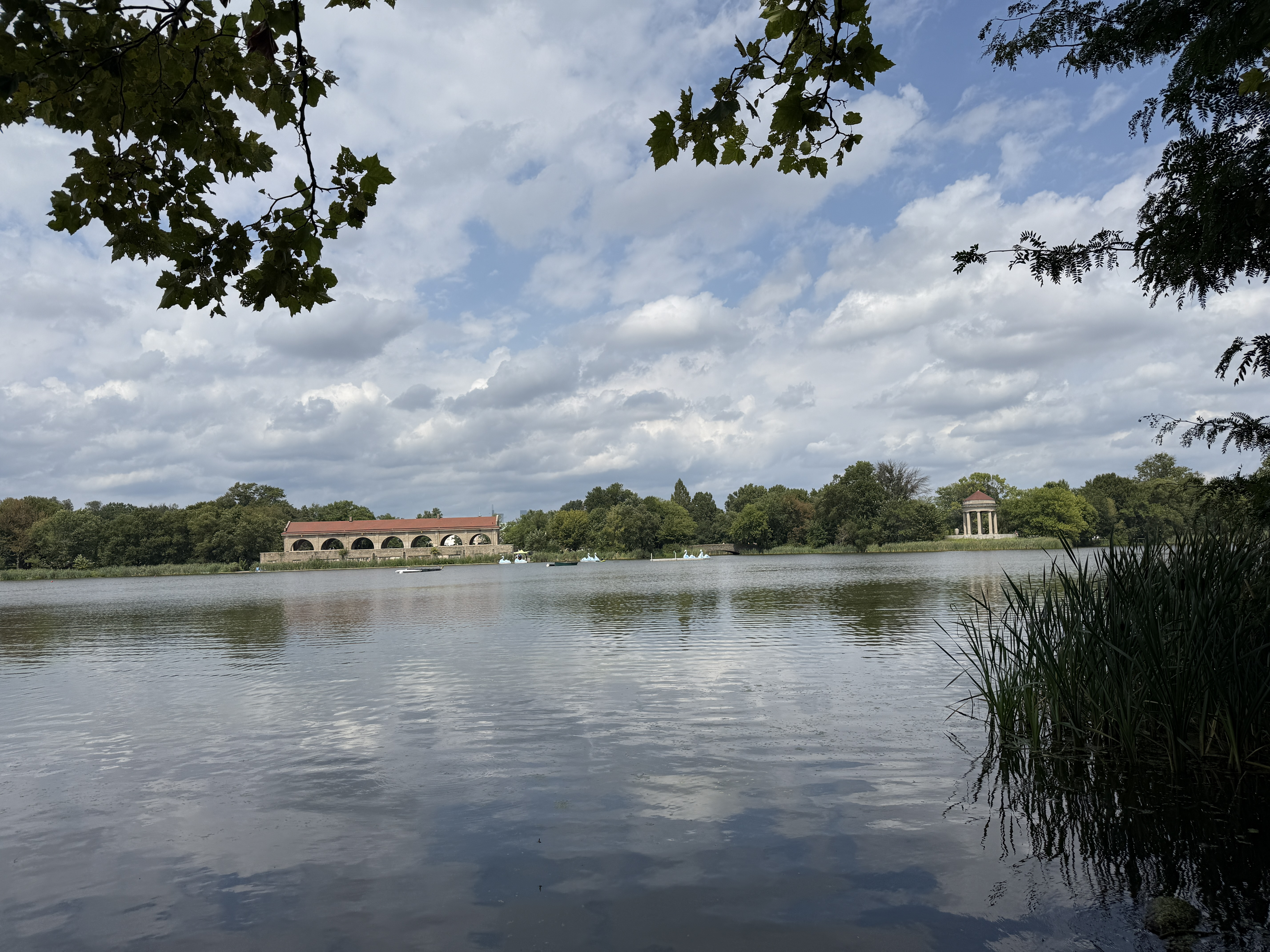
Edgewood Lake in Franklin Delano Roosevelt Park

FDR Park is located on the Atlantic Coastal Plain, a hydrographic province which includes extreme southeastern Pennsylvania and southern New Jersey. The Coastal Plain supports different plants and animals from the adjacent Piedmont of Pennsylvania. Because of the extreme development of the Coastal Plain in Pennsylvania, many of these distinctive plants and animals are rare in the state.

The ponds and lagoons are remnants of the tidal marsh and channel system which originally occupied the area between the Schuylkill and Delaware rivers. Diking, draining and filling of these marshes probably started with the first settlement of the area by the Swedes in the early 17th century, culminating in the installation of a tide gate designed to permit drainage from the park while minimizing inflow from the Delaware River.

The Pennsylvania Audubon Society has designated the park as an Important Bird Area (IBA). Birds that have natural habitats to watch for in the park are shovelers, gadwall, wigeon, ring-necks, bufflehead, redhead, scaup, ruddys, pintail, pied-billed grebes, snow geese, Canada goose, and herons.

== Important Bird Area (IBA) ==
The National Audubon Society of Pennsylvania has noted that FDR Park is one of the best places in Philadelphia to observe birds because it contains a variety of habitats, including wetlands, and waterways. Among bird categories, the park is best known as a place to observe waterfowl, as many various species can be seen there during their migrations.

In addition to mallards and Canada geese, the park attracts large numbers of northern shovelers, gadwall, and American and Eurasian wigeon; redhead, lesser and greater scaup; bufflehead; ruddy ducks; northern pintail; green-winged teal; hooded mergansers; ring-necked ducks, American black ducks, and other rarer duck species. Also seen at the park are pied-billed grebe, double-crested cormorants, American coots and other kinds of non-duck waterfowl. Many other birds may also be seen, from warblers to raptors.

== Points of interest ==
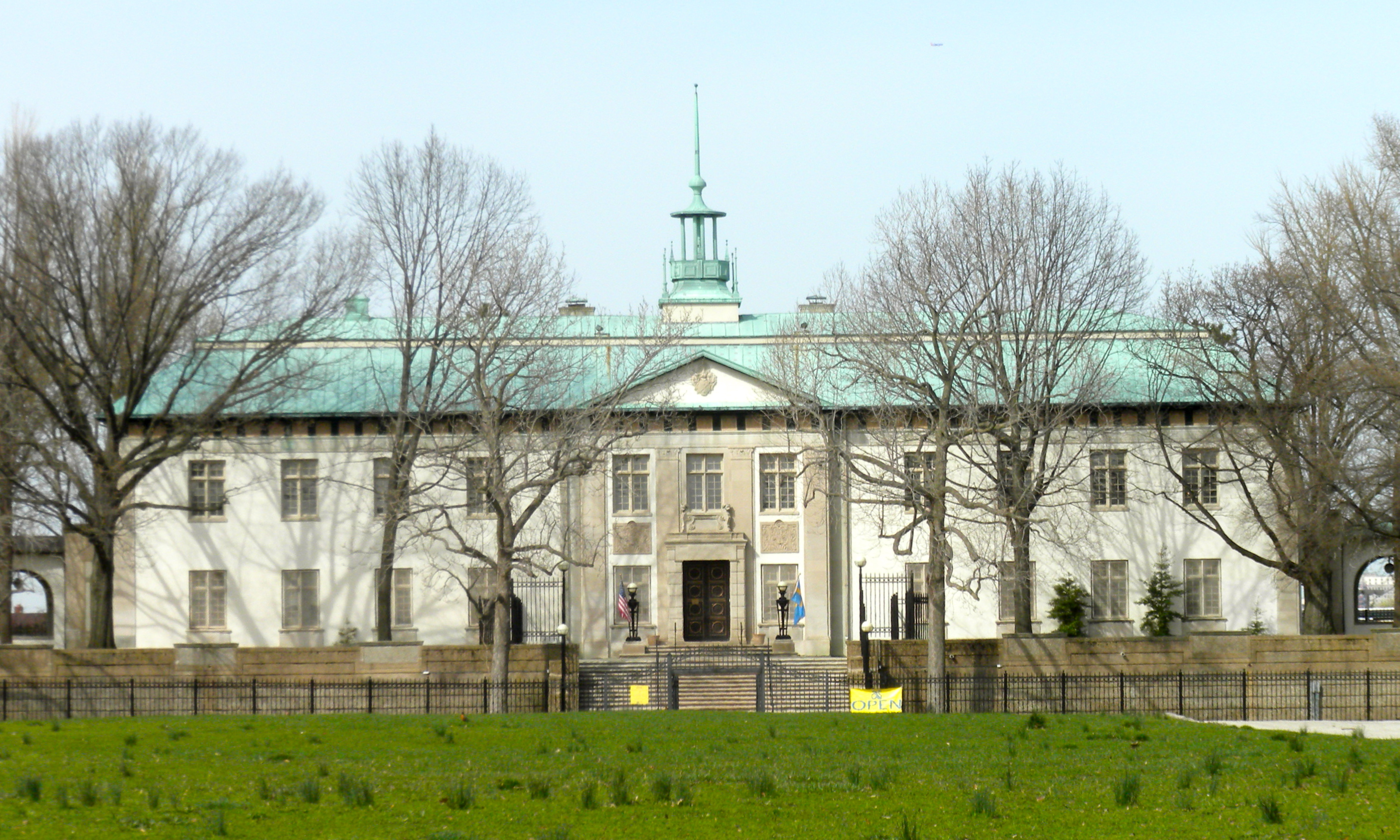
American Swedish Historical Museum

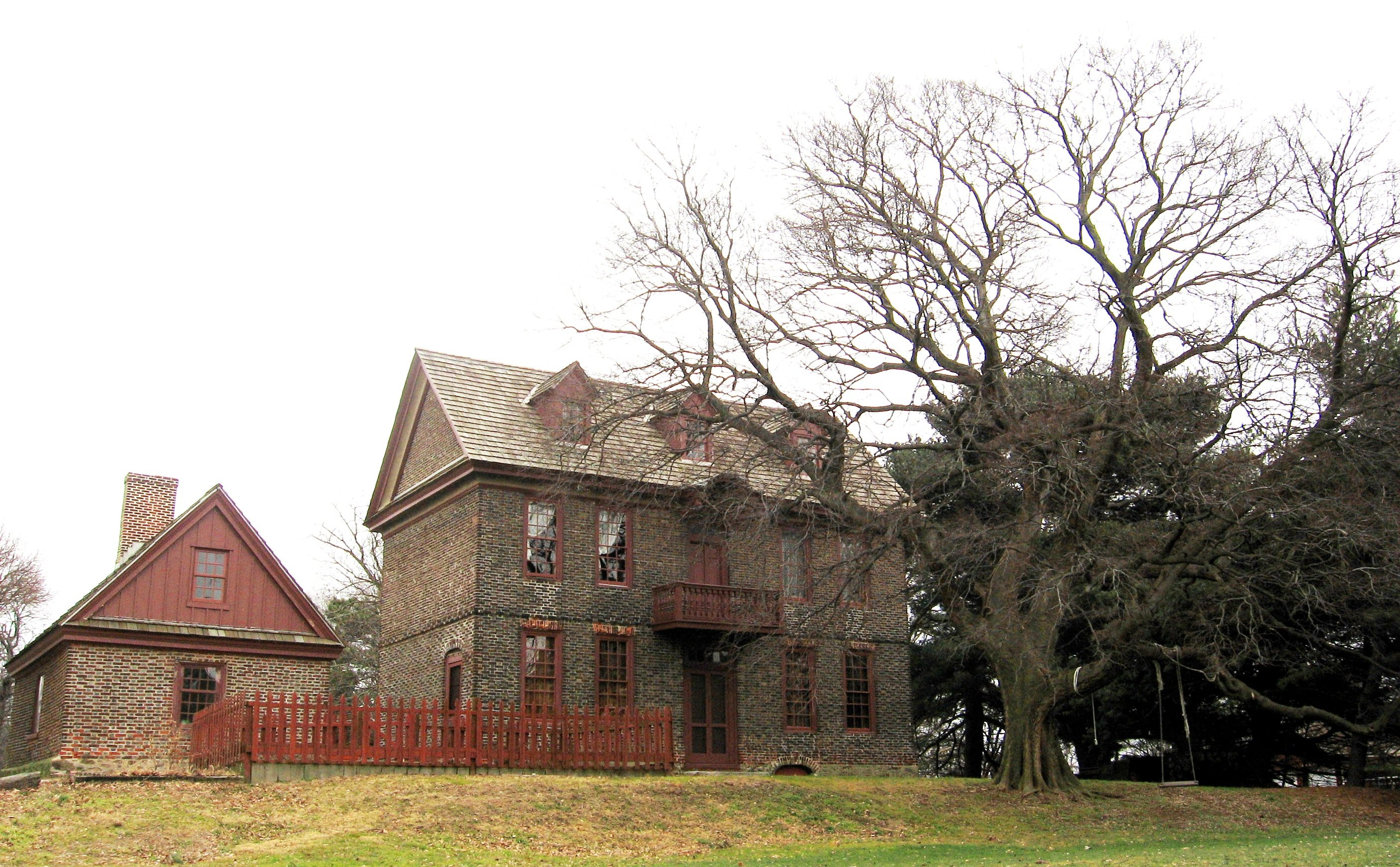
Bellaire Manor

- American Swedish Historical Museum
- Boat House at Edgewood Lake
- Gazebo overlooking Edgewood Lake
- Bellaire Manor built 1750 by Samuel Preston Provincial Treasurer and trustee of William Penn's estate
- Six single-span bridges, built in 1914, with random-coursed schist walls, soldiercourse segmental arches, and soldiercourse coping.

== Recreation ==
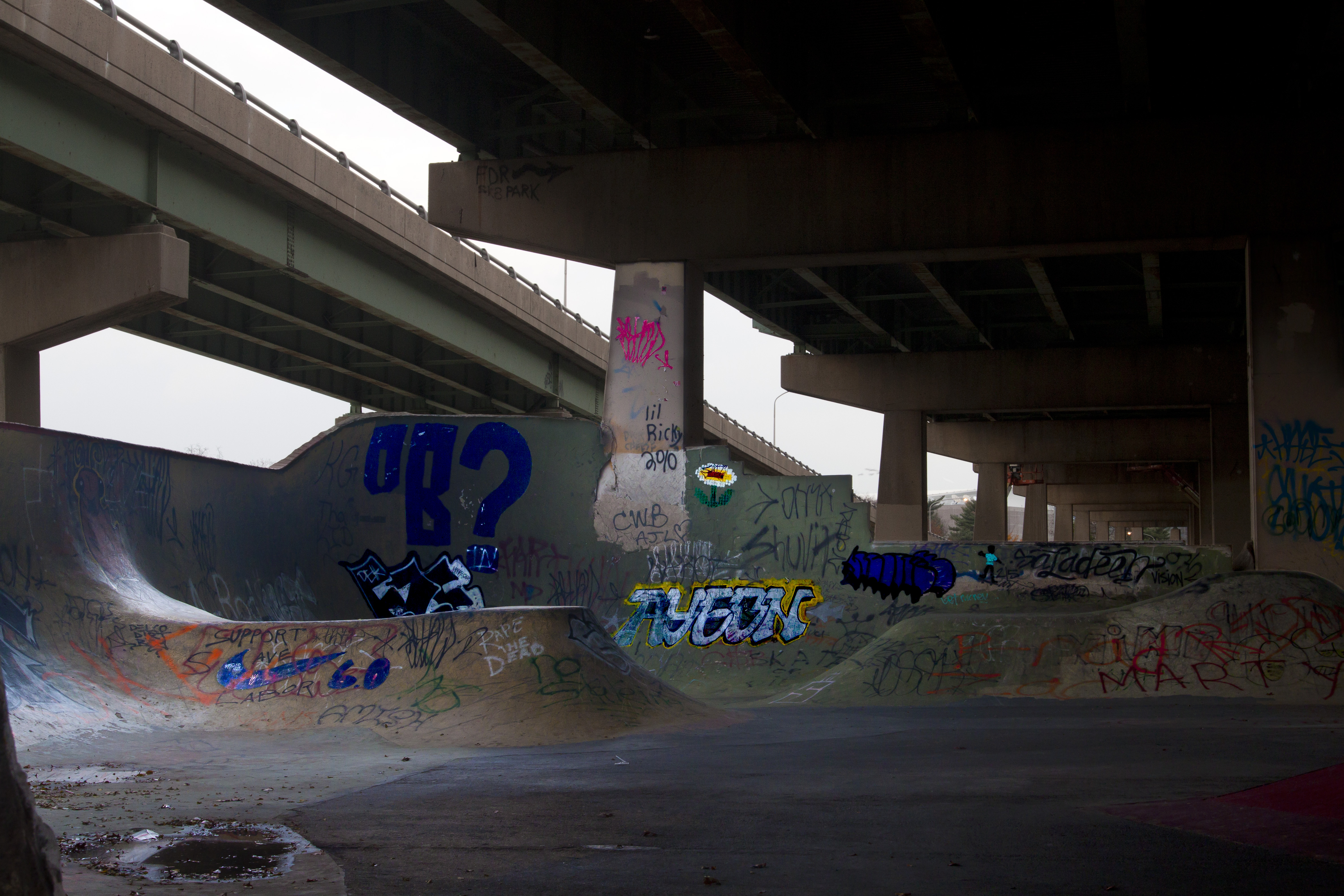
FDR Skatepark

- Golf course (Closed Oct 31, 2019)
- Tennis courts
- Soccer field
- Richie Ashburn baseball field
- Skateboard park under I-95
- Children's playgrounds with a child scaled baseball field
- Lakeside fishing
- Bird watching
- Model boat regatta racing at Meadow Lake Boat House

== Events ==
- Music Festival: August 1, 1994 the Lollapalooza music festival was held in Philadelphia.
- Baseball: Carpenter's Cup Classic annual playoffs between local High School teams with the final game at Citizens Bank Park.
- Philadelphia Flower Show, held at FDR Park in 2021 and 2022.
- Southeast Asian Food Market, weekends spring through fall

== See also ==
- List of parks in Philadelphia
- Marconi Plaza
- Sesquicentennial Exposition
