= Infinity Power Chutes =

American aircraft manufacturer

Infinity Power Chutes, LLC
- Company type: Limited liability company
- Industry: Aerospace
- Headquarters: Uniondale, Indiana, United States
- Key people: President: Frank Williams (since 2019)
- Products: Powered parachutes
- Website: infinitypowerchutes.com

Infinity Power Chutes, LLC is an American aircraft manufacturer currently based in Uniondale, Indiana and headed by Frank Williams since 2019. It was originally located in Bronson, Michigan then moved to Sturgis, Michigan. The company specializes in the design and manufacture of powered parachutes in the form of ready-to-fly aircraft under the US FAR 103 Ultralight Vehicles rules, the European Fédération Aéronautique Internationale microlight and the American light-sport aircraft categories.

Infinity is a limited liability company.

The company currently offers two models of powered parachute, the Infinity Commander two seat light sport aircraft and the Infinity Challenger single-seater. The US Federal Aviation Administration had 191 aircraft made by Infinity registered in July 2015.

== Aircraft ==
Summary of aircraft built by Infinity Power Chutes
Model name	First flight	Number built	Type
Infinity Challenger			single-seat powered parachute
Infinity Commander			two-seat powered parachute
Infinity Purple			two-seat powered parachute
