= Comcast Center (disambiguation) =

Comcast Center is a skyscraper in Philadelphia, Pennsylvania, that houses the headquarters of Comcast Corporation.

Comcast Center may also refer to:

- Comcast Center, former name of Xfinity Center (College Park, Maryland), an arena at the University of Maryland, US
- Comcast Center, former name of Xfinity Center (Mansfield, Massachusetts), an amphitheater outside of Boston, US

== See also ==
- Comcast Technology Center, a skyscraper in Center City, Philadelphia, US
- Comcast Building, the current official name of 30 Rockefeller Plaza, a skyscraper in New York City, US
