= Finite map =

A finite map can be one of the following:

- In computer science, finite map is a synonym for an associative array.
- A finite map in algebraic geometry is a regular map such that the preimage of any point is a finite set, plus a closedness property.
