= Infinity (role-playing game) =

Role-playing game

- Designers: Derrick Charbonnet; Terry Podgorski
- Publishers: The Infinity Company
- Publication: 1979
- Genres: Universal

Infinity is a role-playing game published by The Infinity Company in 1979.

== Description ==
Infinity is a universal system — like GURPS, it can be used in any role-playing game genre or setting. It has brief rules for character attributes, skills, and magic, and much more detailed rules for personal and vehicular movement and combat. The game is designed with rules that allow consistent movement and combat in any time period.

== Publication history ==
Infinity was designed by Derrick Charbonnet and Terry Podgorski, and published by The Infinity Company in 1979 as a 36-page book, but few copies were ever distributed.

== Reception ==
In Issue 21 of Abyss (October 1982), David Hargrave called this "a homogenized and simplified amalgam of practically every system on the market." Hargrave noted that Infinity "concentrated primarily on combat and gave short shrift to practically every other aspect of role-playing ... this is definitely not a complete and viable role-playing system which could stand on its own." On the positive side, Hargrave found "the combat system was very playable and well worked out, creating a fast-paced, if somewhat unrealistic melee." Hargrave concluded, "I would advise potential buyers to remember that this is definitely not complete, but given that reservation, it is a potentially useful game aid. It is easy to play and could enhance many FRP or SF campaigns as long as you are willing to sacrifice realism for playability."
