= Lemniscate (disambiguation) =

A lemniscate is a mathematical curve shaped like a figure eight.

Lemniscate may also refer to:

- Polynomial lemniscate, the set of complex numbers for which a given polynomial has a constant absolute value
- The infinity symbol ∞, sometimes called a lemniscate because of its shape
- Lemniscate (album), by Vinyl Williams

== See also ==
- Lemnis Gate, a first-person-shooter video game
