= Infinite =

Infinite may refer to:

== Mathematics and philosophy ==
- Infinite set, a set that is not a finite set
- Infinite numbers, numbers defined as larger than all finite numbers, a.k.a. transfinite numbers
- Infinity, a mathematical property of boundlessly large sets or numbers
  - Infinity (philosophy), an abstract concept describing something without any limit

== Music ==
=== Performers ===
- Infinite (group), a South Korean boy band
- Infinite (rapper), Canadian rapper

=== Albums ===
- Infinite (Deep Purple album), 2017
- Infinite (Eminem album) or the title song (see below), 1996
- Infinite (Mobb Deep album), 2025
- Infinite Icon (Paris Hilton album), 2024
- Infinite (Sam Concepcion album), 2013
- Infinite (Stratovarius album), 2000
- The Infinite (album), by Dave Douglas, 2002
- Infinite, by Kazumi Watanabe, 1971
- Infinite, an EP by Haywyre, 2012

=== Songs ===
- "Infinite" (Beni Arashiro song), 2004
- "Infinite" (Eminem song), 1996
- "Infinite" (Notaker song), 2016
- "Infinite", by Forbidden from Twisted into Form, 1990

== Other uses ==
- Infinite (film), a 2021 science fiction film
- "The Infinites", a 1953 science fiction short story by Philip K. Dick
- The Infinites, a fictional group of cosmic beings in the Avengers Infinity comic book series
- Infinite, a character in the video game Sonic Forces
- Infinite Flight, a flight simulator released on 2011
- Halo Infinite, 2021 video game
- Infinity symbol, ∞

== See also ==
- Infinity (disambiguation)
