= Infiniti (album) =

Studio album by Junoon
- Released: July 1, 2005
- Recorded: January–May 2005 at Digital Fidelity Studio, in Lahore, Pakistan and Grandview Studios in New York City, United States
- Genres: Sufi rock, Classical rock, Hard rock, Pop rock
- Length: 53:40
- Labels: EMI, Nameless Sufi Music
- Producers: John Alec, Salman Ahmad

Alternative cover
- Junooni Cover.

Singles from Infiniti
- 1. "Ghoom Taana" Released: August 8, 2004; 2. "Al-Vida" Released: December 4, 2005

Infiniti is the debut album of the singer-songwriter/multi-instrumentalist Salman Ahmad. The album was released on July 1, 2005 under the record label EMI. Singles from the album include "Ghoom Taana" and "Al-Vida". The single "Ghoom Taana" also featured in Junoon's seventh studio album Dewaar. Althoug, the album was released as a solo album of Salman, it was slated to be Junoon's eighth studio album.

The single "Ghoom Taana" featured Shubha Mudgal on vocals, but originally the song was sung by Ali Noor, from Noori and former Junoon vocalist, Ali Azmat.

== Track listing ==
All music written & composed by Salman and Sabir Zafar, those which are not are mentioned below.

Infiniti
No.	Title	Length
1.	"Nachoon Gi"	4:34
2.	"Al-Vida"	5:19
3.	"Ghoom Taana"	7:17
4.	"Nazar"	4:12
5.	"Mein Tum Sey Duur"	5:23
6.	"Tu Lang Ja"	3:55
7.	"Terey Liye"	3:48
8.	"Do Dil"	4:31
9.	"Tanha"	3:33
10.	"Sagar"	5:34
11.	"Mun Gum Sum"	4:30
12.	"Masjid Mandir"	1:58
13.	"Ghoom Taana [Remix]"	5:33
14.	"Jiyain"	4:18

== Personnel ==
All information is taken from the CD.

Junoon

- Salman Ahmad - vocals, lead guitar

Additional musicians

- Ashiq Ali Mir - tabla and dhol
- John Alec - bass guitar and sitar
- Mekaal Hasan - bass guitar
- Jay Dittamo - drums and percussion
- Vocals on "Ghoom Taana" by Shubha Mudgal

Production

- Produced by John Alec and Salman Ahmad
- Recorded and mixed at Digital Fidelity Studio, Lahore, Pakistan and Grandview Studios in Grandview, New York
- Engineered and mixed by John Alec
