= Finitely presented =

In mathematics, finitely presented may refer to:

- finitely presented group
- finitely presented monoid
- finitely presented module
- finitely presented algebra
- finitely presented scheme, a global version of a finitely presented algebra
- finitely presentable object, in category theory

== See also ==
- Finitely generated object
