= South Philadelphia Sports Complex =

Sports complex in Philadelphia, U.S.

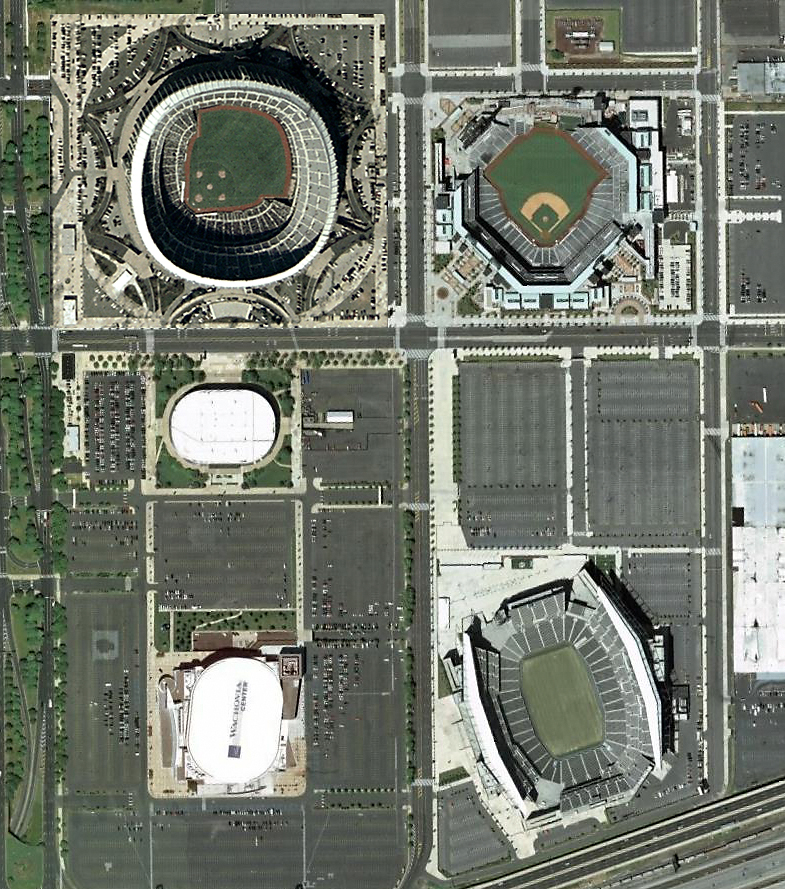
- The South Philadelphia Sports Complex as it existed in 2003–2004. Clockwise from top right: Citizens Bank Park, Lincoln Financial Field, Xfinity Mobile Arena (formerly the site of John F. Kennedy Stadium), the Spectrum (razed in 2011), and Veterans Stadium (imploded in 2004). Interstate 95, which passes the complex, can be seen at the bottom right corner of the photo.
- Interactive map of South Philadelphia Sports Complex
- Address: Philadelphia, Pennsylvania; United States
- Coordinates: 39.904°N 75.169°W
- Facilities: Xfinity Mobile Arena; Lincoln Financial Field; Citizens Bank Park; Stateside Live!
- Public transit: SEPTA Metro: (NRG Station); SEPTA bus: 4, 45, 68

The South Philadelphia Sports Complex is the home of four prominent Philadelphia professional sports teams. The complex is located in South Philadelphia and is the site of Xfinity Mobile Arena, home arena for the Philadelphia 76ers and Philadelphia Flyers, Lincoln Financial Field, home field for the Philadelphia Eagles, Citizens Bank Park, home field for the Philadelphia Phillies, and Stateside Live!, a sports retail and entertainment center, in addition to shared parking lots for the complex's venues.

== History ==
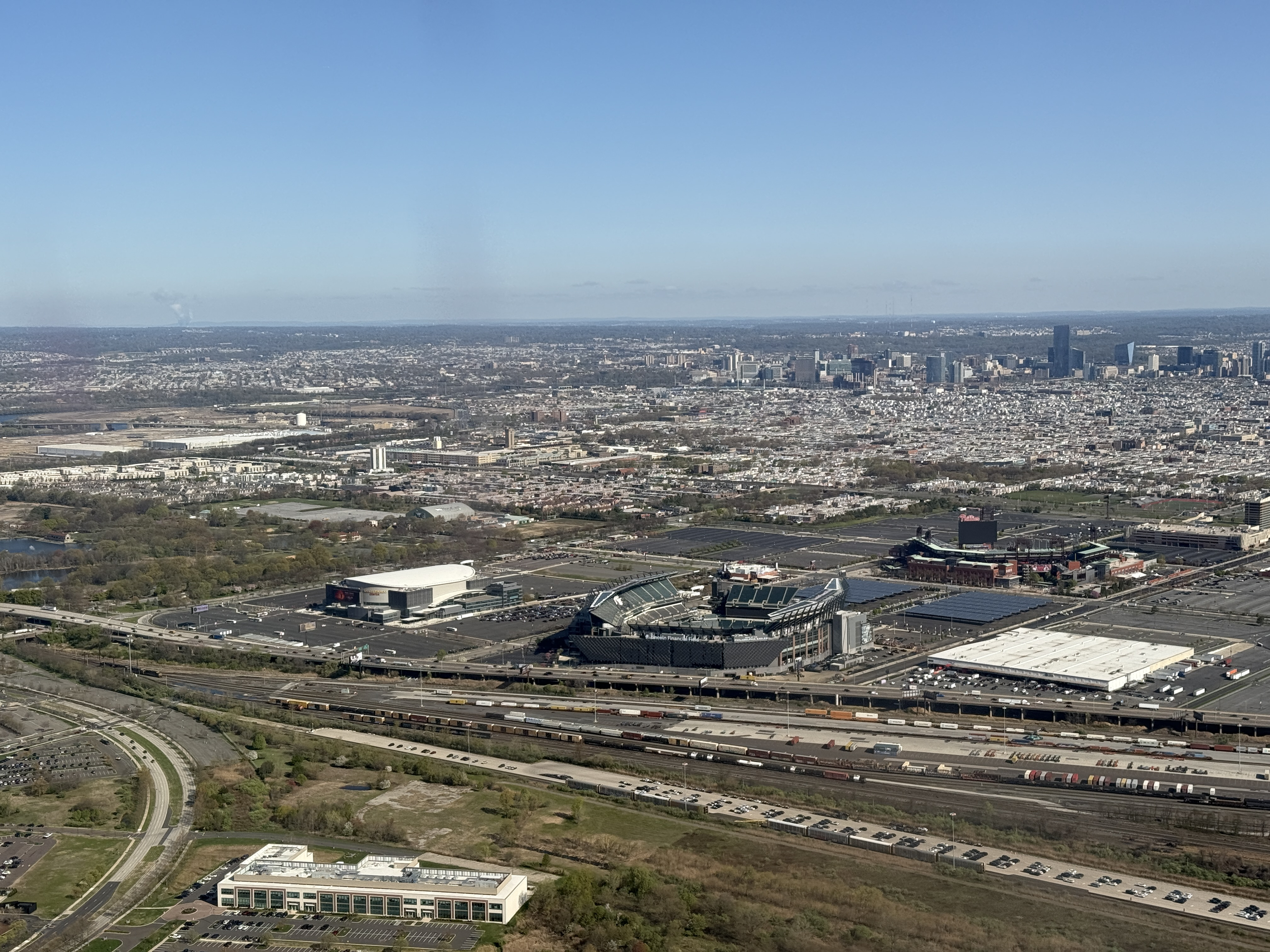
Aerial view of the South Philadelphia Sports Complex in 2025

Before its development, the region that is now the South Philadelphia Sports Complex was a shanty town known as "The Neck" of the undeveloped League Island area, formerly Passyunk Township. Neckers developed an agricultural economy, raising hogs and growing vegetables to sell at markets in town. City officials who wanted to develop the area passed laws to outlaw these crucial aspects of its economy.

In 1911, pigs were banned within city limits. For the next six years, Philadelphia police would regularly raid illegal pig farms, seize pigs and raze the shanties where farmers lived.

As early as April 1914, "a plot of ground on Broad Street near the Navy Yard was also considered" as a location on which to erect a stadium for the Army–Navy Game with a capacity greater than Franklin Field and Shibe Park, both of which had not yet been expanded in 1914.

Oregon Avenue was the southern border of development in the city up to the 1920s.

In 1926, the City selected the area south of Oregon Avenue for the 1926 Sesquicentennial International Exposition and developed the large river delta land south of Oregon Avenue. South Broad Street was a grand European-styled boulevard surrounded by massive exhibit buildings and structures that were to be a testament to American science, culture, and progress for the future. Following the close of the celebration of these 150 years of American Independence on the Avenue of the Colonies of South Broad Street came quick total demolition, except for the stadium.

Longshoremen, railroad workers and others continued to inhabit shanties along Stone House Lane through the 1950s, protected from eviction by Republican politicians who courted their community for political support. The street was ultimately cleared for development by the reform Democratic administration of Joseph S. Clark Jr.

The South Philadelphia Sports Complex was once home to three stadiums that have since been demolished: John F. Kennedy Stadium (1926–1992), Veterans Stadium (1971–2004), and the Spectrum (1967–2011).

Prior to building Veterans Stadium across Pattison Avenue north of JFK Stadium, family entertainment included a bowling alley and a drive-in theater, which was a venue created by Camden, New Jersey, chemical company magnate Richard M. Hollingshead, Jr., whose family owned and operated the R.M. Hollingshead Corporation chemical plant in Camden and that peaked in popularity in the 1950s and 1960s.

== Current facilities ==
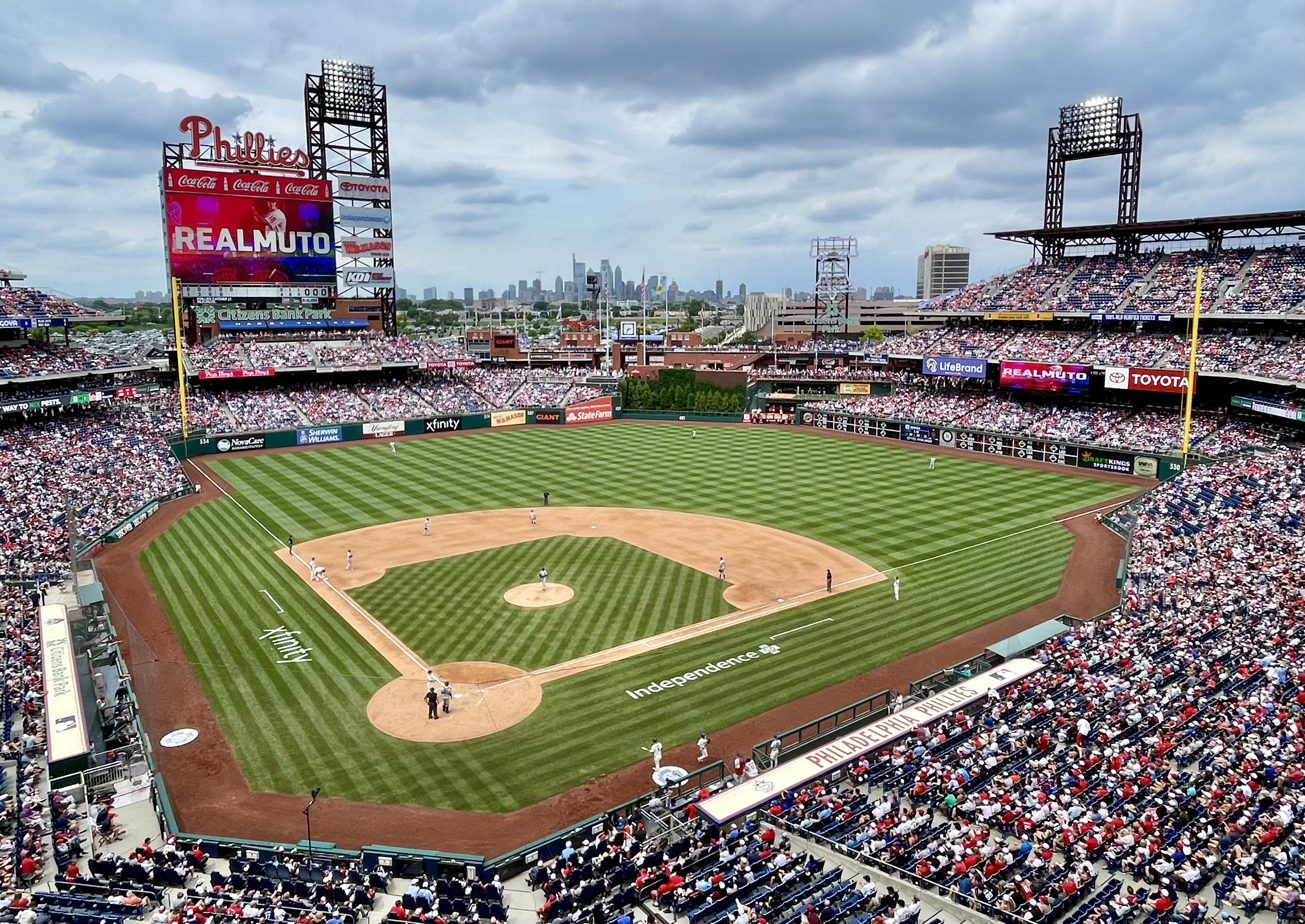
Citizens Bank Park (2004–present)

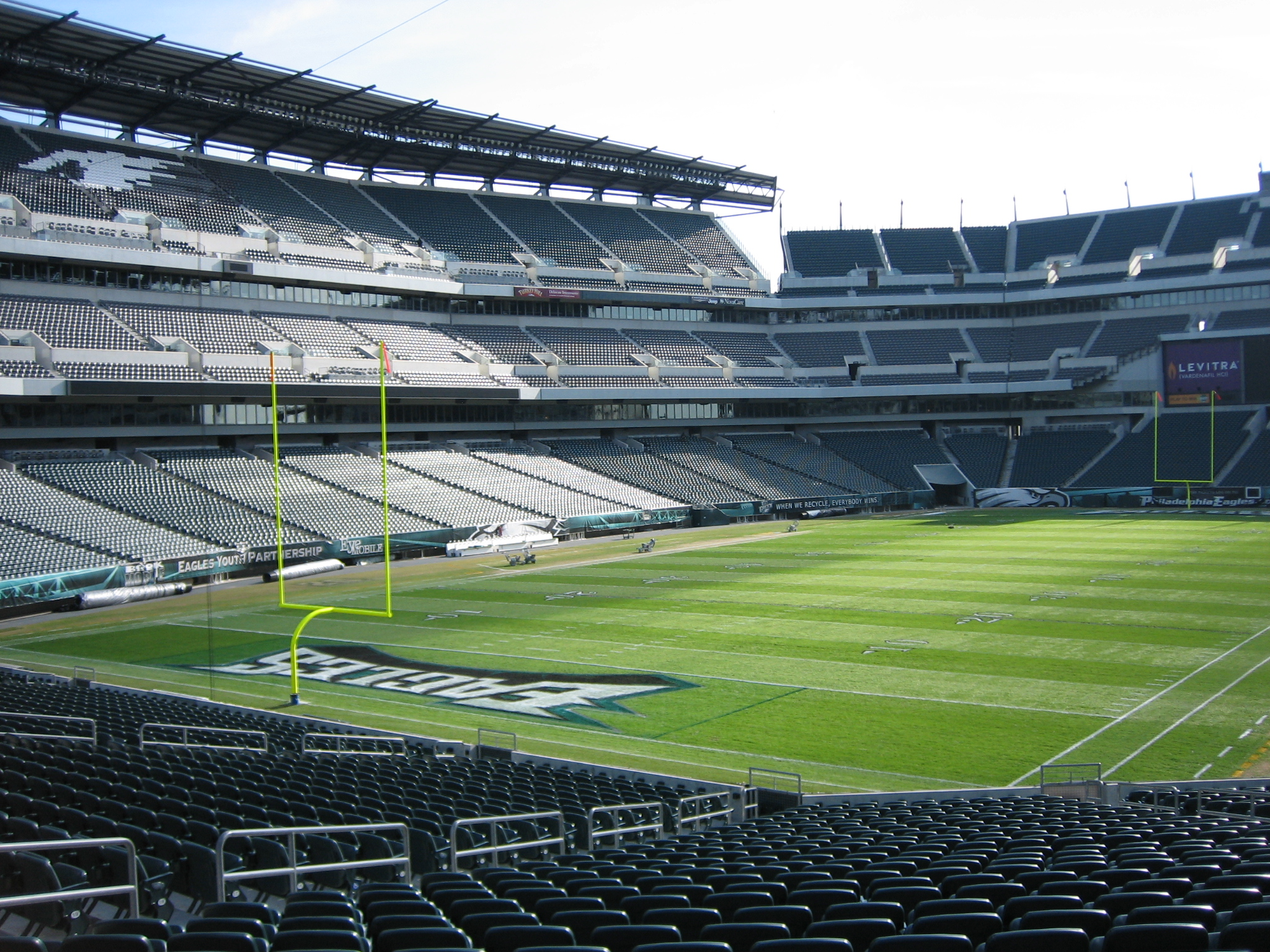
Lincoln Financial Field (2003–present)

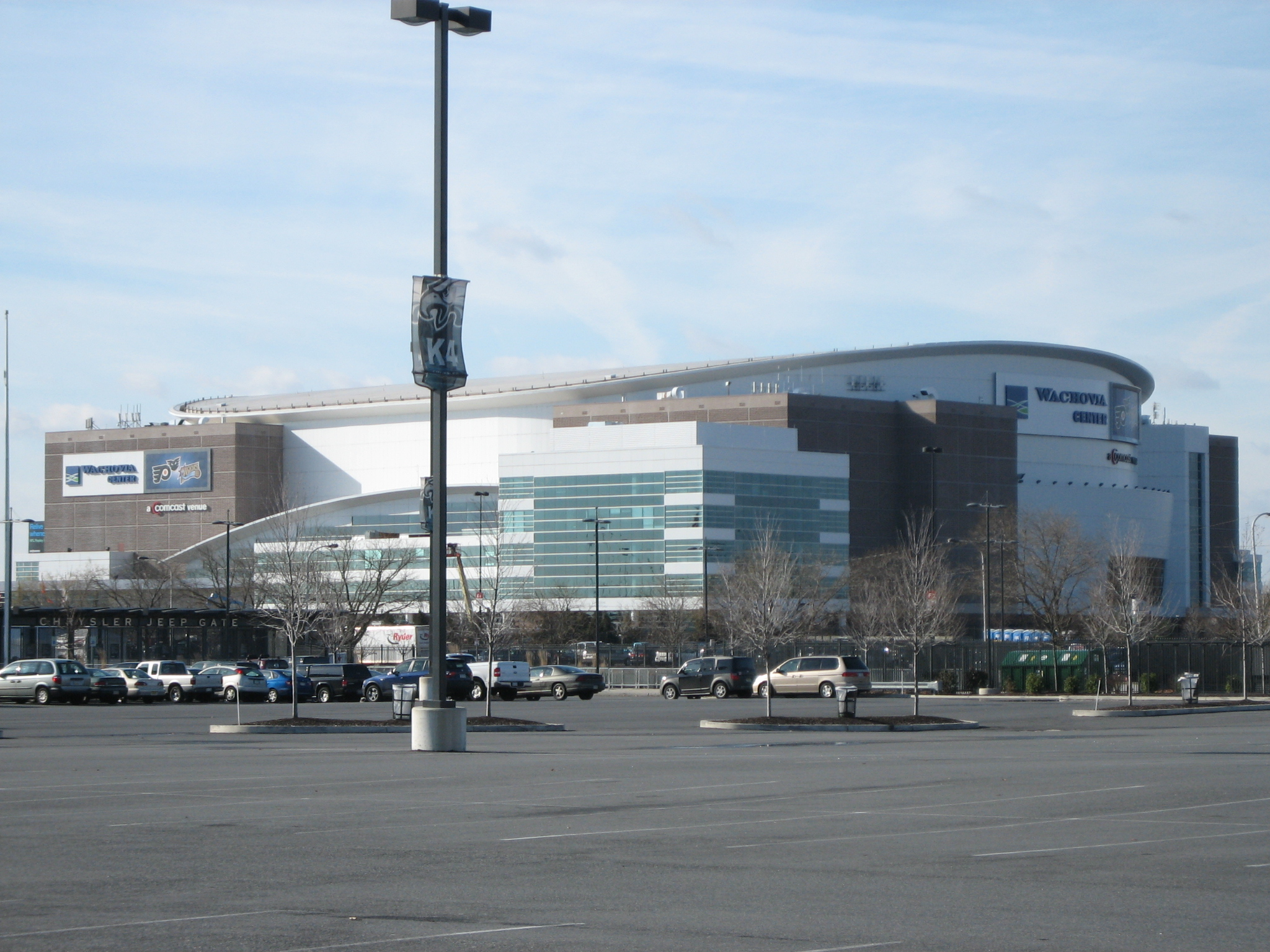
Xfinity Mobile Arena (1996–present)

- Citizens Bank Park: This stadium opened in 2004 and is home to MLB's Philadelphia Phillies.
- Lincoln Financial Field: Sometimes referred to as The Linc, Lincoln Financial Field opened in 2003 and is home to the NFL's Philadelphia Eagles and the Temple Owls football team (NCAA).
  - Jefferson Health Training Complex: Though not part of the complex proper and laying west of Broad Street, the training facility and headquarters for the Eagles is sited directly across Lot T from Citizens Bank Park.
- Xfinity Mobile Arena: The arena opened in 1996 and is home to the Philadelphia Flyers (NHL) and Philadelphia 76ers (NBA). The Villanova Wildcats (NCAA basketball) play select games at Xfinity Mobile Arena.
- Stateside Live!: A retail and entertainment center was built just east of the site of the since demolished Spectrum on 11th Street.

== Former facilities ==
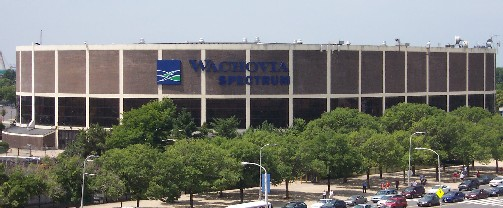
The Spectrum (1967–2011)

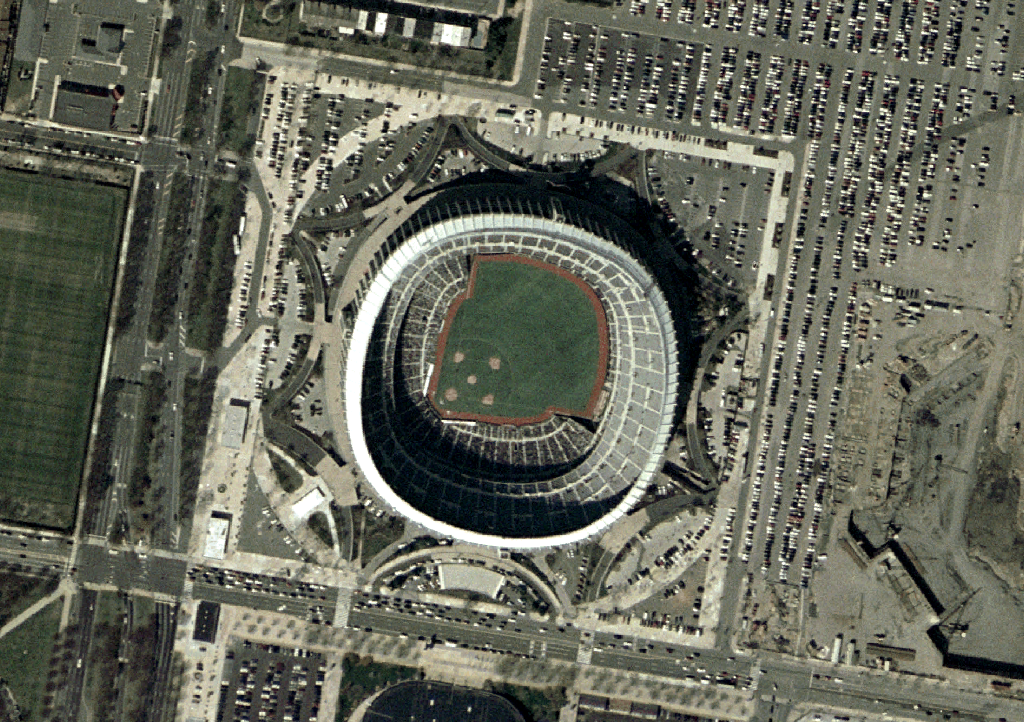
Veterans Stadium (1971–2004)

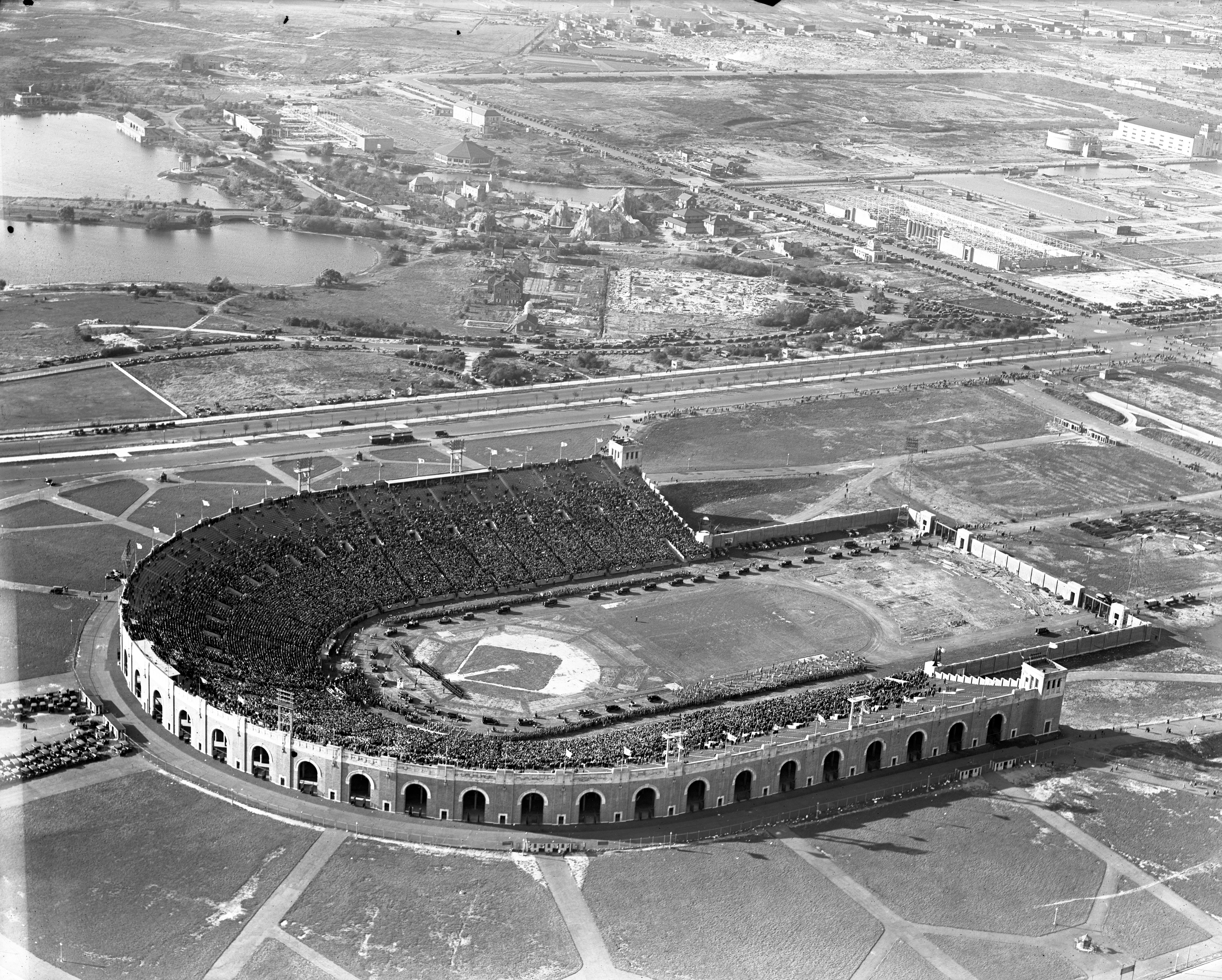
John F. Kennedy Stadium (1926–1992)

- John F. Kennedy Stadium: JFK Stadium opened in 1926 as Sesquicentennial Stadium for the Sesquicentennial Exposition, and was renamed Philadelphia Municipal Stadium following the exposition. The name was again changed in 1964 in honor of President John F. Kennedy, who was assassinated on November 22, 1963. JFK Stadium was condemned in 1989 and demolished in 1992. JFK was home to the Eagles, the Philadelphia Quakers of the first American Football League, the Philadelphia Bell of the World Football League, and 42 Army–Navy Games. It was also one of the host sites for the original Live Aid concert in 1985, and the Jacksons Victory Tour in September 1984.
- The Spectrum: The Spectrum (also known as the CoreStates Spectrum, First Union Spectrum, and Wachovia Spectrum during its history) opened in 1967 and was the home of the Flyers, 76ers and Philadelphia Wings until 1996. From 1996 to 2009 the Spectrum was the home of the Philadelphia Phantoms (AHL), Philadelphia KiXX (NISL), and served as an alternate home for the Soul. The Spectrum hosted six Stanley Cup Finals, four NBA Finals, two NHL All-Star Games, two NBA All-Star Games and two NCAA Final Fours. The Spectrum closed on October 31, 2009, following Pearl Jam's performance at the last show of a four-night concert set. Demolition of the Spectrum began in November 2010 and was completed in April 2011.
- Veterans Stadium: also known as "The Vet", opened in 1971, closed in 2003, and was imploded on March 21, 2004. The Vet was home of the Eagles and the Phillies. The Vet also hosted three World Series (1980, 1983 and 1993), two Major League Baseball All-Star Games (1976 and 1996) and 17 Army–Navy Games.
- Aquarama Aquarium Theater of the Sea: existed between 1962 and 1969. It was located at 3200 South Broad Street bordering the Packer Park residential neighborhood in South Philadelphia. It was the successor to the Philadelphia Aquarium, established in the City of Philadelphia and built in 1911 along the Schuylkill River northwest of the Parkway's Art Museum in Center City. Elements of family fun exhibits and aquatic shows augmented the relocated aquarium. The new public spaces hosted popular teen dances. They became an identifiable part of South Philadelphia's pop culture scene during the 1950s and 1960s with disc jockeys like Ed Hurst, Jerry Blavat and Dick Clark of American Bandstand garnering significant attention. After its demolition, a movie theater and a fast-food hamburger chain, the "Steer-in", were built on the site, which would be demolished in the 1990s to make way for new residential and commercial development.

== Future facilities ==
- New South Philadelphia Arena, scheduled for a summer 2030 completion, will be the new home of the Flyers, 76ers, and a future WNBA team. The arena will be located on the site of the former Spectrum.

== Transportation ==
NRG Station on the SEPTA Metro B is within walking distance of the three venues in the area. It was once known as Pattison Station until it was renamed AT&T Station under a naming rights agreement in 2010; the naming rights passed to NRG Energy in 2018, which also maintains the complex's own solar and wind grid infrastructure to allow it to generate its own power. NRG station is served by local trains along with special Sports Express trains making limited stops along the line before and after events at the Sports Complex. SEPTA City Bus routes 4 and 17 provide service to the Sports Complex.

== Sports Complex Special Services District ==
Sports Complex Special Services District
- Formation: 2002
- Type: 501(c)(3)
- Headquarters: 3300 South 7th Street; Philadelphia, Pennsylvania
- Region served: South Philadelphia Sports Complex
- Website: http://www.scssd.org/

The Sports Complex Special Services District (SCSSD) is a 501(c)(3) non-profit organization in Philadelphia that was established in the year 2002 to minimize the impact of concentrating major sporting and entertainment facilities in a geographic area adjacent to established Philadelphia residential neighborhoods of South Philadelphia.

The mission is to protect community interests, improve neighborhood quality of life, and promote efficient operation within the neighborhood(s) of adjacent sports venues of the Citizen's Ball Park, Lincoln Financial Field, multi-event Xfinity Mobile Arena and the former Spectrum Arena (demolished 2010). The mission is fulfilled by providing support and special services to the residential neighborhood(s) in close proximity to the South Philadelphia Sports Complex.

Primary areas of supportive improvements include attention to traffic calming, directional signage, and orderly traffic patterns and flows, removal of an abundance of excess curbside street and sidewalk trash and debris with dedicated cleaning teams (other than normal City provided services), street tree care for over a thousand trees, landscape beautification of several public medial areas and walkways, recreational facility upgrades, upgrades to street lighting and traffic light enhancements, public safety initiatives, conducts special community events, attends public and civil meetings, circulates a calendar and newsletters, and provides announcements of high traffic events scheduled at the Complex so neighbors can plan family events and travel with knowledge of conditions in advance.

The boundary of the Special District is bounded by Oregon Avenue to the north, 7th Street to the east, I-95 to the south, and 20th Street to the west. It includes the Philadelphia neighborhoods of Packer Park and Marconi Plaza that are represented on the board by four neighborhood districts.

The Special District does not include the "Stateside Live!" dining entertainment built on the former site of the Spectrum Arena. The impact of traffic and patrons has raised concerns by the adjacent neighborhood community and the parkland of FDR Park, which is seeking to have a mechanism to deal with it in an organized structure, similar to the SCSSD.
