= Stateside Live! =

Dining and entertainment complex in Philadelphia

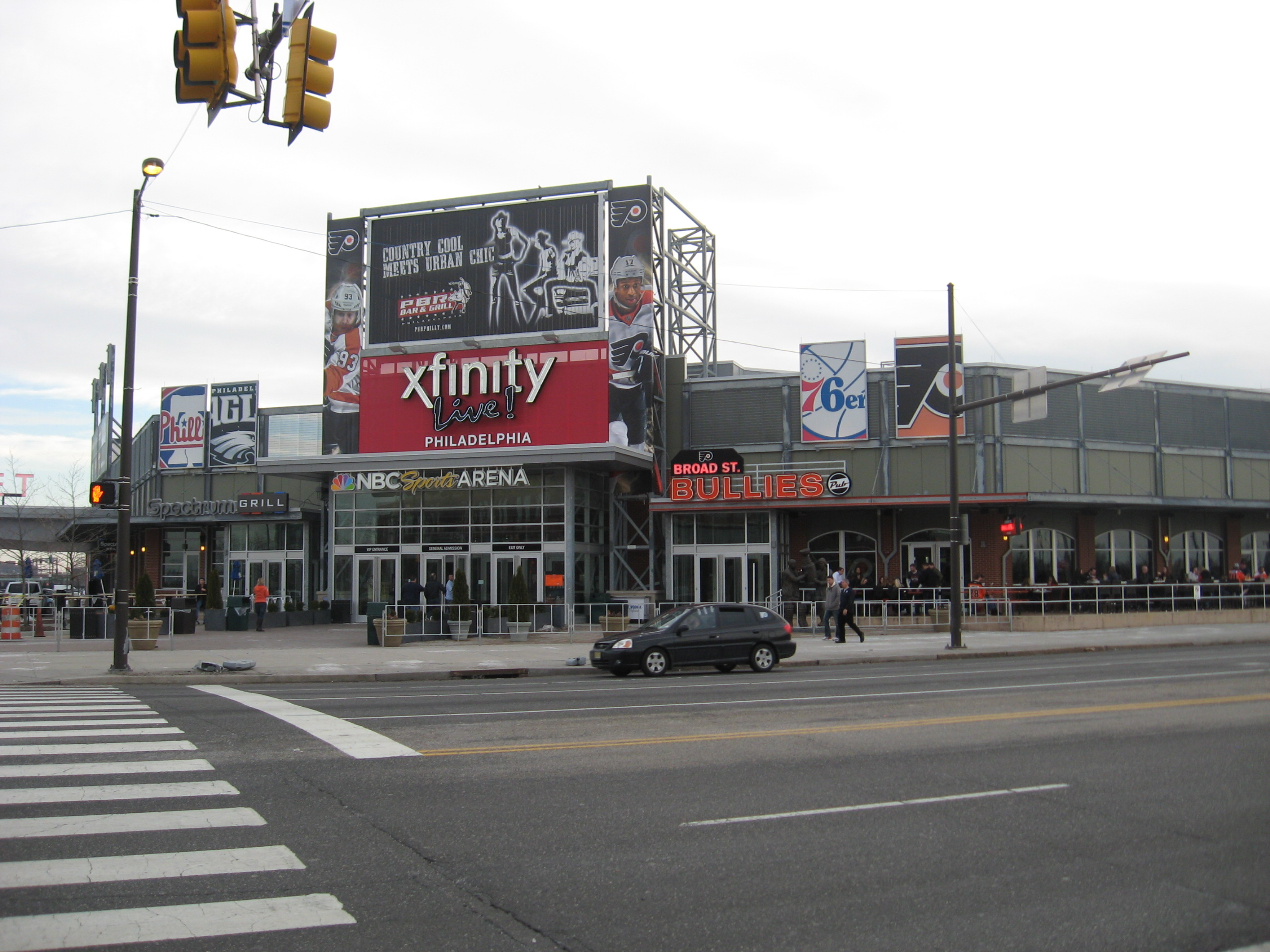
- Stateside Live!, then known as Xfinity Live!, in South Philadelphia in March 2014
- Interactive map of Stateside Live!
- Former names: Philly Live! (2008–2012); Xfinity Live! (2012–2025)
- Location: South Philadelphia, Pennsylvania, U.S.
- Coordinates: 39.90433°N 75.16937°W
- Elevation: 20–25 ft (6–8 m)
- Owner: Comcast Spectacor and The Cordish Companies
- Operator: Live! Hospitality & Entertainment
- Seating type: Restaurant seating
- Type: Restaurants, sports bar, and concert venue
- Current use: Restaurants, sports bar, and concert venue
- Public transit: NRG station: B SEPTA bus: 4, 45, 68

Construction
- Groundbreaking: 2011
- Built: 2012
- Opened: March 2012
- Cost: $50 million est

Website
- statesidelive.com
- Building details

Technical details
- Floor count: 2

Design and construction
- Developer: The Cordish Companies

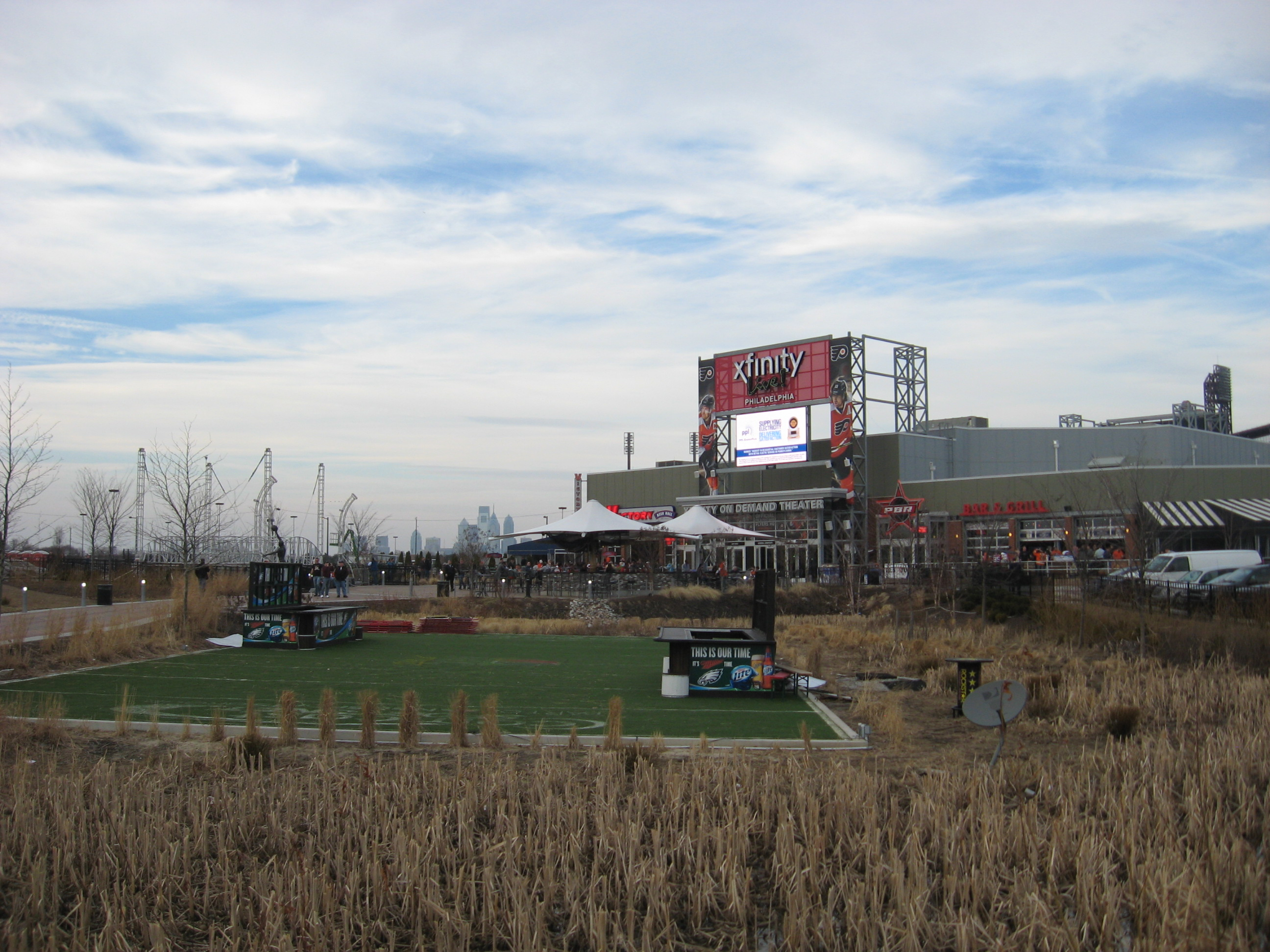
Stateside Live! from the south, with the Center City Philadelphia skyline in the background

Stateside Live! (originally known as Philly Live! prior to construction and Xfinity Live! from 2012 to 2025) is a dining and entertainment complex located at the corner of 11th and Pattison Avenue in the South Philadelphia Sports Complex on the eastern edge of the former site of the Spectrum. It has become a media hub for various live broadcasts.

Stateside Live! is the home of five restaurant and entertainment venues including, Victory Beer Hall, PBR: A Coors Banquet Bar, Broad Street Bullies Pub, 1100 Social and NBC Sports Arena. The district also features an outdoor plaza that is home to the Miller Lite Concert Stage. Often called “Philly's fourth stadium”, the venue has invested over $150 million in original design as well as renovations over the years.

== History ==
Starting in 2008, Comcast Spectacor and Cordish Company partnered for the proposed Art Nouveau design, making use of neon- and LED-lighting to accent structures and walkways. The original Philly Live! concept included an assortment of restaurants with outdoor seating, a hotel along Pattison Avenue, and a spa or health club. In December 2011, Cordish and Comcast Spectacor announced renaming and reinventing the project as Xfinity Live!.

Construction began in the summer of 2011, and the first phase opened in late March 2012 as Xfinity Live!. The development concept was redrawn as a dining and entertainment district. Main attractions of the complex include the NBC Sports Arena and its 32-foot HDTV.

In 2024, Cordish Companies announced a $15 million expansion to the complex that will include a new outdoor beer garden and other outdoor entertainment. The expansion is expected to be completed in early 2026. On August 21, 2025, Cordish Companies announced that the complex would be renamed to "Stateside Live!" after Stateside Brands, a Philadelphia-area vodka company, purchased the naming rights.

== Venues ==
- 1100 Social
- Broad St. Bullies Pub
- PBR Philly
- Victory Beer Hall

=== Former ===
- Spectrum Grill
- Philly Marketplace
- X Bar

=== NBC Sports Arena ===
The NBC Sports Arena is the largest of the five venues inside Stateside Live. At 32 feet tall, the venue holds one of the largest high definition televisions on the East Coast. The sports bar, in partnership with NBC Sports, offers bar food and a viewing experience for major sporting events. NBC Sports Arena holds two of food options: Chickie's & Pete's and Geno's Steaks.
