= 2009 in radio =

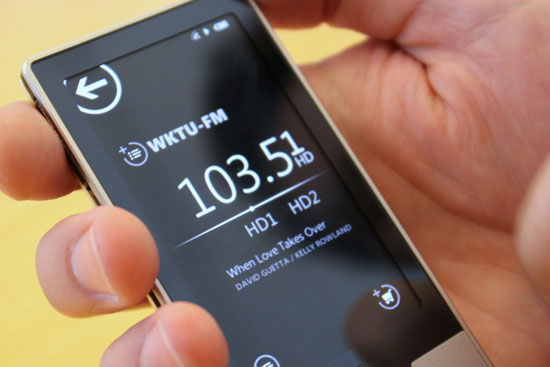
Zune HD device showing HD Radio broadcast.

The following events occurred in radio in 2009.

== Events ==
- January 1: Kurdish TV starts broadcasting in Turkey.
- March 9: ABC Kinglake Ranges, a temporary radio service, makes its first broadcast from Kinglake, Victoria, Australia, to areas in the Shire of Murrindindi affected by the Black Saturday bushfires, using a makeshift transmitter on 97.1FM.
- March 24: The Ray D'Arcy Show on commercial radio station Today FM, covers the Brian Cowen nude portraits story. Producer Will Hanafin claims that a friend of the artist e-mailed photographs of a similar painting to him in January. Hanafin is approached by the Garda and warned he could be charged if he refuses to give up the e-mails.
- April 6: Antena Sarajevo is launched in Bosnia, as an urban radio service for Sarajevo.
- May 11: Kerrang! Radio wins Station Of The Year 1,000,000+ at the Sony Awards.
- June: Radio Erena, a Paris-based radio station broadcasting news in the Tigrinya and Arabic languages to Eritrea, is launched by journalist Biniam Simon.
- June 25: American musician Michael Jackson dies. Radio stations around the world play his music in the months following as a tribute.
- July 4 and July 5: After a 50+ year career, 39 of those years as host of syndicated countdown shows, Casey Kasem hosts his final weekly countdown show. American Top 20 and American Top 10 were spinoffs of his original show, American Top 40, which continues with host Ryan Seacrest.
- July 6–12 – Australian Radio station Triple J holds its 'Hottest 100 of All Time' with Nirvana's "Smells Like Teen Spirit" coming in first for the third consecutive time a 'Hottest 100 of All Time' has been held 1991, 1998 and 2009. This is the largest music poll in the world with more than half a million people voting.
- August 13: Kiss FM (Sri Lanka) is launched, broadcasting to the Colombo, Kandy and Coastal regions
- November 24: Virgin Radio Jordan 93.7 is launched at City Mall in Amman, Jordan.
- December 18: After 27 years, Irish broadcaster Sir Terry Wogan presents his final breakfast show on the UK's BBC Radio 2.

== Debuts ==
- January 5: De Cock Late Night, talk radio show on the Flemish radio MNM presented by Tom De Cock (ended in 2012)
- February 13: Club Nation, weekly show hosted by the Croatian/Dutch DJ duo Tezija & Keyra, launched on Splash FM.
- March 13: Inquilaab – The Story of Junoon, one-off documentary broadcast on City FM 89 in Pakistan.
- April: 96.3 Easy Rock begins broadcast in Pasay, Philippines under Manila Broadcasting Company.
- August 14: The Seduction of Ingmar Bergman, a radio musical written by Sparks and commissioned by Sweden's national broadcasting service, Sveriges Radio, is broadcast for the first time.
- December 14: Jeder Rappen zählt, charity fundraiser on Swiss radio and television
- date unknown: A hely ("The Place"), a programme that experiments with the presentation of events, phenomenon, places and professions from a very insider perspective, is launched on Kossuth Rádió in Hungary.

== Endings ==
- date unknown: Newsreader Bob Leahy gives up reading the news on New Zealand's Radio Network.
- 96.3 W Rock is ended for almost 21 years.

== Deaths ==
- January 13: Mansour Rahbani, Lebanese composer and radio producer, 83
- February 3: Jorge Serguera, former President of the Cuban Institute of Radio and Television, 76
- April 26: Barbara Birdfeather, American radio DJ, 69
- April 26: Geir Hovig, Norwegian radio presenter, 64
- July 2: Pasquale Borgomeo, director of Radio Vatican, 76
- July 16: D. K. Pattammal, Indian Carnatic musician who began her career on radio, 90
- July 21: Gangubai Hangal, Indian classical singer and All India Radio performer, 96
- October 4: Mercedes Sosa, Argentine singer who began her career on radio, 74
- October 9: Dré Steemans, Belgian television and radio host, 55 (cardiac arrest) (Dutch)
- October 31: Tim Bickerstaff, New Zealand broadcaster who pioneered talkback radio, 67
- November 7: Vic Davies, Australian radio presenter, 55 (lung cancer)
- November 20
  - Max Robertson, British sports commentator, 94
  - Roman Trakhtenberg, Russian actor, television and radio presenter, 41 (heart attack)
- December 11: Ciarán Mac Mathúna, Irish radio presenter and music collector, 84
