= Eritrea 16 =

Group of Eritrean journalists imprisoned since 2001

The Eritrea 16 is a group of 16 independent journalists living and working in Eritrea who were arrested following the government's ban on all private media on 18 September 2001, and who remain missing as of 2026. The journalists were not all linked; the first was arrested in 2000, over a year before the ban, and the last was arrested in 2005, four years later. They wrote for various news outlets, and some worked for the state broadcaster and even for the Eritrean government. While one of the arrested journalists, Fesshaye Yohannes, was confirmed to have died in 2007, the remaining journalists' official whereabouts and status remain unknown, with the Committee to Protect Journalists identifying 16 journalists as likely still being alive in 2026, when it awarded them its International Press Freedom Award in recognition of their "courage and sacrifice".

== Context ==
Eritrea became independent from Ethiopia in 1991, following a 30-year conflict. During the war, Dimtsi Hafash, a radio station first broadcast in 1979, supporting Eritrean independence and played an important role in the war. Dimtsi Hafash later became the state broadcaster following 1991. During the 1990s, restrictions were placed on the media by the government, including the 1996 Press Proclamation, banning private broadcast media, and requiring journalists and broadcasters to be licensed, in addition to banning foreign ownership of media and for all publications to be approved by the government prior to release.

At 07:30 on 18 September 2001, Solomon Abera announced on Dimtsi Hafash that the Eritrean government had ordered the closure of all privately owned newspapers in the country; he had been instructed to do so by Naizghi Kiflu, the Minister of Information. The decree led to the closure of newspapers including Meqaleh, Setit, Tiganay, Zemen, Wintana and Admas, with only the government-run Haddas Erta remaining in circulation.

The decision to ban all independent media, made by the President of Eritrea, Isaias Afwerki, was seen as a surprise both in Eritrea and internationally. Eritrean diplomat Girma Asmerom stated that the decision was made due to media outlets failing to comply with media licensing requirements, while Ali Abdu Ahmed, the head of Eritrea's national broadcaster, told the BBC it had been done to protect "national unity" after news outlets had been given time to "correct their mistakes". The Committee to Protect Journalists, citing anonymous sources in Asmara, reported that the silencing of free media was done to hide a crackdown on opponents of the ruling party, the People's Front for Democracy and Justice.

18 September 2001 later became known as Black Tuesday, due to the impact it had on press freedom in Eritrea.

== Detainees ==
While the group of journalists detained as a result of Black Tuesday have come to be collectively known as the Eritrea 16, they do not represent a uniform group; they were arrested at various points between 2000 and 2005, and worked for different newspapers and outlets. Additionally, some journalists were confirmed to either have died in custody (such as Fesshaye Yohannes) or to have been released (like Saadia Ahmed); while some other detainees likely have never been publicly identified. As of the 25th anniversary of Black Tuesday in 2026, the following journalists were identified by outlets such as the Committee to Protect Journalists and English PEN as being part of the Eritrea 16, on the basis that they were arrested following Black Tuesday (or in one case, before); had not been seen since; and that any reports of their deaths had not been confirmed.

Many of the Eritrea 16 wrote for newspapers that reported on infighting between the reformist and conservative factions within the People's Front for Democracy and Justice, such as Zemen, Meqaleh, Keste Dabana, Admas and Tsigenay. They also called for the full implementation of the Constitution of Eritrea. A number of them had also signed an open letter following Black Tuesday demanding clarification on the situation, delivered to the Ministry of Information on 21 September 2001.

=== Amanuel Asrat ===
Amanuel Aswat (Tigrinya: ኣማኑኤል ኣስራት; born 1971) was well known for his poetry, which included condemnation of the "scourge of war"; he was also the founder and editor of Zemen. One of the signatories of the open letter condemning Black Tuesday, Amanuel was arrested two days after the letter was delivered, on 23 September 2001.

=== Dawit Habtemichael ===
Dawit Habtemichael (Tigrinya: ዳዊት ሃብተሚካኤል) was the editor of Meqaleh. He was arrested on 24 September 2001, and was 30 years old at the time of his arrest.

=== Dawit Isaak ===
Dawit Isaak (Tigrinya: ዳዊት ኢሳቕ; born 1964) was an Eritrean-Swedish writer, who was the co-owner of Setit. He had sought asylum in Sweden in 1987, and became a Swedish citizen in 1992, before returning to Eritrea following its independence. Dawit was 37 years old when he was arrested on 23 September 2001..

=== Ghebrehiwet Keleta ===
Ghebrehiwet Keleta was a reporter for Tsigenay. His arrest, in July 2000 while he was travelling to work, occurred over a year before Black Tuesday. Ghebrehiwet has been considered to be the world's longest-detained journalist if he is still alive.

=== Hamid Mohamed Said ===
Hamid Mohamed Said was an editor for the Arabic-language service of the Eritrean state broadcaster Eri-TV. He was arrested in February 2002 at the age of 39. Amnesty International reported that Hamid had been arrested after calling for the greater prominence of Arabic in media programming, and for criticising the government's language policy.

=== Idris Said ===
Idris Said, also known by the pseudonym Abba Arre, was a civil servant at the Ministry of Labour and Human Welfare, alongside being a columnist for Tsigenay and Eritrea al-Haditha. He was arrested in October 2001, reportedly after writing an article criticising Eritrea's language policy, as well as for denouncing the wave of arrests that had occurred the previous month after Black Tuesday. Amnesty International noted that Idris was "severely disabled" at the time of his arrest, as a result of injuries obtained during the war for independence.

=== Jimi'ie Kimeil ===
Jimi'ie Kimeil was a sports reporters and investigative journalist for the Arabic newspaper Eritrea al-Haditha. Prior to his arrest, he had publicly criticised the government for providing a cross to a visiting Olympic committee, which he felt minimised Eritrea's religious diversity. Jimi'ie was arrested on 24 November 2005, four years after Black Tuesday.

=== Mattewos Habteab ===
Mattewos Habteab (Tigrinya: ማቴዎስ ሃብተኣብ) was the founder and editor of Meqaleh, having previously worked at Setit. He had been arrested previously, following an opinion piece in which he was critical of the Eritrean government's "disdain" for journalists during the war for independence, during which time he had been detained at Track B Prison in Asmara. 35 years old at the time of his arrest, Mattewos had been one of the signatories of the open letter criticising Black Tuesday.

=== Medhanie Haile ===
Medhanie Haile (Tigrinya: መድሃኔ ሃይለ) was the editor of the privately-owned Keste Debana, in addition to working as a lawyer at the Ministry of Justice. Much of his writing focused on the need to implement the rule of law in Eritrea. A signatory of the open letter against Black Tuesday, Medhanie was arrested on 23 September 2001 at the age of 33.

=== Said Abdelkader ===
Said Abdelkader was the editor of Admas and a signatory of the open letter against Black Tuesday. He was arrested on 23 September 2001 at the age of 34.

=== Saleh Aljazeeri ===
Saleh Aljazeeri was a journalist for the state news outlet Dimtsi Hafash as well as the independent Arabic newspaper Eritrea al-Haditha. He was arrested in February 2002. Amnesty International reported that Saleh had been arrested after calling for the greater prominence of Arabic in media programming, and for criticising the government's language policy.

=== Sahle Tsegazeab ===
Sahle Tsegazeab (Tigrinya: ሳህለ ጸጋዘኣብ) worked as a civil servant in the Attorney General's Office, and wrote articles for the state-owned Haddas Ertra newspaper. After experiencing censorship, Sahle began writing for Zemen under the pseudonym Wedi Itay. He was arrested in October 2001, shorlty before he planned to move to South Africa to study.

=== Seyoum Tsehaye ===
Seyoum Tsehaye (Tigrinya: ስዩም ጸሃየ; born 1952) was a war photographer before becoming the founding director of Eritrea's state broadcaster Eri-TV in 1993. After leaving his role, Seyoum became a photojournalist and freelance contributor to Setit, and was often critical of the Eritrean government. He was arrested on 21 September 2001, reportedly after writing an article expressing concern for press freedom in Eritrea.

=== Temesgen Ghebreyesus ===
Temesgen Ghebreyesus (Tigrinya: ተመስገን ገብረየሱስ) was the sports editor for Keste Debena, a privately-owned Tigrinya-language newspaper. He was arrested on 23 September 2001 at the age of 36.

=== Tesfay Ghebreab ===
Tesfay Ghebreab, also known as Gomora, was a director within the Ministry of Foreign Affairs, as well as a freelance contributor for Setit. He was arrested in September 2001, reportedly after writing an article calling on the reformist and conservative factions within the People's Front for Democracy and Justice to negotiate with one another.

=== Yusuf Mohamed Ali ===
Yusuf Mohamed Ali was the editor in chief of Tsigenay. He had previously been arrested on 14 October 2000 at Zara Prison for criticising the government. After signing the open letter against Black Tuesday, Yusuf was arrested on 23 September 2001 at the age of 46.

== Subsequent events ==
=== 2001-2009 ===
None of the Eritrea 16 have been formally charged or convicted of any crimes, and their whereabouts, as well as whether they are alive or dead, remains unconfirmed by Eritrean authorities. In the years since their disappearances, various Eritreans living in exile have shared information about the journalists, though the secrecy of the Eritrean regime has meant much of this information remains unverifiable.

Saadia Ahmed, an Arabic-language journalist who had been arrested alongside Hamid Mohamed Said and Saleh Aljazeeri in February 2002, was subsequently released; she was among the only known female journalists arrested following Black Tuesday.

While the whereabouts of the Eritrea 16 have never been definitively concerned, it was stated that at least some of them were held at Carcelli Prison in Asmara. On 31 March 2002, those who had been detained up to that point began a hunger strike, and were able to successfully smuggle a message out of the prison calling for due process. As a result, the prisoners were transferred to various unknown locations, including Eiraeiro prison and Adi Abeito military prison. The Eritrean government has given various explanations, at times contradictory, for the Eritrea 16's arrests, including them being involved in anti-state conspiracies connected to foreign intelligence; avoiding military service; and violating officials. Paulos Netabay of the Eritrean News Agency said in 2018 that they ahd been detained for "acts of subversion and treason"; while other officials have claimed that the journalists "did not exist".

In April 2002, it was reported that Dawit Isaak had been hospitalised as a result of torture. On 19 November 2005, Dawit was reportedly released from prison for medical reasons, but was arrested two days later and has remained detained since, reportedly in solitary confinement in Eiraeiro.

In 2006, Radio Erena reported that Saleh Aljazeeri had been seen alive in prison.

In 2009, Isaias Afwerki acknowledged one of the Eritrea 16 publicly for the first time, when he said that he "didn't know" why Dawit Isaak had been arrested, though he later said Dawit had made a "big mistake" without providing further information about what this was. Isaias added that Dawit would not have a trial and would not be released. The following year, presidential advisor Yemane Gebreab said that Dawit was being held for "very serious crimes regarding Eritrea’s national security and survival as an independent state".

=== 2010-2019 ===
In 2010, a prison guard in exile reported that Amanuel Asrat was still being held at Eiraeiro prison alongside at least three other members of the Eritrea 16, including Seyoum Tsehaye. Exiled journalists reported that Ghebrehiwet Keleta had been released from prison, though in 2013, another journalist said his daughter had informed him that Ghebrehiwet remained in prison. Also in 2013, another exiled journalist reported Hamid Mohamed Said remained in custody.

In 2016, in the most open communication from the Eritrean government about the Eritrea 16, Osman Saleh stated that all the detainees were alive and "in good hands", and would be tried at a time the government deemed appropriate. This followed the African Commission on Human and Peoples' Rights' call on Eritrean authorities to release the Eritrea 16 or otherwise provide a "speedy and fair trial", as well as offering compensation and for them to see their families. That year, Voice of America reported that Seyoum Tsehaye was alive but that his hands were bound "24 hours a day".

=== 2020–present ===
In 2021, two United Nations special rapporteurs stated they had received information from a credible source that Dawit Isaak was alive in Eiraeiro as of September 2020.

In 2023, Seyoum Tsehaye's daughter Beilula said the family had not received any information about him since his arrest in 2001.

In October 2024, Swedish authorities began investigating Afwerki and other Eritrean officials in connection to Dawit Isaak, a Swedish citizen, following complaints by the Swedish chapter of Reporters Without Borders about his detention. In December 2025, after visiting Eritrea, Swedish foreign minister Maria Malmer Stenergard said Sweden had assessed that Dawit Isaak was still alive, though his daughters Betlehem and Danait expressed frustration that no proof of life was provided by Eritrean officials.

== Reported deaths ==
Since the arrests of the Eritea 16, various unverified reports have been made that some of the journalists had died in custody. The only confirmed death of a detainee remains Fesshaye Yohannes, who died in 2007.

In 2006, a former prison guard in Eiraero told the pro-government website Aigaforum that 14 prisoners had died in the prison, including providing a name that was similar to Yusuf Mohamed Ali. In 2007, Radio Erena and PEN Eritrea reported that Jimi'ie Kimeil had died in prison, though the Committee to Protect Journalists stated it was unable to confirm this was correct; the Eritean government declined to confirm whether he had been detained or if he had died.

In 2009, the United Kingdom-based opposition news website Assena published the purported death certificates of four prisoners, including Medhanie Haile and Yusuf Mohamed Ali. Unverified reports have stated that Dawit Habtemichael, Mattewos Habteab and Sahle Tsegazeab died in custody, with Habtemichael said to have died in 2010 in Eiraeiro from "mental illness", while Sahle was reported to have died due to a lack of medical treatment.

In 2010, Eyob Bahta Habtemariam, an Eritrean exile who claimed to have been a prison guard, reported that Medhanie Haile had died due to a lack of medical care, and that Mattewos Habteab had also died while in Eiraeiro prison.

== Recognition ==
At the 2015 PEN International Congress in Quebec City, Canada, a chair was left empty for Amanuel Asrat.

In 2023, the Raoul Wallenberg Centre for Human Rights in Canada called for information about four of the detained, including Amanuel Asrat, Dawit Habtemichael and Seyoum Tsehaye.

In May 2024, the United Nations' special rappourteur described the Eritrea 16 as being the "longest-detained journalists in the world". In November 2024, Dawit Isaak received the Edelstam Prize for exception courage in defending human rights.

In 2026, the Committee to Protect Journalists reiterated its call for Eritrean authorities to disclose the fate and whereabouts of the Eritrea 16, to mark the 25th anniversary since their disappearances, as well as proof of life. In August, the CPJ announced the Eritrea 16 would receive the International Press Freedom Award, in recognition of their "courage and sacrifice". They were honoured in absentia at a ceremony in New York City, United States, on 19 November. That same month, Eritrean writer Fisseha Yirgalem memorialised the Eritrea 16 while giving the Carlos Cardoso memorial lecture at the African Investigative Journalism Conference in Nairobi, Kenya, including her memories of her friend and colleague, Amanuel Asrat on what would have been his 50th birthday. At the talk, 15 empty chairs held portraits of the journalists painted by Gianluca Costantini. Beilula Sium, the daughter of Seyoum Tsehaye, also spoke at the conference about the only time she met her father, during a prison visit two months after his arrest.
