= Telecommunications in Eritrea =

Telecommunications in Eritrea are regulated and operated primarily by Eritrea Telecommunication Services Corporation (EriTel), a Government of Eritrea organization. The country's telecommunications infrastructure includes fixed-line telephone, mobile telephone, and Internet services. Access to telecommunications services remains limited, and the sector has been affected by restrictions on private-sector competition, limited infrastructure, and government control over communications.

== Infrastructure ==
The Eritrea Telecommunication Services Corporation, more commonly known as EriTel, is the sole operator of both landline and mobile telephone communication infrastructure in Eritrea. However, it is one of several internet service providers in the country.

The domestic telecommunications infrastructure is very inadequate. Most fixed line telephones are located in Asmara, the capital and largest city. Cell phones are in increasing use throughout the country. The government is seeking international tenders to improve the system.

On 13 April 2006, Eritrea received a soft loan from the government of China to upgrade their communication infrastructure. The total sum loaned to EriTel was $23 million. All major cities are connected to the mobile telephone system in Eritrea except for Assab, as of 2023.

== Telephone ==
- Fixed phones in use: 58,500 lines, 159th in the world (2011).
- Mobile cellular phones in use: 241,900 lines, 175th in the world (2011).
- Combined fixed-line and mobile-cellular subscribership is less than 5 per 100 persons (2011).
- International country code: 291.

== Radio and television ==
- The government controls all broadcast media with private ownership prohibited. Purchases of satellite dishes and subscriptions to international broadcast media are permitted.
- Radio networks: 2 state-owned (2007).
- TV stations: 1 state-owned (2007).

== Internet ==
- Internet users: 48,692 users, 180th in the world; 0.8% of the population, 211th in the world (2012).
- Fixed broadband: 122 subscriptions, 192nd (last) in the world; 0.0% of the population, 192nd (last) in the world (2012).
- Mobile broadband: unknown.
- Internet hosts: 701 hosts, 177th in the world (2012).
- Internet service providers (ISPs): 4 (2005) - EriTel, CTS, TFanus, Ewan.
- Country code: ER
- Top level domain: .er

=== Internet censorship and surveillance ===
- Listed as Under Surveillance by Reporters Without Borders (RWB) in 2008, 2009, not in 2010, and again from 2011 to 2012.

Eritrea has not set up a widespread automatic Internet filtering system, but it does not hesitate to order blocking of several diaspora websites critical of the regime. Access to these sites is blocked by two of the Internet service providers, Erson and Ewan, as are pornographic websitesand YouTube. Self-censorship is said to be widespread.

== See also ==
- Media of Eritrea
- Freedom of press in Eritrea
