= Mass media in Eritrea =

There are no current independent mass media in Eritrea. All media outlets in Eritrea are from the Ministry of Information, a government source.

Western media was brought to the country during Italian and British colonialism. The media in Eritrea played a role in its war against Ethiopia. Independent Eritrea has one of the harshest media regimes, with private and foreign ownership being banned since the early 2000s. As of 2018, the government controlled four newspapers, one television channel and two radio stations. International organizations such as Reporters Without Borders and Freedom House have consistently labelled the media in Eritrea as "not free", ranking it as the lowest or one of the lowest countries in press freedom indices. Access to the internet is very limited.

== History ==
Italian and British colonialism brought western journalism to the region. It then fell into the hands of the Ethiopian rulers. During Eritrea's independence movement, media such as radio Dmtsi Hafash (transl. Voice of the Broad Masses), first broadcast in early 1979 from Fah and Sahel, played a revolutionary role. Dmtsi Hafash continues to broadcast.

In 1996, the Eritrean government passed a law banning private broadcast media and requiring licenses for journalists and newspapers. The law barred the reprinting of works from banned publications, outlawed foreign ownership of media, and required all publications to be submitted to the government for approval prior to publication. In 2001, in an effort to quell burgeoning dissent about the future of the People's Front for Democracy and Justice, the government closed down eight independent newspapers and arrested an undisclosed number of journalists.

Onwards from 18 September 2001, the government banned all private media. The newspapers affected included Meqaleh, Setit, Tiganay, Zemen, Wintana, Admas, Keste Debena, and Mana. Official reasons for the ban included national security, and failure to comply with media laws and regulations. 2001 also saw an unknown number of journalists being detained, some who are still thought to be imprisoned, known collectively as the Eritrea 16. Even before the arrests, journalists were facing conscription, which HRW explained as an attempt to clamp down on the media.

== Print ==
There are two daily print newspapers:

- Al-Hadisa (Arabic language)
- Haddas Eritrea (Tigrinya language)

There are also two other papers:

- Eritrea Profile, twice weekly (Wednesday & Saturday) (English language)
- Eritrea Haddas, weekly (Wednesday) (Tigre language)

A defunct newspaper:

- Nay Eretra Sämunawi Gazét'a (1942–1953)

== Radio ==
There are three radio stations in Eritrea. Radio Bana is an educational radio broadcast in five languages. Radio Zara is available only in Tigrinya, while Dimtsi Hafash is available in nine languages: Afar, Arabic, Beja, Blin, Kunama, Nara, Saho, Tigre, Tigrinya.

Dimtsi Hafash and Radio Zara are available via satellite dish.

Radio Erena is a Paris-based radio station that broadcasts news in Eritrea.

== Television ==
There are two television stations in the country, with a third having been announced in 2006. Eri-TV1, more commonly known as Eri-TV, is available globally through satellite while Eri-TV2 is only available in Eritrea; both are operated by the Ministry of Information from Asmara. Eri-TV has fully featured programming in four languages: Arabic, English, Tigre, Tigrinya; as well as some programming in other languages including Amharic, Oromo and Somali.

Eri-TV is available within Eritrea and abroad via satellite dish 24 hours a day. Many of the television owners in Eritrea use satellite dishes.

== Diaspora online media ==
Online media of the Eritrean diaspora play a major role in Eritrean politics according to researcher Victoria Bernal.

- Dehai, created in 1992, tending to be pro-government
- Asmarino, created in 1997, tending to be anti-government
- Awate, created following the Eritrean–Ethiopian War, tending to be anti-government

== See also ==
- Communications in Eritrea
- Human rights in Eritrea
- Yirgalem Fisseha Mebrahtu
