= Inquilaab – The Story of Junoon =

- Genre: Documentary
- Running time: 44 minutes and 04 seconds
- Country of origin: Pakistan
- Languages: English; Urdu
- Home station: City FM 89
- Starring: Junoon
- Produced by: City FM 89
- Narrated by: Omar Bilal Akhtar
- Original release: March 13, 2009
- Website: City FM 89 – Hall of Fame

Inquilaab – The Story of Junoon is a 44-minute radio broadcast documentary presented by Omar Bilal Akhtar, broadcast on City FM 89, on March 13, 2009. The documentary explores the journey of the rock music band Junoon and the struggle they faced to become a well known band in South Asia and beyond.

== Synopsis ==
The documentary follows the journey of the South Asian rock music band Junoon and the struggle they face to become one of the biggest band in the world. Salman Ahmad, lead guitarist, parted ways the most successful pop band of Pakistan, Vital Signs as he wanted a change in the band's music for their second album and therefore after leaving the band he went on to form his own band. First, he roped in singer Ali Azmat from the Jupiters and then the former Vital Signs lead guitarist, Nusrat Hussain, on keyboards. The name of band comes from when Salman had a dream where one of his teachers shook him and said "Tumhey mousiqui ka Junoon hai!" (You have an obsession with music!). The band then released their self-titled debut album Junoon in 1991, which barely made a dent in the Pakistani music industry when released in 1991. After the release of their debut album, Nusrat Hussain parted ways with the band to pursue his professional career. After the departure of Nusrat, Salman contacted Brian O'Connell and invited him to play bass on the band's second album. In 1993, Junoon released their second album Talaash which began to create a cult of a following for the band. Singles from the album, such as "Talaash", were politically influenced and became subject to censorship, which led to the eventual ban from all state run television and radio during the rule of by then the Pakistani Prime Minister, Nawaz Sharif.

After a gap of four years the band released their third album Inquilaab by which Junoon started to gain success and began to reach a wider audience when one of their singles, "Jazba-e-Junoon". in 1997, Junoon released their fourth studio album, Azadi, which was the band's first international record deal which led the band win many international music awards and they were now recognized internationally. After two year, Junoon then released their fifth studio album, Parvaaz, which was recorded and mixed at Abbey Road Studios in London and was hailed by many critics as the finest work by Junoon. The band then released their sixth studio album in 2001, Andaz and then releasing their seventh studio album, Dewaar in 2007. After the release of the album Brian O'Connell went back to United States. Salman Ahmad and Ali Azmat both went on to pursue their career as solo singers.

== Reception ==
Inquilaab – The Story of Junoon aired on March 13, 2009 on City FM 89 in Pakistan was inducted into the City FM 89 Hall of Fame.
