= Papito =

Papito may refer to:

- Papito (album), by Spanish pop singer Miguel Bosé
- "Papito", a song by Manu Chao from the album Próxima Estación: Esperanza
- Papito, nickname for Jorge Serguera, the head of the Cuban Institute of Radio and Television
