= Freedom of press in Eritrea =

Overview of freedom of media in Eritrea

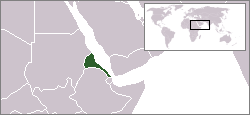
Location of Eritrea

The freedom of speech is the right to communicate one's opinions and ideas, nominally guaranteed by the Eritrean constitution. In practice, Eritrea has received some of the worst rankings in RSF's press freedom index. As of 2004, the press in Eritrea under the government led by Isaias Afwerki remained tightly controlled.

== Legal status ==
The Eritrean government passed several laws to limit press freedom in its country. In 1996, a law was passed banning media broadcasts and journalists, who now need licenses to be able to work. In 2001, all independent media were banned, leaving state media as the sole alternative. Furthermore, among limitations, "media publications must be submitted for government approval prior to release" according to Freedom House.

Since 2001, several journalists were arrested without any charges according to the Committee to Protect Journalists (CPJ), including 17 journalists who were imprisoned in Eritrea as of 1 December 2015. Among the most recent imprisonments, in 2011 four journalists working for the government radio and television station (Dimtsi Hafash) were arrested and imprisoned. There is no information on the condition of those imprisoned; many are believed to have died since, even though there is in either case no confirmation. In 2014, lawyers tried to press Swedish courts to investigate crimes against humanity, torture, and abduction, because of the imprisonment of the Swedish-Eritrean journalist Dawit Isaak according to the Committee to Protect Journalist. Eritrean authorities refused to cooperate and the case was closed. While there have been reports that Isaak died in detention in 2011, this has not been confirmed, and other reports claim that he may be alive in 2015.

== Political status ==
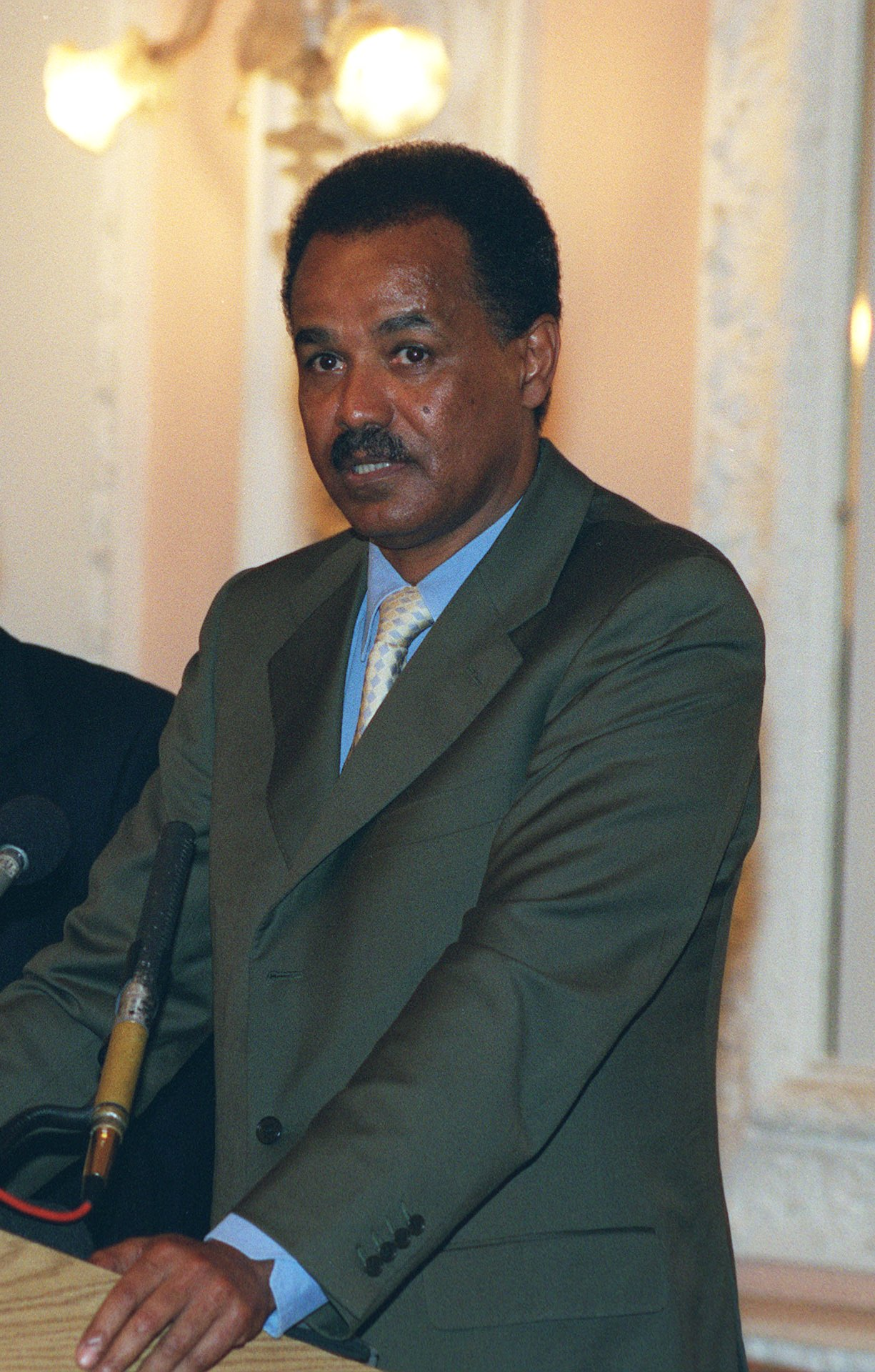
Eritrean President, Isaias Afwerki in 2002

The majority of journalists have fled Eritrea due to the intimidation and arbitrary imprisonment. Furthermore, the journalists who have remained abide and engage in self-censorship. However, in 2013, a dissident group began creating and circulating an underground newspaper, Echoes of Forto, in Asmara. The newspaper is written by a team based both inside and outside the country. The disagreeing group described the paper as a pilot project, and hoped to expand it.

Radio Erena, both run by Eritrean activists and Reporters Without Borders (RSF) from Paris, was launched in 2009. It can be accessed through the internet, satellite, and a "call-to-listen" platform. Although Eritrea has one of the lowest internet infiltration rates in the world, at around 1 percent, the government still makes an effort to block many websites managed by Eritrean exiles. It is believed that authorities monitor e-mail communications and some users suspect that government informants track users' activity in internet cafés.

As of 2004, foreign journalists were not accepted in Eritrea unless they were willing to report positively about the country and its politics. Several journalists have entered the country undercover and on rare occasions the Eritrean president accepted to do interviews for TV channels such as Al-Jazeera or Sweden TV. However, in 2013, the Eritrean government blocked Al-Jazeera for two weeks because of its coverage of demonstrations in front of the country's embassies in different cities such as London, Rome, and Stockholm.

== Personal cases ==
Following laws passed censoring media and press, many journalists have been detained since 2001.

=== Dawit Habtemichael ===
Dawit was a teacher and journalist who was imprisoned without any charges in 2001. He was considered by his former colleagues at the newspaper Echo as a talented, critical and hard worker. He co-founded an independent newspaper, Meqaleh, where he wrote critical articles in his regular column Never too late. He was soon detained by the police at the school where he worked. According to Reporters Without Borders, Dawit died in prison in 2010 with the magazine's editor Matios Habteab.

=== Dawit Isaak ===
Dawit Isaak is a Swedish-Eritrean journalist and writer who was imprisoned in 2001 by the Eritrean government without trial. His first job in Eritrea was as a reporter for the country's first independent newspaper, Setit.

He was arrested at his home in Asmara. In April 2002, CPJ reported that Dawit had to be hospitalized due to torture. In November 2005 he was released from jail, but two days after that he was imprisoned again. Rumors about his death have circulated several times, but it is not known if he is still alive or he is dead.

=== Fessayah "Joshua" Yohannes ===
He was a poet, circus performer and short story writer. According to Aaron Berhane, Yohannes was known to be amicable, friendly and reliable. Along with other editors of Eritrea, Yohannes was arrested on September 23, 2001, at his home. There are statements that he died in 2006 or 2007, due to health problems.

=== Idris Abu'Are ===
Idris Abu’Are was a critical thinker who public readings and seminars on the history of the Eritrean independence. After 1991, Abu’Are worked in the Ministry of Foreign Affairs and regularly contributed to the government-run daily newspaper Eritrea al-Haditha.

Idris became very critical of the ministry, and later he worked for the newspaper Tsigenay and published a collection of short stories in 1992. However, he was blacklisted by the government for his ideas and was arrested in October 2001. He is married and has one daughter and he remains in prison.

=== Yirgalem Fisseha Mebrahtu ===
On February 9, 2009, Yirgalem Fisseha Mebrahtu was arrested with about 30 other people in the radio station building; she was the only woman among those arrested. She was accused of having ties to foreign media; other arbitrary charges included allegedly plotting to assassinate the President and belittling politicians. She spent the first two years in solitary confinement in Mai Swra prison, where she was also tortured.

== See also ==
- Mass media in Eritrea
- Human rights in Eritrea
