= Millennium 1990–2000 =

Compilation album by Junoon
- Released: 2000
- Recorded: 1991–1999 at Nyack Studios, New York, United States
- Genre: Sufi rock
- Producers: John Alec, Salman Ahmad

Junoon chronology
Parvaaz (1999)	Millennium 1990–2000 (2000)	The Videos 1990–2000 (2000)

Millennium 1990–2000 is the second compilation album and the seventh overall album released by Pakistani rock band, Junoon. It was released in 2000. The album features some of the best known songs of the band. It also includes live versions of the songs "Allah Hu", and "Lal Meri Pat". It includes emotive song "Azadi" from the movie based on the life of Quaid-e-Azam Mohammad Ali Jinnah, the founder of Pakistan. The song is a tribute to Jinnah and his work towards the creation of Pakistan. "Azadi" is followed by Neend Ati Nhin one of Junoon's early hits. It also features sufi songs such as Ghoom which has an emotive guitar solo and emotive vocals. Also included is Junoon's patriotic song Jazba-e-Junoon which was released as a single for the 1996 Cricket World Cup. Released in 2000, the album was received well in Pakistan.

== Track listings ==
All music written & composed by Salman Ahmad and Sabir Zafar.

1. Azadi (For "JINNAH" The Movie)
2. Neend Aati Nahin
3. Maine Kabhi
4. Khwab
5. Rooh Ki Pyaas
6. Mahi
7. Jazba-e-Junoon
8. Muk Gay Nay
9. Ghoom
10. Sajna
11. Yaar Bina
12. Lal Meri Pat (Live)
13. Allah Hu (Live)

== The Videos 1990–2000 ==
The Videos 1990–2000

Video by Junoon
- Released: 2000
- Recorded: 1991–2000
- Genre: Rock
- Producers: Salman Ahmad; Brian O'Connell

Junoon chronology
Millennium 1990-2000 (2000)	The Videos 1990–2000 (2000)	Andaz (2001)

Junoon released a similar album in the year 2000 to celebrate their 10th anniversary as a band. The Videos 1990–2000 is the third compilation album and the eighth overall album of the band. The album contains the music videos of all the songs, present in Millennium 1990–2000.
