= Vanessa Tsehaye =

Swedish-Eritrean activist

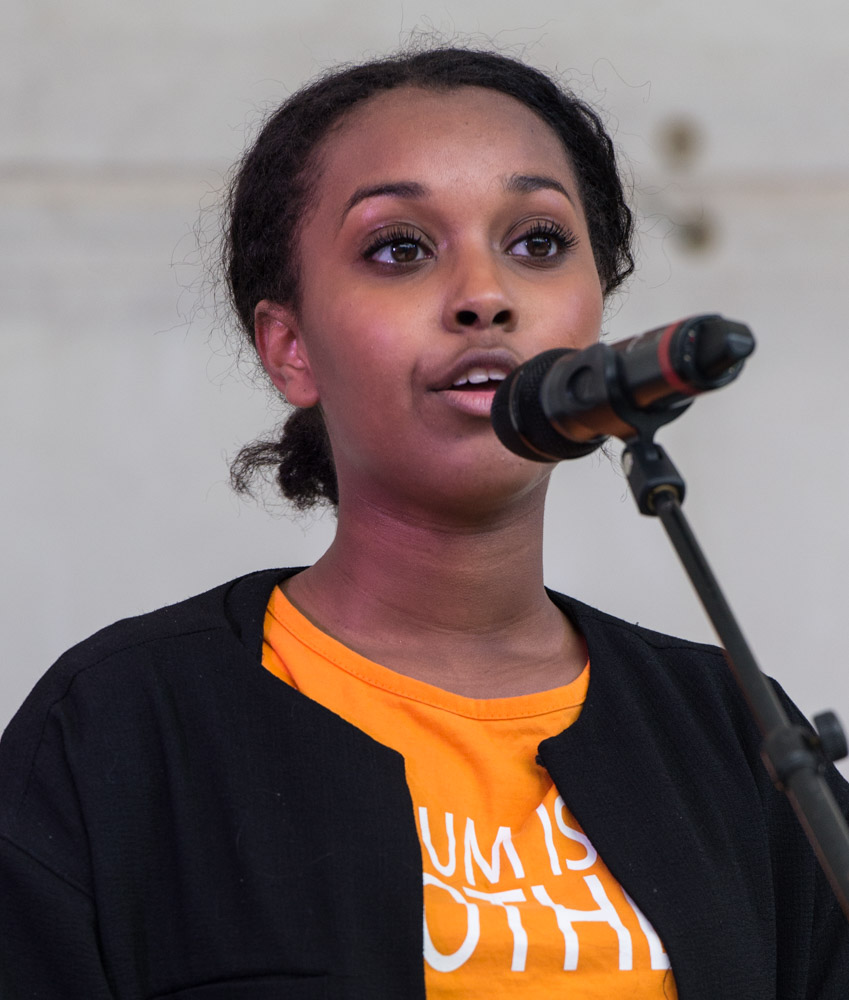
- Tsehaye in 2015
- Born: 1996; Sweden
- Alma mater: SOAS University of London; Villanova University
- Occupation: Human rights defender

Vanessa Tsehaye (formerly Vanessa Berhe) is a Swedish–Eritrean human rights activist.

== Early life ==
Vanessa Tsehaye was born to Eritrean parents in 1996 in Sweden, where she grew up. In 2001, Tsehaye was told about the arrest of her maternal uncle Seyoum Tsehaye, a former head of Eritrean public television Eri-TV. Tsehaye describes being perplexed by the arrest. She started to collect money at her high school, hoping to pay for a rescue flight to Eritrea. These events catalyzed her interest in campaigning for Eritrean human rights.

=== Education and early career ===
Vanessa graduated in law from SOAS University of London c.2019. She served as an assistant producer for The Listening Post from June 2018 to January 2020.

== Human rights activism ==
In 2013, Tsehaye started the One Day Seyoum campaign to guarantee human rights in Eritrea, and free Eritrean political prisoners, including Sehoum; she continues to serve as the executive director. Tsehaye described the aims of her campaign stating,

The story is so much bigger than Seyoum, bigger than a couple of individuals. Today, all critical voices are silenced. Terrible stories about human rights atrocities are not heard. We want to tell the stories that Seyoum would have told, were he free.

— Vanessa Tsehaye, Al Jazeera English, 2015

The campaign picked up pace since 2018, after the Eritrea–Ethiopia Peace Summit. In 2021, she launched the 2001 Magazine to chronicle life in Eritrea.

=== Recognition ===
In 2019, Asmarino described Tsehaye as "one of the most prominent human rights activists Eritrea has ever known." As of 2021, Tsehaye is a campaigner of Amnesty International for the Horn of Africa.

== Viewpoints ==
Tsehaye has called out the (ab)use of postcolonial rhetoric to deflect criticisms off Eritrea.

In February 2021, Tsehaye objected to the blocking of humanitarian access in the Tigray War, arguing that bureaucracy was slowing down some requests and refusing others, in violation of the obligations of international humanitarian law. She stated that the communications blockade made it difficult for worldwide attention to focus on the war.

In 2018, Tsehaye objected to the use of the 1998–2000 Eritrean–Ethiopian War as a "justification for turning [Eritrea] into a dictatorship". She objected to Eritrean indefinite military service, to systematic rape, torture and other crimes, to the National Assembly not convening since 2002, to the non-implementation of the Constitution of Eritrea and to arrest without trial.
