= .er =

Internet country code top-level domain for Eritrea

- Introduced: 24 September 1996
- TLD type: Country code top-level domain
- Status: Active
- Registry: EriTel
- Sponsor: Ministry of Transport and Communications
- Intended use: Entities connected with Eritrea
- Actual use: Very few in use; no known registry site
- Registered domains: <70 (2020)
- Structure: Registrations are at third level beneath names such as .com.er and .org.er
- DNSSEC: Yes

.er is the country code top-level domain (ccTLD) for Eritrea.

== 2nd level domains ==
Some second level domains do exist; however their exact expected purposes and possible restrictions are unconfirmed.

- com.er, likely for commercial entities/businesses
- edu.er, likely for educational institutions
- gov.er, reserved for the Eritrean government
- mil.er, reserved for the Eritrean military; empty zone (unchanged since August 2004)
- net.er, likely for network operators/providers
- org.er, likely for nonprofit organisations
- ind.er, likely for Eritrean individuals; empty zone (unchanged since August 2004)
