= Ehtesaab =

Single by Junoon

from the album Kashmakash
- Released: December 1996
- Recorded: 1994
- Genre: Alternative rock
- Length: 2:32 (album version); 2:32 (video)
- Label: EMI Pakistan
- Songwriter: Salman Ahmad
- Producers: Brian O'Connell, Salman Ahmad

Junoon singles chronology
| "Jazba-e-Junoon" (1996) | "Ehtesaab" (1996) | "Saeein" (1997) |

"Ehtesaab" (Urdu: احتساب, lit. 'Accountability') is the second track on the 1995 compilation album Kashmakash by the Pakistani sufi rock band Junoon, and the second single from the album. Following the band's first major hit single "Jazba-e-Junoon", which was the song of the 1996 Cricket World Cup, "Ehtesaab" was their second hit and was released in December 1996. The video of the single was directed by Pakistani director, Shoaib Mansoor.

The controversial video release of the song mocked Pakistani politics and led to the video of the song being banned on PTV, Pakistan's State television. The video of the single also featured in BBC film The Princess and the Playboy, an exposé on Benazir's and her husband's reign. In Newsweek, Carla Power dedicated a full-page story to Junoon with the headline "For God and Country."

== Music video ==
The blunt, hard-hitting "Ehtesaab" video shows Pakistani children working backbreaking menial jobs, juxtaposed with fictional politicians gorging themselves at five-star hotels. It also includes a scene in which a horse is dining at a luxury hotel (an apparent reference to polo ponies kept by Benzair Bhutto's spouse Asif Zardari). Those mares ate better than many of Pakistan's poor. In air conditioned stables, no less.

== Controversies ==
Junoon faced challenges from the Pakistani government following the controversial video release of the single which included footage of a polo pony eating at a posh restaurant. Many thought that the image was an indictment of the corrupt Pakistani political elite, and especially of former Prime Minister Benazir Bhutto. The government quickly banned the song and video from the state television.

In 1997, Junoon went on their first Indian tour. The band's first concert was held in New Delhi, India. After travelling throughout the country, Junoon saw crowds of as many as of 50,000 fans at different venues. The band was courted for a controversy during their tour to India by the Pakistani government. The Indian government was testing nuclear devices at that time, and Salman Ahmad suggested that the Indian and Pakistani leaders should spend more on education and health and less on weapons. This led to a prolonged ban on Junoon's music by the Pakistani government. PTV, the Pakistan state television, refused to show the audience even clips from Junoon releases. The Ministry of Culture charged Junoon with making comments in India amounting to sedition and treason. The band members denied these charges reminding people of the fact that they had been victimised since the release of "Ehtesaab" because they chose to speak out against political corruption.

== Track listing ==
Ehtesaab

All tracks are written by Junoon.

| No. | Title | Length |
|---|---|---|
| 1. | "Ehtesaab" | 2:32 |
| 2. | "Ehtesaab" (Video) | 2:32 |

== Personnel ==
Junoon

- Ali Azmat - lead vocals, backing vocals
- Salman Ahmad - backing vocals, lead guitar
- Brian O'Connell - bass guitar, backing vocals

Featuring Artist

- vocals by Najam Sheraz

== Published sources ==
- Salman Ahmad (2010), Rock & Roll Jihad: A Muslim Rock Star’s Revolution for Peace, Free Press. ISBN 978-1-4165-9767-4.
