= Meri Awaz Suno =

Single by Junoon

from the album Azadi
- Released: 1995 (re-released in 1997)
- Recorded: 1995
- Genre: Sufi rock Hard rock
- Length: 5:32 (album version); 4:48 (music video)
- Label: EMI Pakistan, Sadaf Stereo
- Songwriters: Sabir Zafar, Salman Ahmad
- Producers: John Alec, Salman Ahmad

Junoon singles chronology
"Talaash" (1996)	"Meri Awaz Suno" (1995)	"Jazba-e-Junoon" (1996)

"Meri Awaz Suno" (Urdu: میری آواز سنو, literal English translation: "listen to my voice") is a song by the Pakistani sufi rock band Junoon, released in 1995. It is the second track from the band's fourth album, Azadi (1997), released on EMI Records. Written by poet Sabir Zafar and lead guitarist Salman Ahmad, it remains one of the band's more popular songs.

The song has also been featured in several other albums by the band, including Kashmakash (1995) and Dewaar: The Best of Junoon (2004).

== Music video ==
The music video of "Meri Awaz Suno" was shot at the Jazba-e-Junoon weekend show, a patriotic show. The 4:48-minute music video showcased the band's entire line-up at several different camera shots, mostly focused on the three band members. The video also showed some of the session players playing along with the band, such as Ustad Aashiq Ali playing the tabla.

== Track listing ==
Meri Awaz Suno

All tracks are written by Junoon.

No.	Title	Length
1.	"Meri Awaz Suno"	5:32
2.	"Meri Awaz Suno" (Video)	4:48

== Personnel ==
Junoon

- Salman Ahmad - vocals, lead guitar
- Ali Azmat - vocals, backing vocals
- Brian O'Connell - bass guitar, backing vocals

Additional musicians

- Ustad Aashiq Ali - Tambourin, Tabla
