= Tanja Kinkel =

German writer (born 1969)

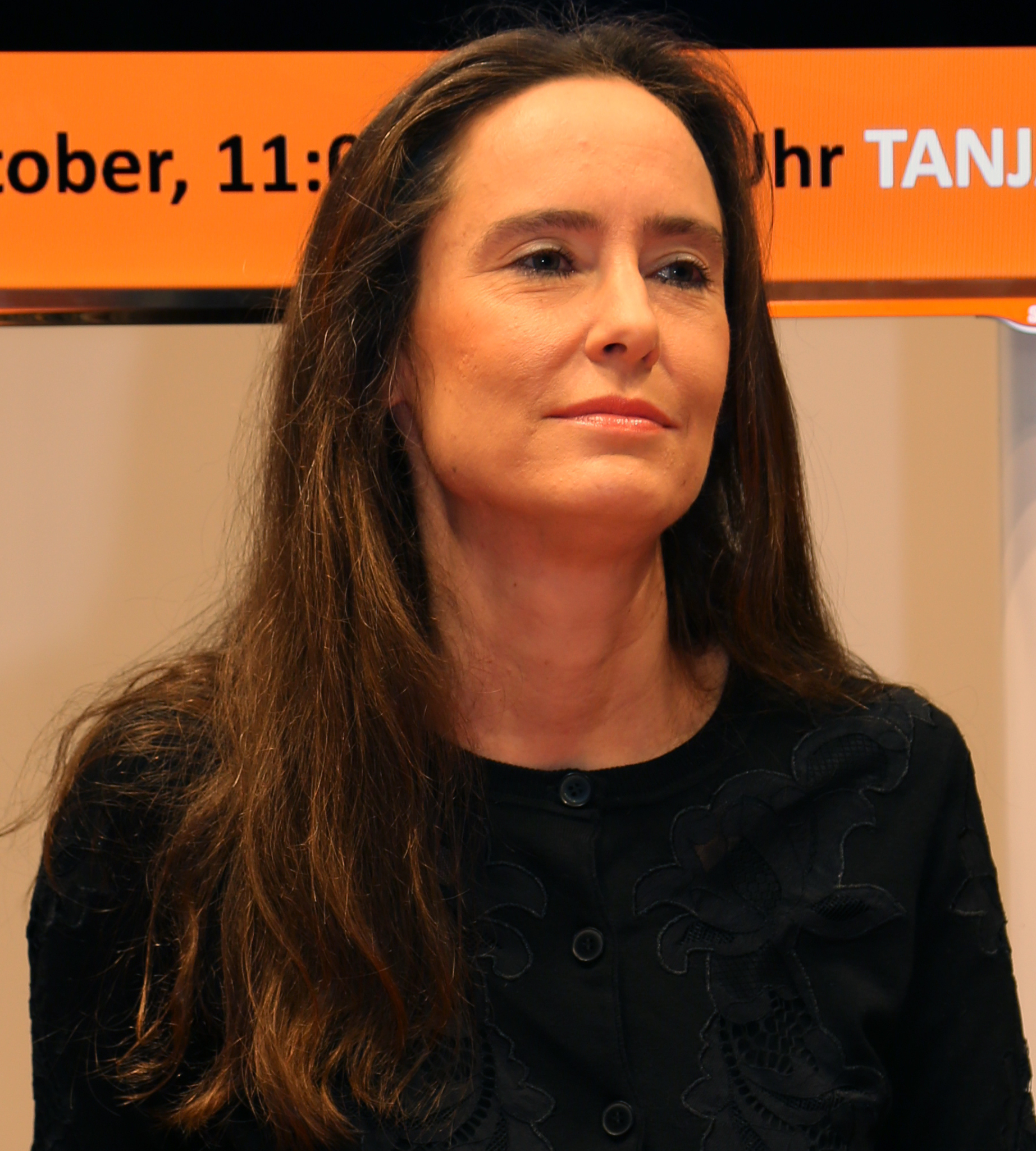
- Kinkel in 2015
- Born: September 27, 1969 (age 56); Bamberg, Germany
- Occupation: Writer

Tanja Kinkel (born 27 September 1969) is a German writer who is known primarily as the author of several historical novels. She lives in Munich.

== Life and work ==
Tanja Kinkel grew up in Bamberg and began writing stories and poems at the age of eight. In 1978, she won a youth literature prize and in 1979 she wrote her first novel. In 1987, she received first prize in the Franconian Youth Literature Competition for the best individual text.

After graduating from the Kaiser-Heinrich-Gymnasium in Bamberg, she began studying German, theater and communication studies at LMU Munich in 1988. In 1991, Kinkel received a scholarship at the University of Television and Film Munich, which she used to study screenwriting. This was followed in 1992 by a sponsorship award from the Free State of Bavaria for young writers. In the same year she founded the registered association "Bread and Books", which promotes the education of children in Africa, Germany and India. In 1995, she was sponsored by the German Ministry of the Interior at the "Casa Baldi" in Olevano Romano near Rome and in 1996 she received a scholarship at the Villa Aurora in Los Angeles.

In 1997, she received her doctorate with a thesis on the work of Lion Feuchtwanger. In 2001 she was a founding member of the International Feuchtwanger Society in Los Angeles. From 2001 she was on the advisory board of the Bertelsmann book sales club until its dissolution at the end of 2002.

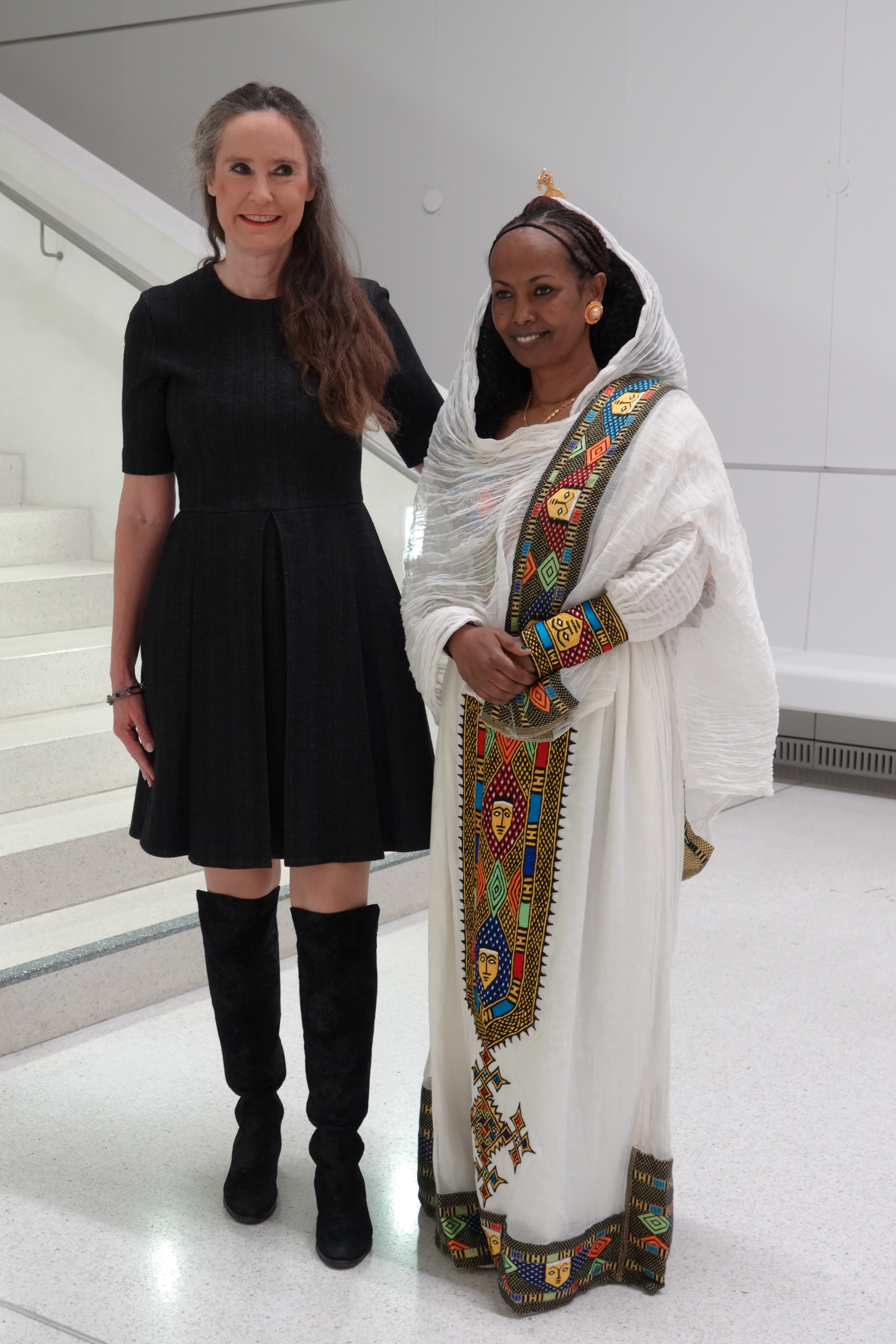
Kinkel with Yirgalem Fisseha Mebrahtu, 2023

Kinkel is a member of the PEN Centre Germany and the Federal Association of Young Authors (BVjA). She has been a member of the Munich Tower Writers since 2004.

In 2006, the Bavarian State Ministry for Education, Culture, Science and Art appointed her to the board of trustees of the International Artists' House Villa Concordia, Bamberg. In the same year, Kinkel was recognized as a creative achiever at the 100 Minds of Tomorrow exhibition.

In 2007, she became patron of the Federal Children's Hospice Association.

At the end of 2002, she took part in a homage to Michael Ende's The Neverending Story. The result of her engagement with Ende's fantasy world was the novel The King of Fools, published in 2003. In 2015, with Sleep of Reason, she dedicated herself for the first time to a topic from the recent past, the German Autumn of 1977.

In 2017, Kinkel was a tower clerk in the small town of Abenberg in Central Franconia, the first woman to hold this position. As a result of her work there, she published the volume of short stories Voices from Abenberg. Also in 2017, the film adaptation of her third novel The Puppeteers was broadcast as a television film in two parts on ARD. In 2020, her first series, The Prison Doctor, designed for listening, was published by the audiobook provider Audible.

Since 2015 she has been a guest lecturer at the University of Zurich; teaching in the module "History and Media: How History Comes to the Media".

Since 2018, she is guest lecturer at the University of Television and Film Munich; teaching assignment "Research".

Since December 2019, she is president of the International Feuchtwanger Society, Los Angeles.

== Works ==
=== Novels ===
- Wahnsinn, der das Herz zerfrißt. Goldmann Verlag München 1990, ISBN 978-3-442-09729-6.
- Die Löwin von Aquitanien. Goldmann Verlag München 1991, ISBN 978-3-442-41158-0.
- Die Puppenspieler. Goldmann Verlag München 1993, ISBN 978-3-442-42955-4.
- Mondlaub. Goldmann Verlag, München 1995, ISBN 978-3-442-42233-3.
- Die Schatten von LaRochelle. Goldmann Verlag München 1996, ISBN 978-3-442-44084-9.
- Die Prinzen und der Drache. cbj Stuttgart 1997, ISBN 978-3-570-26003-6.
- Unter dem Zwillingsstern. Blanvalet Verlag 1998, ISBN 978-3-7645-2559-0.
- Die Söhne der Wölfin. Blanvalet Verlag München 2000, ISBN 978-3-7645-2560-6.
- Der König der Narren. München 2003, ISBN 978-3-401-02462-2.
- Götterdämmerung. Droemer Knaur Frankfurt 2004, ISBN 978-3-426-62816-4.
- Venuswurf. Knaur Taschenbuch München 2006, ISBN 978-3-426-63506-3.
- Säulen der Ewigkeit. Knaur Taschenbuch München 2008, ISBN 978-3-426-51225-8.
- Im Schatten der Königin. Droemer Knaur München 2010, ISBN 978-3-426-19817-9.
- Das Spiel der Nachtigall. Droemer Knaur München 2011, ISBN 978-3-426-19818-6.
- Verführung. Knaur Taschenbuch München 2013, ISBN 978-3-426-51287-6.
- Manduchai, die letzte Kriegerkönigin. Droemer Knaur München 2014, ISBN 978-3-426-30489-1.
- Schlaf der Vernunft. Droemer Knaur München 2015, ISBN 978-3-426-19967-1.
- Grimms Morde. Droemer Knaur München 2017, ISBN 978-3-426-30661-1.
- Die Friedensforscherin. Perry-Rhodan-Storys (E-Book, EPUB), Rastatt 2021, ISBN 978-3-8453-5156-8.

=== Short stories ===
- 2017 Voices from Abenberg

=== Stage plays ===
- 2002 premiere of the flash drama Judgment of God on the cathedral square in Bamberg
- 2007 You should give to the emperor what is the emperor's and Pray for us sinners

=== Audio plays ===
- 2020 The Prison Doctor, Audible audio book series

== Awards ==
- 2000: Culture Prize of the Upper Franconian Economy (IHK for Upper Franconia)
- 2009: St. Michael's Association Social Prize "St. Michael's Coat" for founding the Bread and Books Association.
- 2014: Culture Prize of the Upper Franconian Foundation
- 2015: Golden Homer in the Biography category for Manduchai – The Last Warrior Queen
- 2018: E.-T.-A.-Hoffmann Prize of the City of Bamberg
- 2021: Bavarian Order of Merit

== Literature ==
- Lutz Backes: Tanja Kinkel. In: ders.: Fränkische Köpfe, von Albrecht Dürer bis Markus Söder [Franconian Minds, from Albrecht Dürer to Markus Söder]. PH. C. W. Schmidt, Neustadt a.d. Aisch 2022, ISBN 978-3-87707-256-1, p. 122f.
