= Saeein =

Single by Junoon

from the album Inquilaab and Azadi
- Released: 1997
- Recorded: 1995
- Genre: Sufi rock
- Length: 5:34 (album version); 5:24 (music video)
- Label: EMI Pakistan, Sadaf Stereo
- Songwriters: Sabir Zafar, Salman Ahmad
- Producers: John Alec, Salman Ahmad

Junoon singles chronology
"Ehtesaab" (1996)	"Saeein" (1997)	"Sayonee" (1997)

"Saeein" (Urdu: سائیں, literal English translation: "Oh Lord") is a song by Pakistani sufi rock band Junoon. It is Junoon's eleventh single and the second from the 1996 studio album Inquilaab. The song is written by lead guitarist Salman Ahmad and lyricist Sabir Zafar. Due to the song's popularity, it also featured on the band's fourth studio album Azadi released in 1997. "Saeein" is one of Junoon's most popular songs, and has been covered numerous times, most notably by Indian singer Harshdeep Kaur. The song marked Junoon's foray into what later became the sufi rock sound that the band is most popularly associated with. The song blends rock guitars and bluesy vocals with eastern elements like the use of tablas (traditional south Asian hand drums), raga-inspired melodies, traditional Pakistani folk music, and Eastern-inspired poetry.

"Saeein" was ranked #3 in a list of Junoon's top 10 songs and #9 in the top sufi rock songs list published by Gibson Guitar on their website.

In addition, the short version of the song featured on the band's fourth studio album, Azadi, released in 1997. The song has also featured in several other albums by the band like Kashmakash (1995) and Dewaar: The Best of Junoon (2004).

== Track listing ==
Saeein

All tracks are written by Junoon.

No.	Title	Length
1.	"Saeein"	5:34
2.	"Saeein Alaap"	4:41
3.	"Saeein" (Video)	5:24

== Cover versions ==
- 2008: Harshdeep Kaur (performed live at the singing competition Junoon - Kuch Kar Dikhaane Ka)
- 2011: Usman Riaz (covered an instrumental version of the song on Junoon's 20th anniversary album)

== Personnel ==
Junoon

- Ali Azmat - lead vocals, backing vocals
- Salman Ahmad - backing vocals, lead guitar
- Brian O'Connell - bass guitar, backing vocals

Additional musicians

- Malcolm Goveas - drums
- Ustad Ashiq Ali Mir - tablas and Dholak
