= Tapu Javeri =

Pakistani photographer (born 1965)

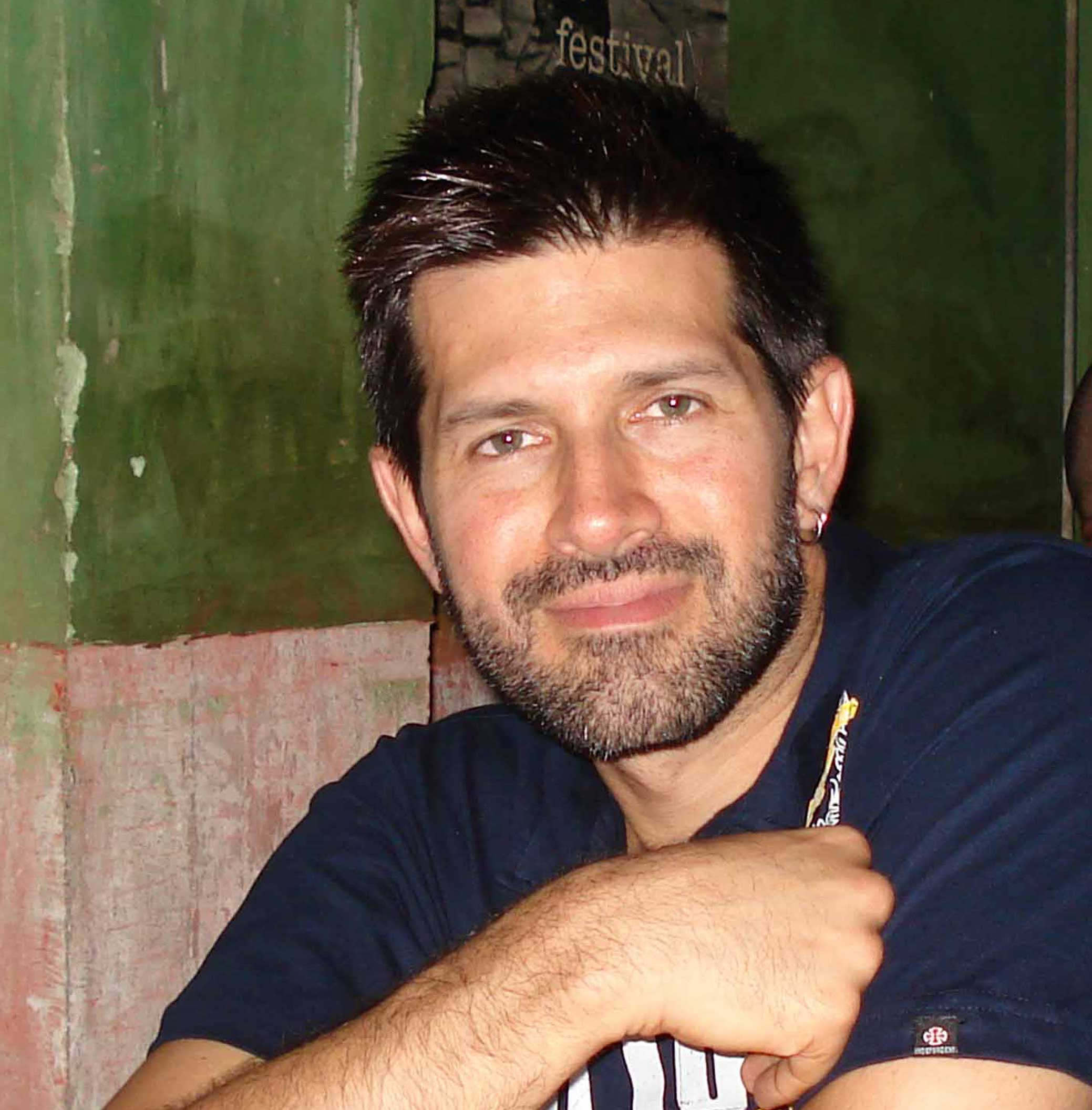
- Born: Mustapha Farabi Javeri; 5 May 1965 (age 61); Karachi, Sindh, Pakistan
- Occupations: Photographer, Radio Jockey, Brand Ambassador, jewellery designer, television Judge
- Years active: 1974–present

Tapu Javeri (Urdu: ٹپو جویری; born Mustapha Farabi Javeri on 5 May 1965) is a Pakistani fashion and art photographer, radio host, television judge and jewellery designer. He works as a freelance photographer and was the photo editor of the Xtra magazine. He designs handbags, T-shirts, and scarves for his label "Tapulicious". He has also designed T-shirts for the Pakistani fashion designer Maheen Khan's label "Gulabo".

He hosts a radio show, The Dark Room on CityFM89 (a country-wide radio channel in Pakistan). In 2010, 2011 and 2012 he was one of the jurors for Lux Style Awards.

== Early life ==
Javeri is the son of jeweler Hassan Ali Mohammad Javeri and Ayesha Javeri. He has four siblings. He went to Karachi Grammar School for his early education and then to Bard College, New York City, to study Anthropology. After that, he went to Athens for his master's degree in Archeology and returned to Pakistan after the internship.

Javeri traces his roots back to Jamnagar, Gujarat, where his ancestors were court jewelers to the Nawabs of Kutch.

== Career ==
Javeri got his first camera at the age of nine, and by the time he was 15, he had been published in the Dawn newspaper. He then worked for magazines like Teenager, Libas, Fashion Collection, Newsline, Gallerie (India), Visage and Herald. He became photo-editor for the Pakistani fashion magazine Xtra in 1994

Javeri has been described as a "pioneer" of photography and painting in Pakistan. He uses photo montage, combining paints and photographs. Predominant colours are blues and browns. He has participated in group shows of paintings and photographs. His first solo show of artworks was held at Indus Gallery in 1997. Art Gallery in Islamabad held a solo show of his paintings. Javeri has exhibited at 50 group shows and 10 solo exhibitions. These include Where three dreams cross at Whitechapel Gallery, London and KaraChakra and KolachiScope in Karachi.

He has developed a T-shirt range known as "Tapu's Tees", and also produced a photo-video montage depicting Karachi with Karachakra and Kolachiscope techniques.

Javeri is the brand ambassador of Nikon cameras, Pond's and Sony Ericsson phones.

Javeri was the judge for the British Council Pakistan's 2012 "Dickens and the City" competition.

Javeri was also one of the judges for Veet Miss Super Model Contest Seasons 2 & 3.

On 11 March 2013 Javeri became an ambassador for World Wide Fund for Nature – Pakistan (WWF-Pakistan)'s Earth Hour 2013 along with Samina Pirzada, Adnan Siddiqui, Faakhir Mehmood, Frieha Altaf, Mekhaal Zulfiqar, Ayesha Omar and Agha Shiraz.

On 11 June 2012 Javeri became the brand council member of Magnum ice cream along with Ayaan, Deepak Perwani, Kiran Aman, Nabila and Madiha Sultan.

His "Tapulicious" line is an evolution of photo-manipulations, taking inspiration from the streets, but creating wearable art. Javeri uses his photographs of Pakistan to create both prints and bags from the images. The "Tapulicious" bags were showcased in Fashion Pakistan Week 3 in April 2012 in Karachi. The handbags collection contains faces of different famous fashion personalities against the muted backdrop of Karachi's landmarks and truck art.

In June 2012 Intel announced the latest range of the laptops a.k.a. Ultrabook and stated that Javeri has launched colourful Ultrabook sleeves which portray the vibrant Pakistani culture.

In March 2013 Javeri designed Peace T-shirts for the event "To Karachi With Love" to raise money for the victims of the Abbas Town blast.

In September 2013, Javeri was amongst Pakistani fashion designers to showcase his collection of Digital Prints and Handbags in the 8th Annual Expo Pakistan 2013 organized by Trade Development Authority of Pakistan (TDAP).

Javeri teaches photography at Indus Valley School of Art and Architecture and Karachi School of Arts.

== Reception ==
Dawn reported for Javeri's exhibition at the Summer Show 2011 Karachi: "A very impressive contribution to the show was that of Tapu Javeri whose five-by-five feet, beautifully put together montage of photo images, collage and colour deserved a wall space of its own." Similarly, Dawn newspaper asserted in 2006 that "All his work has been a runaway success".

Pakistan Art Review stated about Karachakra exhibition: "Karachakra looks like a Karachi Namaa to the viewer; it is like Nazeer Akbarabadi writing a poem on Karachi of the recent times."

Javeri also works as a jewelry designer, which is his family business. Play TV described that sometimes his photography seems to be influenced by his jewelry designing techniques which can be seen in his work in Kolachiscope and Karachakra.

== Books ==
=== Publications by Javeri ===
- I, Voyeur. Karachi, Pakistan: Pakistan Herald Publications (Pvt) Ltd. 2004. p. 227. ISBN 969-8837-02-7.
- Tapulicious. Pakistan: Still Waters Publishing. 2010. p. 116. ISBN 978-969-9251-17-7.
- Tapulicious 2. Karachi: Markings Publishing. 2013. p. 198. ISBN 978-969-9251-34-4. Archived from the original on 13 April 2015.
- Shades of Green. Saatchi & Saatchi. 2008. p. 112.
- Dou Rukh. Markings Publishing. 2011.

=== Publications with contributions by Javeri ===
- 8. Black Olive Publication. February 2015. p. 172. ISBN 978-969-9251-62-7.
- Faruqui, Arshad; Jan, Amean (2010). K' Architecture. Black Olive. p. 147. ISBN 978-969-9251-12-2.
- "Golden Pakistan"
- Where Three Dreams Cross: 150 Years of Photography from India, Pakistan and Bangladesh: 150 Years of Photography from India, Pakistan and Bangladesh. Steidl; Bilingual edition. 5 July 2010. p. 376. ISBN 978-3869301389.

== Awards and nominations ==
- 2002: Nominated, 2002 Best Photographer, Lux Style Awards.
- 2006: Winner, 2006 Best Photographer, Indus Style Awards.
