= Heer (instrumental) =

Single by Junoon

from the album Junoon and Azadi
- Released: 1991 (re-released in 1997)
- Recorded: 1991
- Genre: Sufi rock Alternative rock
- Length: 4:49 (album version); 4:38 (music video)
- Label: EMI Pakistan, Sadaf Stereo
- Songwriter: Salman Ahmad
- Producer: Salman Ahmad

Junoon singles chronology
"Heer" (1991)	"Talaash" (1993)

"Heer" (Urdu: ہیر 'pure') is an instrumental song by the Pakistani sufi rock band Junoon. The instrumental was first released in 1991 on the band's self-titled debut album, Junoon and later in their fourth studio album, Azadi, released in 1997. The instrumental is composed by the band's lead guitarist Salman Ahmad. The instrumental blends rock guitars and bluesy vocals with eastern elements like the use of tablas, raga-inspired melodies and traditional Pakistani folk music.

In concerts, the song has been frequently performed by Junoon as an intro to their song "Heeray". The music video of the instrumental single is based on the famous poem Heer Ranjha by Waris Shah, it is also one of the popular tragic romances of the Punjab. It tells the story of the love of Heer and her lover Ranjha.

In addition, the instrumental song has also featured in the compilation album Kashmakash, released in 1995. "Heer" was named at #4 in a list of Junoon's top 10 songs published by Gibson Guitar on their website.

== Music video ==
The music video of the instrumental single "Heer" by Junoon is based on one of the famous tragic romances of the Punjab, Heer Ranjha. The video starts off with the sun rising and then a clip of a female dancer dancing in traditional sufi manner. Afterwards, Salman Ahmad is seen playing his guitar with a tabla player in several scenes in the music video. In the middle of the video, the story of the love of Heer and her lover Ranjha begins with several scenes showing Salman Ahmad playing his lead guitar and several shots of the female dancer performing traditional sufi dance. Several scenes are shown with Heer and Ranjha secretly meeting each other but Heer's family finds it out and then Heer is shown in grieve, heartbroken. In the end, several men are seen beating Ranjha and Heer could be seen crying and asking them to stop beating Ranjha. The video ends with Heer as she attempts suicide by killing her own self with a knife after seeing her lover Ranjha brutally killed by her own family.

== Track listing ==
Heer

All tracks are written by Junoon.

No.	Title	Length
1.	"Heer"	4:49
2.	"Heer" (Video)	4:38

== Cover versions ==
- 2011: Shahjehan Khan (covered an instrumental version of the song on Junoon's 20th anniversary album)

== Personnel ==
Junoon

- Ali Azmat - lead vocals, backing vocals
- Salman Ahmad - backing vocals, lead guitar
- Brian O'Connell - bass guitar, backing vocals

Additional musicians

- Ustad Ashiq Ali Mir - tablas
