= Seyoum Tsehaye =

Eritrean journalist (born 1952)

Seyoum Tsehaye (Tigrinya: ስዩም ጸሃየ; born 1952) is a jailed Eritrean journalist. At independence in 1993, Tsehaye was named to be the head of Eri-TV, the Eritrean state broadcaster. He was arrested in September 2001 when President Isaias Afewerki closed all non-governmental media sources. In December 2007, Seyoum was named Reporter of the Year by Reporters Without Borders. As of January 2016, he was known to be alive, being held at Eiraeiro prison.

== Journalism ==
In 1977, Seyoum joined the Eritrean People's Liberation Front (EPLF), which was fighting in the Eritrean War of Independence against the Mengistu Haile Mariam dictatorship of Ethiopia, to which Eritrea had been forcefully annexed. After four years training as a guerilla fighter, he started training in photography and started a joint role of fighter and war correspondent. Seyoum reported on the battle of Massawa in 1990, in which the EPLF gained control of the port city Massawa.

In 1991, when the Mengistu dictatorship was overthrown, Seyoum became head of Eri-TV, the Eritrean state television broadcaster. During the initial few years of independence, some independent journalism existed in Eritrea, and Seyoum participated in independent film and journalism, including the newspaper Setit, which criticised the government. Seyoum was refused funding for film equipment when he wished to film the Eritrean–Ethiopian War during 1998–2000, and was not allowed to travel to the war front. Seyoum became critical of the war.

== Imprisonment ==
Seyoum was arrested on 18 or 21 September 2001 along with 10 other media professionals when prominent members of the People's Front for Democracy and Justice (PFDJ) and military called for democracy. Seyoum himself had published his opinion in favour of a transition to democracy.

In 2002, Seyoum, Fessehaye "Joshua" Yohannes and several other Eritrean prisoners started a hunger strike, demanding to appear before a court. In April 2002, Seyoum and the others were transferred to secret prisons in the Eritrean prison system. In 2003, Seyoum was moved to Eiraeiro prison. As of January 2016, he was held in cell No. 10 of block A01. One or two years later, he refused to cooperate with prison guards and was trying to hunger strike, and stated, "I did my duty", "It is my responsibility" and "I don't care if I die here." In 2013, Seyoum's niece, Vanessa Tsehaye, started the One Day Seyoum campaign to free him and other Eritrean political prisoners.
