= Talaash (song) =

Single by Junoon

from the album Talaash
- Released: 1993
- Recorded: 1992
- Genre: Pop rock Alternative rock Hard rock
- Length: 5:12 (album version); 5:06 (music video)
- Label: EMI Pakistan, Sadaf Stereo
- Songwriter: Salman Ahmad
- Producers: Brian O'Connell, Salman Ahmad

Junoon singles chronology
"Heer" (1991)	"Talaash" (1993)	"Meri Awaz Suno" (1995)

"Talaash" (Urdu: تلاش, lit. 'Search') is a song by the Pakistani sufi rock band Junoon. It is the seventh track and the only single released from the band's second album, Talaash (1993), released on EMI Records. Written by guitarist Salman Ahmad, it is the lead single on the album. The song uses blending of rock guitars and bluesy vocals with eastern elements like the use of tablas. It remains one of the band's most popular songs. In addition, the album version of the song featured in the compilation album, Kashmakash, released in 1995.

The song is politically-influenced and became subject to censorship, which led to the eventual ban from all state-run television and radio during the rule of the then Pakistani Prime Minister, Nawaz Sharif.

== Music video ==
The music video is about 5 minutes and 06 seconds long. The video featured all three members, Ali Azmat, Salman Ahmad, and Brian O'Connell. The music video starts off with the band performing the song and focuses on each member of the band at different intervals of time. Coming to the end, the video shows clips of different corrupt things going on in the world and then the video shifts back to the band until the end.

== Track listing ==
Talaash

All tracks are written by Junoon.

No.	Title	Length
1.	"Talaash"	5:12
2.	"Talaash" (Video)	5:06

== Personnel ==
Junoon

- Ali Azmat - lead vocals, backing vocals
- Salman Ahmad - backing vocals, lead guitar
- Brian O'Connell - bass guitar, backing vocals

Additional musicians

- Fuad Abbasi - drums
- Ustad Ashiq Ali Mir - tablas
