= Kashmakash (album) =

Compilation album by Junoon
- Released: 1995
- Recorded: 1993–1994
- Genres: Sufi rock, classical rock, psychedelic rock
- Length: 62:13
- Label: EMI
- Producers: Brian O'Connell, Salman Ahmad

Junoon chronology
Talaash (1993)	Kashmakash (1995)	Inquilaab (1996)

Singles from Kashmakash
- 1. "Ehtesaab" Released: December 1996

Kashmakash (Urdu: کشمکش, lit. 'Dilemma') is the first compilation album and the third album overall of the Pakistani rock band Junoon. It is said to be the first compilation album by a pop band in Pakistan. Junoon was taken to court for the controversy generated by the video for "Ehtesaab", which included footage of a polo pony eating at a posh restaurant. Many thought the image was an indictment of the corrupt Pakistani political elite, and especially of former Prime Minister Benazir Bhutto. The government quickly banned the song and video from state television.

== Track listing ==
All music written & composed by Salman Ahmad and Sabir Zafar.

Kashmakash
No.	Title	Length
1.	"Ehtesaab"	2:32
2.	"Neend Athi Nahin"	4:36
3.	"Heeray"	3:54
4.	"Heer (Instrumental)"	4:49
5.	"Jogia"	4:53
6.	"Khwab"	5:27
7.	"Meri Awaz Suno"	5:32
8.	"Talaash"	5:12
9.	"Mera Mahi"	4:46
10.	"Saeein"	5:34
11.	"Jazba-e-Junoon"	4:25
12.	"Husan Walo"	5:25
13.	"Woh"	5:21

Bonus tracks
No.	Title	Length
12.	"Ehtesaab (Reprise)"	2:24
13.	"National Anthem (Instrumental)"	1:59
14.	"Bheegi Yaadein"	6:20

== Personnel ==
All information is taken from the CD.

Junoon

- Salman Ahmad - vocals, lead guitar
- Ali Azmat - vocals, backing vocals
- Brian O'Connell - bass guitar, backing vocals

Additional musicians

- Female vocals on "Jogia" by Fifi Haroon
- Backing vocals on "Ehtesaab" by Najam Sheraz

Production

- Produced by Brian O'Connell & Salman Ahmad
