= Naizghi Kiflu =

3rd Minister of Information of Eritrea^{1}
- In office 2001–2003
- Preceded by: Beraki Ghebreselassie
- Succeeded by: Ali Abdu Ahmed

Personal details
- Political party: PFDJ
- ^{1}Renamed Ministry of Information from Ministry of Information and Culture.

Naizghi Kiflu (Ge'ez: ናየዝጊ ክፍሉ nāyʾizgī kiflū, Tigrinya "Of the Lord," "His part") was an adviser on Local Government Affairs to President Isaias Afewerki of Eritrea. He was living in London, England due to the dialysis he needs for his kidneys but eventually died of the disease. He came to England in 2005 with the intention of becoming an ambassador. His body was believed to be forbidden to enter Eritrea by President Isaias Afwerki, since he had a personality clash with him.
