= Yaar Bina =

Single by Junoon

from the album Azadi
- Released: September 1997
- Recorded: 1997
- Genre: Sufi rock Hard rock
- Length: 3:47 (album version); 3:44 (music video)
- Label: EMI Pakistan, Sadaf Stereo
- Songwriters: Sabir Zafar, Salman Ahmad
- Producers: John Alec, Salman Ahmad

Junoon singles chronology
"Sayonee" (1997)	"Yaar Bina" (1997)	"Azadi" (1998)

"Yaar Bina" (Urdu: یار بنا, literal English translation: "without a friend") is a song by the Pakistani sufi rock band Junoon, released in April, 1997. It is the fourth track from the band's album fourth album Azadi (1997), released on EMI Records. Written by lead guitarist and founder of the band Salman Ahmad and writer Sabir Zafar, it is one of the lead singles on the album, the other being "Sayonee". The song uses blending of rock guitars and bluesy vocals with eastern elements like the use of tablas, raga-inspired melodies and traditional Pakistani folk music.

The success of "Yaar Bina" and "Sayonee" in 1997 propelled Azadi at the local and international music charts; within three months of the release of Azadi, the album had sold over half a million copies and hit platinum sales status in a record four weeks. The single was a hit in South Asia, topping all music charts in Pakistan, India and Bangladesh. The success of the single led the album being the band's highest selling album in South Asia and Junoon received a platinum certification for hitting platinum sales for their album. Also, the success of the album led the band winning the 'Best International Group' title at the Channel V Music Awards, where they performed along with worldwide icons Sting, The Prodigy and Def Leppard. Azadi was nominated for 'Best International Album', having achieved the prestigious honour of being the highest selling album in Pakistan, Bangladesh and India that year.

Although the song received many critical plaudits, it is one of the most well known and popular tracks by Junoon, also listeners and critics have continued to praise "Yaar Bina" as one of the greatest rock songs of all time in Pakistani music industry.

== Track listing ==
Yaar Bina

All tracks are written by Junoon.

No.	Title	Length
1.	"Yaar Bina"	3:47
2.	"Yaar Bina" (Video)	3:44

== Personnel ==
Junoon

- Salman Ahmad - vocals, lead guitar
- Ali Azmat - vocals, backing vocals
- Brian O'Connell - bass guitar, backing vocals

Additional musicians

- Ustad Aashiq Ali - Tambourin, Tabla
