= Pasquale Borgomeo =

Pasquale Borgomeo (20 March 1933 in Naples – 2 July 2009 in Rome, Italy) was an Italian Jesuit priest and longtime director of the Vatican Radio.

Borgomeo entered the Society of Jesus at the young age of 15 (3 October 1948). After the usual noviciate spiritual training, and the traditional Jesuit formation he is ordained priest on 7 July 1963. He is then sent to Paris where he obtains a doctorate in Patristics at the Sorbonne University, with a thesis on the Pastoral Ecclesiology of Saint Augustin, under the direction of Henri-Irénée Marrou.

Though thus prepared to be a professor of Theology circumstances led Borgomeo to be sent to work on the staff of Vatican Radio (in 1970). His competence and culture, knowledge of languages, communication skills and dynamism made him rise to the position of Director General of the Vatican Radio, where he succeeded Roberto (now Cardinal) Tucci. In all he worked for 35 years at the service of the Radio until 2005 when he was succeeded by father Federico Lombardi. For many years Borgomeo represented Radio Vaticana in the European Broadcasting Union.

He died in Rome, Italy, on 2 July 2009, at the age of 76 after a long illness.
