= Nay Eretra Sämunawi Gazét'a =

Tigrinya-language newspaper published in Eritrea

Nay Eretra Sämunawi Gazét'a ('Eritrean Weekly News') was a Tigrinya-language newspaper published in Eritrea. The newspaper, which was founded in 1942 (during the British Mandate period), was issued by the British Information Services. The newspaper was closed down in 1953, when the Ethiopian imperial government banned all Eritrean publications.
