= Inquilaab (album) =

Studio album by Junoon
- Released: January 1, 1996 (re-released on October 20, 1998)
- Recorded: 1994–1996 Recorded at Aamir Hasan Studios in Karachi, Pakistan
- Studio: Aamir Hasan Studio
- Genres: Sufi rock, classical rock, psychedelic rock
- Length: 59:08
- Labels: EMI, VCI Records
- Producers: Brian O'Connell, Salman Ahmad

Junoon chronology
Kashmakash (1995)	Inquilaab (1996)	Azadi (1997)

Alternative cover
- VCI Records Cover.

Singles from Inquilaab
- 1. "Jazba-e-Junoon" Released: March 1996; 2. "Saeein" Released: 1997

Professional ratings
Review scores
Source	Rating
Allmusic	link

Inquilaab (Urdu: انقلاب, literal English translation: "revolution") is the third studio album and the fourth album overall of the Pakistani rock band Junoon. Although previous albums by Junoon also achieved considerable success, 'Inquilaab' contained the band's first major hit, the patriotic song "Jazba-e-Junoon". The album also contained the hit "Saeein," which marked Junoon's foray into what later became the sufi rock sound that Junoon is most popularly associated with. Other hits from the album were "Mera Mahi" and "Husan Walo".

== Background ==
Inquilaab was the first hit album by the Pakistani rock band Junoon, released in 1996. It was also the album which marked the beginning of a new genre of Pakistani music that Junoon pioneered - sufi rock, which later on became the genre that Junoon is widely known for. The track "Saeein" on the album is Junoon's venture into sufi rock.

The album's only single, "Jazba-e-Junoon" was a huge success all over the country and was the band's first big hit. The single topped the music charts and began Junoon's dominance in the Pakistani music industry.

It was the first album in which Junoon developed a nationwide fan following, blending rock guitars and bluesy vocals with eastern elements like the use of tablas (traditional south Asian hand drums), raga-inspired melodies, traditional Pakistani folk music, and Eastern inspired poetry.

== Track listing ==
All music written & composed by Salman Ahmad and Sabir Zafar. Except for "Dosti" which is written by Kannan Rashid.

Inquilaab
No.	Title	Length
1.	"[Untitled] (Intro)"	0:34
2.	"Mera Mahi"	4:46
3.	"Saeein"	5:34
4.	"Rooh Ki Pyas"	6:31
5.	"Husan Walo"	5:45
6.	"Iltija"	6:25
7.	"Khoeey Ankhein"	4:54
8.	"Chalay Thay Saath"	5:22
9.	"Mein Nay Kabhi"	4:32
10.	"Dosti"	3:51
11.	"Mein Kaun Hoon"	4:23
12.	"National Anthem (Instrumental)"	1:59
13.	"Jazba-e-Junoon"	4:25

== Personnel ==
All information is taken from the CD.

Junoon

- Ali Azmat - vocals
- Salman Ahmad - lead guitar, backing vocals
- Brian O'Connell - bass guitar, backing vocals

Additional musicians

- Drums by Malcolm Goveas
- Tablas and Dholak by Ashiq Ali Mir

Production

- Produced by Salman Ahmad & Brian O'Connell Co-produced on "Saeein" by Rohail Hyatt
- Produced, Recorded & Mixed at Aamir Hasan Studio in Karachi, Pakistan
- Mixing, engineering and sound production by Aamir Hasan
- Additional Mixing by Tahir Gul Hassan
- Assistant Recording engineer by N.Z. Rowdy and Ehtisham-ul-Haq
- "Iltija" and "Mera Mahi" recorded at Sound on Sound Studios and "Saeein" at Pyramid Studios.
- Mastered at Nizar Lalani Studios
- Assisted by Shehzad Hasan & Tabish
- Photography by Arif Mehmood
- Album art concept by Salman Ahmad
