= Club Nation =

Radio show

Club Nation Rádio
- Genre: Trance, Progressive
- Running time: 2 Hours
- Country of origin: Netherlands Croatia
- Home station: Transamérica Internacional
- Starring: Tezija & Keyra and Various Guests
- Created by: Tezija & Keyra
- Original release: February 13, 2009 – Present
- No. of episodes: 847
- Website: Club Nation

Club Nation is a weekly radio show hosted by the Croatian/Dutch DJ duo Tezija & Keyra, that is broadcast worldwide by over 30 radio stations. The show takes the format of a two-hour mix in which they play new trance music, both promotional and commercially released.

Club Nation was first broadcast on 13 February 2009 on the commercial Dutch station Splash FM. The station lost its FM frequency and the Japanese FM station Rede Transamérica Internacional decided to continue broadcasting Club Nation. After this more FM and web stations around the world followed.

The show is supported by worldwide known DJs with a guest mix, DJs like Gareth Emery, Cosmic Gate, TyDi, Ferry Corsten and Judge Jules have already been in the show.

== Broadcasts ==
=== Netherlands ===
AB-Radio 105.8
Radio 350 92.3
Atos RTV 106.1
Tynaarlo Lokaal 105.9
Radio Hengelo 105.8
ExcellentFM 104.9
Boschtion FM 95.2
Radio Polderland 106.0
Zap! FM 107.9
RTW FM 105.8
Radio President 107.9
SluttieFM
New Dance Radio
Aktief FM
CentrumRadio Rotterdam
Network Radio 1
Radio 105
Now! FM

=== Belgium ===
Radio M FM 107.5 / 107.6 / 107.2
Thals FM 105.7
Radio Brouwer FM 106.3
Accent FM
Text Radio

=== Germany ===
Club Lounge Radio (Trance Channel) Germany
Trancefan Germany
MegaBPM Germany
Electronic Clubsounds Germany

=== Other countries ===
Radio Club Nation Brazil
Trance Clubber Radio England
Rede Transamérica International 76.5 Japan
Safari Radio 104.7 FM Greece
TurnON Radio International United States
Radio Napa 106.3 FM Cyprus
Emsradio Poland
Trance Radio CH Switzerland
Rapture Radio England
HALOradio
Radio Dj-Fm Albania
SSRadio Hard and Fast England
Kiss FM Ireland
Tune FM United States
HKGFM Hongkong
Trance Vibrations Romania
Radio Net Colombia
Live Mix Brazil

== Playlists ==
Playlists for every episode can be found at the official Club Nation website.

== Regular features ==
Each broadcast features the Tune of the Week, Classic of the week and the Club Nation guest mix.

=== Tune of the Week ===
The Tune of the Week is selected by Tezija & Keyra and most of the time a not yet released track.

=== Classic of the week ===
The Classic of the week is a track from the past years.

=== Club Nation guest mix ===
The Club Nation guest mix is a 30 minutes guest mix by a known dj from around the world. In some special episodes the guest mix is 1 hour.

=== Club Nation Records ===
In 2010 Tezija & Keyra started their record label Club Nation Records, the artists on this label are worldwide promoted in the radio show.
