= Ali Abdu Ahmed =

Eritrean politician

4th Deputy Minister of Information of Eritrea
- In office 2003–2012
- Preceded by: Naizghi Kiflu

Personal details
- Born: 1963 (age 61–62) Asmara, Ethiopia
- Profession: Former vice-president of National Union of Eritrean Youth and a former Minister of Information.

Ali Abdu Ahmed is a former Eritrean politician who left the government and sought asylum abroad. From 2002 until his defection in November 2012, Ali was the Eritrean Minister of Information.

Ali Abdu Ahmed father (an Eritrean national), brother, and 15-year-old daughter Ciham Ali Abdu, a United States citizen, were subsequently detained and have been held indefinitely. The US government inquired regarding his daughter's well-being while the Eritrean government vehemently rejected her status as a US citizen and has refused to release information regarding her whereabouts or well being. Meanwhile, Ali has applied for asylum in Australia.
