= Azadi (album) =

Studio album by Junoon
- Released: August 14, 1997 (re-released on July 11, 2000 & April 9, 2002)
- Recorded: 1996–1997 Karachi, Pakistan
- Genres: Sufi rock, progressive rock, psychedelic rock
- Length: 65:27
- Label: EMI
- Producers: John Alec, Salman Ahmad

Junoon chronology
Inquilaab (1996)	Azadi (1997)	Dosti (1998)

Singles from Azadi
- 1. "Meri Awaz Suno" Released: 1995; 2. "Sayonee" Released: April 1997; 3. "Yaar Bina" Released: September 1997

Professional ratings
Review scores
Source	Rating
Allmusic	4.5/5 stars
ARTISTdirect	4.5/5 stars
Pakistani Music Channel	3/5 stars

Azadi (Urdu: آزادی, lit. 'Freedom') is the fourth studio album and the fifth overall album of the Pakistani sufi rock band, Junoon. The album was released in 1997 and established the Sufi rock sound that the band pioneered in their previous album, Inquilaab. The album was popular worldwide, bringing fame to Junoon.

Music videos were released for the two singles from the album, "Sayonee" and "Yaar Bina". "Sayonee" is Junoon's biggest hit to date, topping all charts in South Asia and also gaining significant airplay on satellite channels across the Middle East. The album sold 1 million units in India alone.

== Background ==
Azadi was released by Junoon in 1997 and was the band's debut album in India. The album's first single, "Sayonee", became an instant hit in South Asia and the Middle East, shooting to the top of all the Asian charts, and staying at #1 on both Channel V and MTV Asia for over 2 months. Azadi hit platinum sales status in a record of 8 weeks. Zee TV invited Junoon to perform at the star-studded Zee Cine Awards in Mumbai in March 1998, where the group received accolades from the creme de la creme of India's entertainment industry.

In 1998, Junoon won the "Best International Group" title at the Channel V Music Awards, where they performed along with worldwide icons Sting, The Prodigy and Def Leppard. Azadi was nominated for Best International Album, having achieved the prestigious honour of being the highest-selling album in Pakistan and Bangladesh 1998 and 1999. Junoon headlined the BBC Mega Mela in 1998, which was the largest Asian festival outside of the South Asia. The album made the band famous throughout the world.

== Track listing ==
All music written by famous poet Sabir Zafar and composed by Salman Ahmad. Except for "Khudi" which was written by Allama Iqbal.

Azadi
No.	Title	Writer(s)	Length
1.	"Sayonee"		5:05
2.	"Meri Awaz Suno"		5:32
3.	"Khudi"	Allama Iqbal	4:13
4.	"Yaar Bina"		3:47
5.	"Mukh Gae Nay"		5:34
6.	"Heer"		4:49
7.	"Wahda Hoo"		4:54
8.	"Kyun Parishan"		3:56
9.	"Mahiwal"		6:02
10.	"Kisne Suna"		3:58
11.	"Lal Meri Pat"		5:21
12.	"Dil Nahin Lag Raha"		3:56
13.	"Loishay"		3:35
14.	"Saeein Alaap"		4:41
15.	"Saeein"		5:34

== Personnel ==
All information is taken from the CD.

Junoon

- Ali Azmat - vocals
- Salman Ahmad - lead guitar, backing vocals
- Brian O'Connell - bass guitar, backing vocals
- Nusrat Hussain - keyboard, backing vocals

Additional musicians

- Ustad Aashiq Ali: Tambourin, Tabla

Production

- Produced by John Alec & Salman Ahmad
- Engineered & Mixed by John Alec

== Certifications and sales ==
Region	Certification	Certified units/sales
India	Platinum	1,000,000
