= CityFM89 =

Pakistani radio station

City FM 89
- Pakistan
- Broadcast area: Karachi, Lahore, Islamabad, Faisalabad
- Frequency: 89 MHz

Programming
- Language: English

Ownership
- Owner: Dawn Media Group

History
- First air date: July 2, 2004

Links
- Webcast: Listen live
- Website: Official website

CityFM89 is a Pakistani radio station, headquartered in Karachi that broadcasts from Karachi, Lahore, Islamabad and Faisalabad. It was established in July 2004 and is a subsidiary company of the Dawn Media Group. It had an objective to set a trend of radio listenership in Pakistan at a time when tapes and CDs were the usual source of music entertainment in cars, homes and public outlets.

== Shows ==
As of 1 January, 2022, the following shows are aired on the radio station:

- The Breakfast Show with Anoushey Ashraf - 08:00 - 11:00 (Monday to Friday)
- Midday Madness - 12:00 - 15:00 (Monday to Thursday) / 12:00 - 14:00 (Friday)
- 89 Jukebox - 15:00 - 16:00(Monday to Friday)
- Rush Hour with Wes Malik - 17:00 - 20:00 (Monday to Friday except Wednesday) / 17:00 - 19:00 Wednesday)
- Route 89 - 20:00 - 22:00 Monday to Friday except Wednesday) / 09:00 PM - 10:00 PM Wednesday)
- The Darkroom with Tapu Javeri- 19:00 – 21:00 (Wednesday)
- Sufi Hour - 14:00 – 15:00 (Friday)
- BeatCamp - 22:00 – 00:00 (Friday) / 22:00 – 23:00 (Saturday)
- Full Disclosure - Saba – 17:00 – 19:00 (Saturday and Sunday)
- Retro89 - 19:00 – 21:00 (Sunday)
