= Yirgalem Fisseha Mebrahtu =

Eritrean journalist (born 1981)

- ይርጋለም ፍስሃ መብራቱ
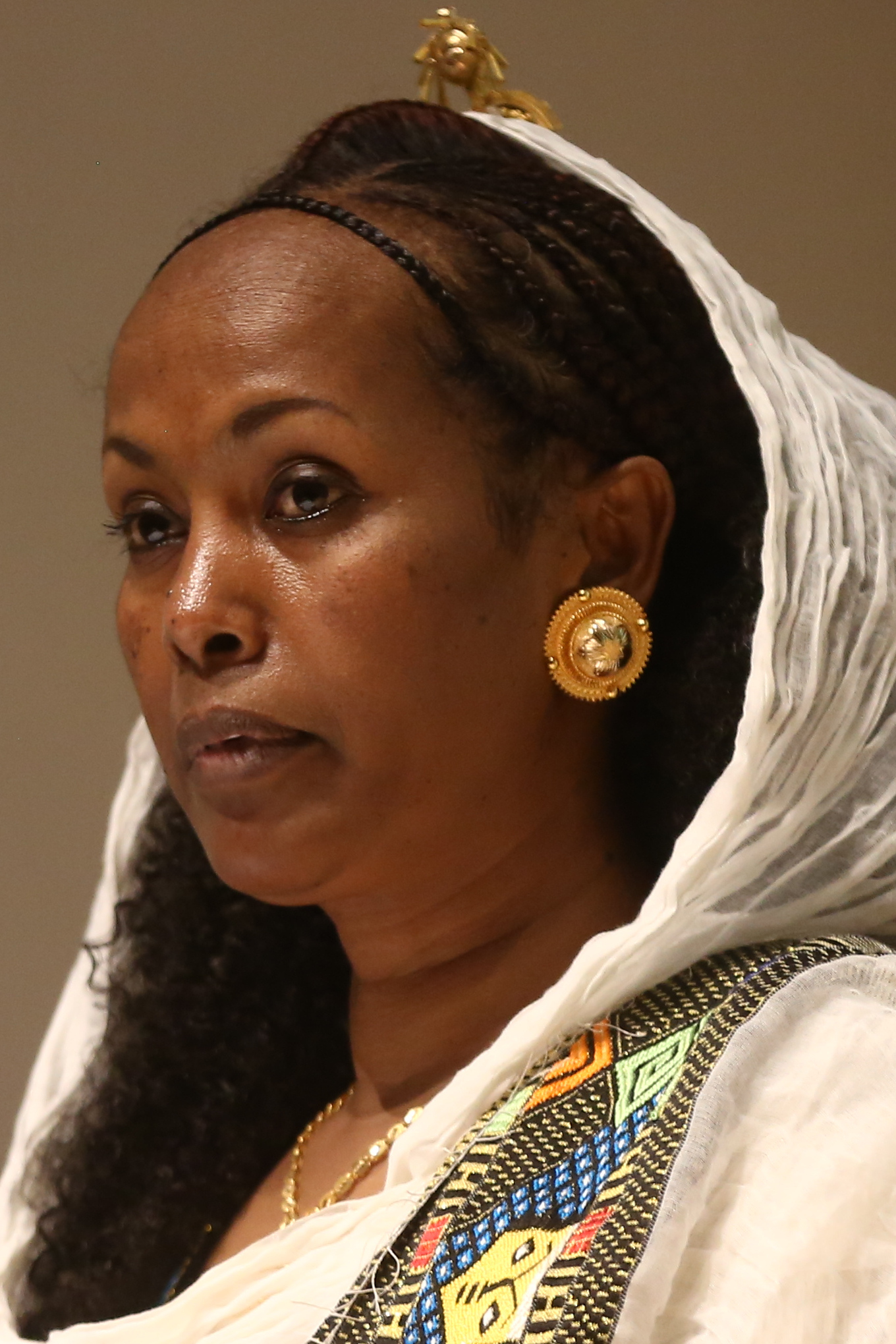
- Mebrahtu in Munich, Germany, 2023
- Born: 1981 (age 44–45); Adi Keyh, Ethiopia
- Occupations: Poet; writer; journalist

Yirgalem Fisseha Mebrahtu (Amharic: ይርጋለም ፍስሃ መብራቱ; born 1981) is an Eritrean poet, writer and journalist. In 2009, she was arrested by the Eritrean government and imprisoned. Since 2018, she has been living in exile in Munich with the support of the PEN Center Germany.

== Early life and career ==
Born in 1981 in Adi Keyh, Yirgalem Fisseha Mebrahtu has written poetry since she was a child. From the mid-1990s, she has taken part in literary events, first at her school and later in private and state media. She founded the Adi Keyh Literature Club with other young writers, which was part of a network of similar groups perceived as reviving Eritrean literature. Until private media was banned in 2001, she worked as an independent journalist and published poems in literary magazines. In 2002 she attended the Teacher Training Institute in the capital Asmara. From September 2003 to February 2009, she was a writer, presenter and program director at the Radio Bana radio station of the Eritrean Ministry of Education. There she produced health news, interviewed doctors and provided information about HIV.

== Imprisonment and exile ==
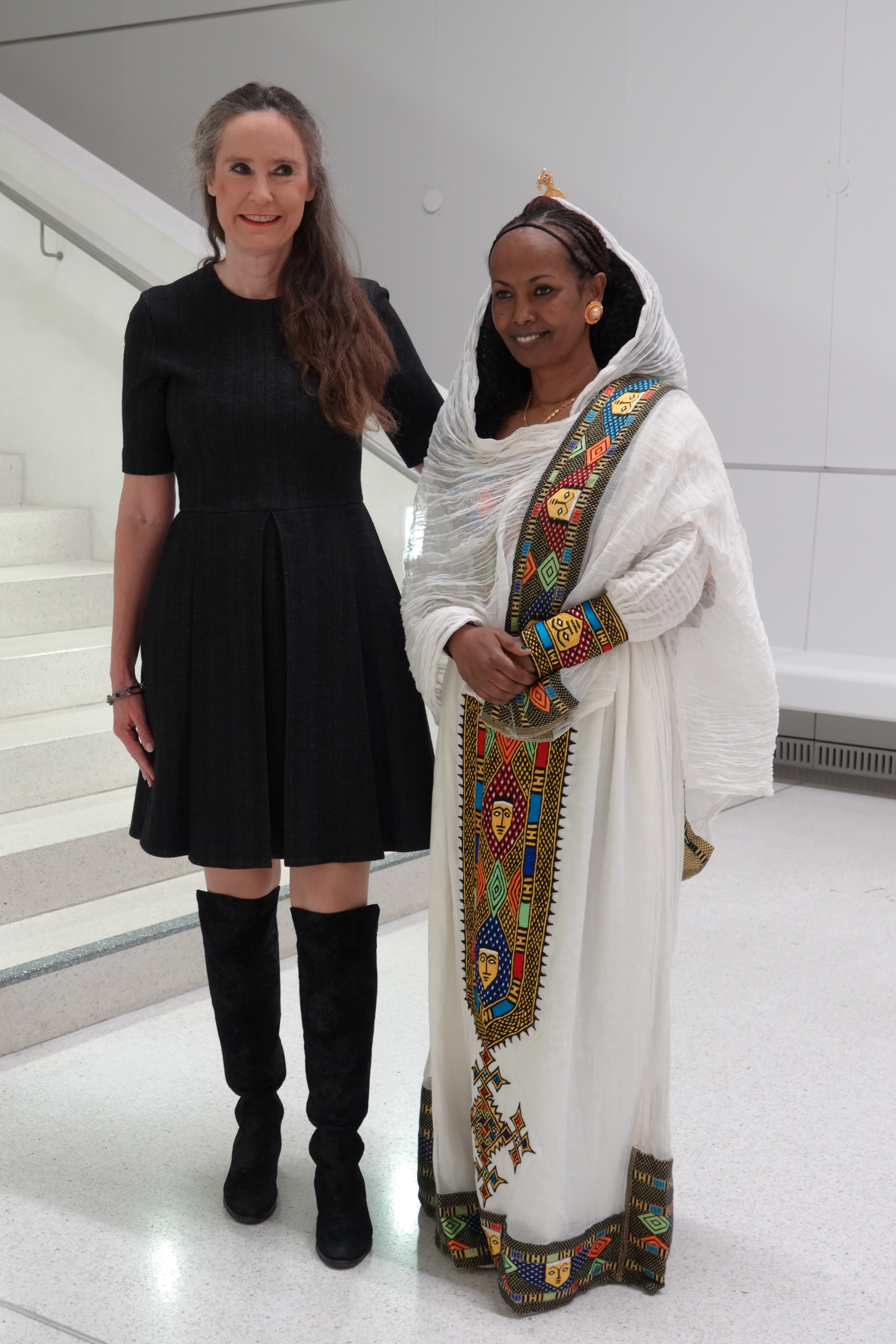
Yirgalem Fisseha Mebrahtu with Tanja Kinkel in 2023

On 9 February 2009, she was arrested with about 30 other people in the radio station building, and she was the only woman among those arrested. She was accused of having ties to foreign media, other charges included allegedly plotting to assassinate the President and belittling politicians. She spent the first two years in solitary confinement in Mai Swra prison, where she was also tortured. After 6 years in prison without charge and without trial, she was released in 2015. Around 2017, she attempted to flee Eritrea but was arrested at the border and imprisoned again for four months. After her release, she managed to escape to Uganda. Other journalists who received similar mistreatment include: Bereket Misghina, Basilios Zemo, and Meles Negusse Kiflu.

The circumstances of her imprisonment received significant international media attention, in the context of a debate on human rights in Eritrea. She was supported by PEN International. In 2014, Reporters Without Borders included her in their first list of 100 Press Freedom Heroes.

In December 2018, she was able to come to Munich as a recipient of the Writers-in-Exile grant from the PEN Center Germany. Her successor in the PEN apartment was Stella Nyanzi.

== Poetry ==
In 2019, she published 130 poems written prior to imprisonment and after her release from exile. They first appeared as ኣለኹ (I'm alive) written in Tigrinya; in 2022 the German translation was published. According to the publisher, the poems fall into two categories: "calm, cowardice and modesty and courage" on the one hand and "the high point of tension, the battlefield of vice and decency, violence and justice, the destruction and continuity of generations" on the other, persecution and death." In 2022, 33 short stories and essays were published in Tigrinya in which she freed herself from her persecution and chose freer subjects.
