= Eritrean Telecommunications Corporation =

Eritrean telecommunication company

EriTel
- Type: State-owned enterprise
- Industry: Communications services
- Founded: 1996
- Headquarters: Asmara, Eritrea
- Products: Local wireline telecommunication services, Digital TV mobile phone operator and ISP
- Website: www.eritel.com.er

The Eritrean Telecommunication Services Corporation (formerly the Telecommunications Service of Eritrea), more commonly known as EriTel, is the sole operator of landline telephone communication infrastructure in Eritrea. It is also the sole operator of the mobile telephone service. However, it is but one of several internet service providers in the country.

== Overview ==
=== EriTel (mobile phone operator) ===
Mobile service by EriTel started in March 2004 and service has grown considerably since inception. EriTel, as of 2013, has nearly 358,000 users, though access to SIM cards are severely restricted, requiring applications to the government. EriTel operates a GSM 900 network which covers almost all major urban areas including: Asmara, Embatkala, Ghinda, Massawa, Dekemhare, Mendefera, Keren, Adi Keyh, Barentu, Teseney, Agordat, Sawa, and Nakfa.

This branch of EriTel was founded jointly between the Government of Eritrea and Ubambo Investment Holdings Limited, a South African firm. EriTel doesn't provide its customers with SMS services to foreign locations.

=== EriTel (ISP) ===
As an internet operator, EriTel was among the first companies to get a license to operate. To provide its product the firm provides internet cafes, leased lines and dial-up connections. However, connections are typically overcrowded and congestion is an acknowledged problem. EriTel controls the national gateway, which it created in partnership with USAID.

=== EriTel (landline operator) ===
EriTel assumed this infrastructure from the Postal and Telecommunications Authority once they were split into separate entities. The infrastructure that is used was laid during the Italian colonial period. It consists primarily of aging copper wire, though in the major urban centers, including Asmara, Massawa, and Keren, upgrades have been made to the switching systems.
