= Radio Erena =

Paris; France
- Broadcast area: France
- Frequency: 11,678 MHz frequency with vertical polarisation (SR 27500, FEC 3/4)

Programming
- Languages: Tigrinya, Arabic
- Format: Info

History
- First air date: 2009

Links
- Website: erena.org

Radio Erena is a Paris-based radio station which broadcasts news in Tigrinya and Arabic into Eritrea. The two-hour daily broadcasts focus on Eritrean politics as well as the migration situation in Europe. The station is headquartered in the 13th arrondissement of Paris, with financial support from Reporters Without Borders. It uses satellite, the internet, and a mobile app to broadcast into Eritrea, where it is the only independent radio station.

== History ==
The station was founded in 2009 by Biniam Simon, a former journalist for Eri-TV who was allowed to travel to Japan in 2007 to take part in a seminar on video production. Fearing repression at home, he sought but was refused asylum in Japan; he then managed to make his way to France. With the help of Reporters Without Borders, he found financial support as well as an office for the station. The station uses satellite, the internet and a mobile app to broadcast in Eritrea, where it is the only independent radio station.

Since 2009, the station has broadcast news on Eritrean politics and the migration situation in Europe in Tigrinya. It broadcasts two hours every day. In 2010, another former journalist from Eritrean Ministry of Information who fled to Ethiopia before seeking asylum in France, Amanuel Ghirmai, has been a co-presenter. Since 2014, the radio also broadcasts a programme in Arabic three times a week, presented by Fathi Osman, a former diplomat.

The station stopped working for three weeks in August 2012. Its satellite dropped the station and its website was hacked. The attack was traced back to an Eritrean location.

The station won the 2017 Special Award from One World Media, a London-based human rights organization.

Due to a lack of funding, the station's staff was reduced from six to three in 2024.
