= Jorge Serguera =

Jorge "Papito" Serguera (c. 1932–2009) was a Rebel Commander and the president of the Cuban Institute of Radio and Television from 1967 to 1974.

At one point Serguera banned songs from The Beatles from airing on Cuban radio stations. At a later point he admitted that he liked listening to the music in private. In a 2001 exclusive interview with Cuban author Ernesto Juan Castellanos, published in the book John Lennon in Havana with a little help from my friends, Serguera said that he was following orders from other officials who viewed the music as a threat to "the Revolution."
