= Eri-TV =

State-owned television network of Eritrea

Eri-TV; ኤሪ-ቲቪ; اري تي.في
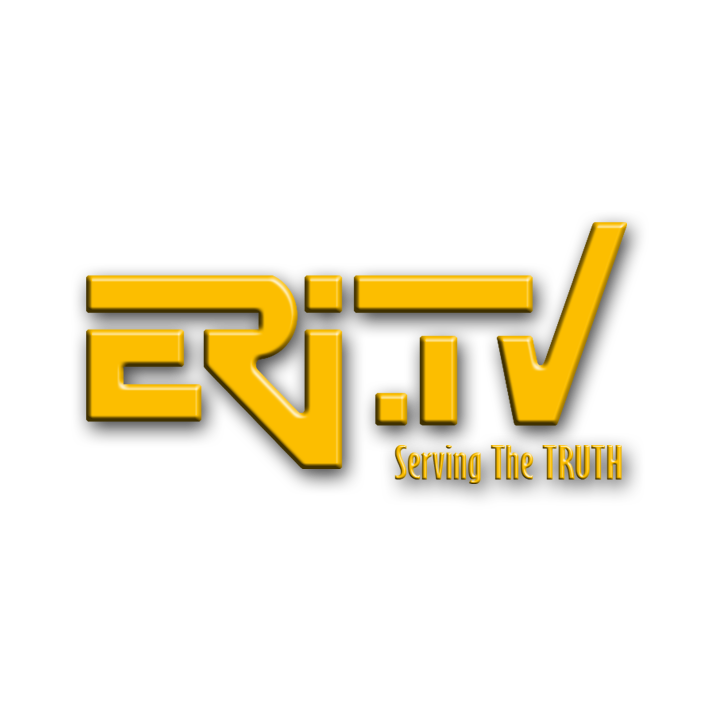
- Country: Eritrea
- Broadcast area: Worldwide
- Headquarters: Asmara, Eritrea

Programming
- Languages: Tigrinya; Arabic; Tigre; English
- Picture format: 4:3 (576i, SDTV)

Ownership
- Owner: Public
- Parent: Denden Media LLC (located at United States)

History
- Launched: January 1993; 33 years ago

Links
- Website: www.eri.tv

Eri-TV, (Note: Tigrinya: ኤሪ-ቲቪ) (Note: Arabic: اري تي.في) acronym for Eritrean Television (Tigrinya: ተለቪዥን ኤርትራ), is the state-owned television network of Eritrea, established in January 1993 two years following its de-facto independence. It is headquartered its capital city Asmara and broadcasts 24 hours a day. Eri-TV offers a diverse range of programming, such as news and current affairs, politics, developments, sports, entertainment, and culture and arts. Eri-TV is also popular among Eritreans living outside the country with an estimated 1–2 million weekly viewers, with the network claiming that it utilizes to communicate with them. The network operates three main television stations.

Eri-TV is the sole domestic television broadcaster in Eritrea by law. The network broadcasts in four languages, namely Tigrinya, Arabic, Tigre, and English. Eri-TV recognizes Eritrean Minority Culture and has largely adopted an equal time share between each of the country's spoken languages. Eri-TV is governed and funded by the Eritrean Ministry of Information.

== History ==
Before the independence of Eritrea, Ethiopia's ETV had planned to build a transmitter in Asmara with a tentative opening date scheduled for December 1976, on VHF channel 5 with an ERP of 1kW. During that time, the United States Armed Forces operated a low-powered station in the city that transmit daily to local viewers. After the referendum that led to its independence, Eri-TV was created in January 1993, with the help of Canadian technicians. The station broadcast with a 1kW transmitter barely covering the capital city. Later in 2003, the station upgraded its transmitter to 5kW and relay stations of Eri-TV were launched in key areas, extending its broadcasts in most parts of the country, although its mountainous terrain prevented it from broadcasting throughout all of Eritrea. Satellite broadcasts and internet streaming started in the same year to cater to the Eritrean diaspora. Eri-TV began digital broadcasting in 2004.

== Channel ==
=== Eri-TV 1 ===
Eri-TV 1 broadcasts internationally via satellite along with its sister radio station, Dimtsi Hafash. Broadcasts on the channel are typically either news, music videos or dramas. It also airs both domestic and international films.

The station broadcasts mostly in Tigrinya, Arabic, Tigre and English. It also airs a few programs in Italian, Amharic and Somali

=== Eri-TV 2 ===
Eri-TV 2 is the second television channel in Eritrea. It broadcasts only for domestic viewers. it provides mostly educational content. This includes English, mathematics and science programs.

=== Eri-TV 3 ===
Eri-TV 3 is the third channel in Eritrea. It broadcasts national and international sports news.

== Leadership ==
Following the Eritrean War of Independence, Seyoum Tsehaye, Eritrean People's Liberation Front (EPLF) member and war journalist became the first head of Eri-TV. He was arrested in 2001 after publishing a statement in favour of democracy.

== See also ==
- Media of Eritrea
