= Public aquarium =

Aquatic counterpart of a zoo

A whale shark at Georgia Aquarium, the largest in the United States

A public aquarium (pl. aquaria; or public water zoo) is the aquatic equivalent of a zoo, which houses living aquatic animal and plant specimens for public viewing. Most public aquariums feature tanks larger than those kept by home aquarists, as well as smaller tanks.

Since the first public aquariums were built in the mid-19th century, they have become popular and their numbers have increased. Most modern accredited aquariums stress conservation issues and educating the public.

== History ==
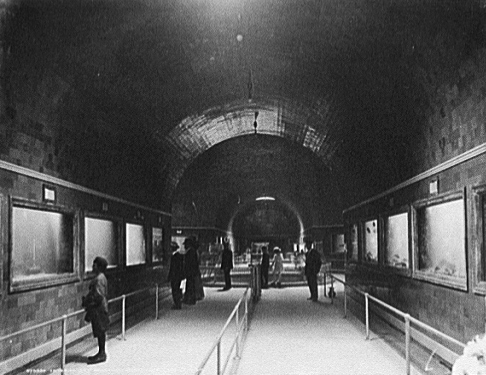
Various Water Zoos at the Belle Isle Water Zoo in Detroit, Michigan c. 1900

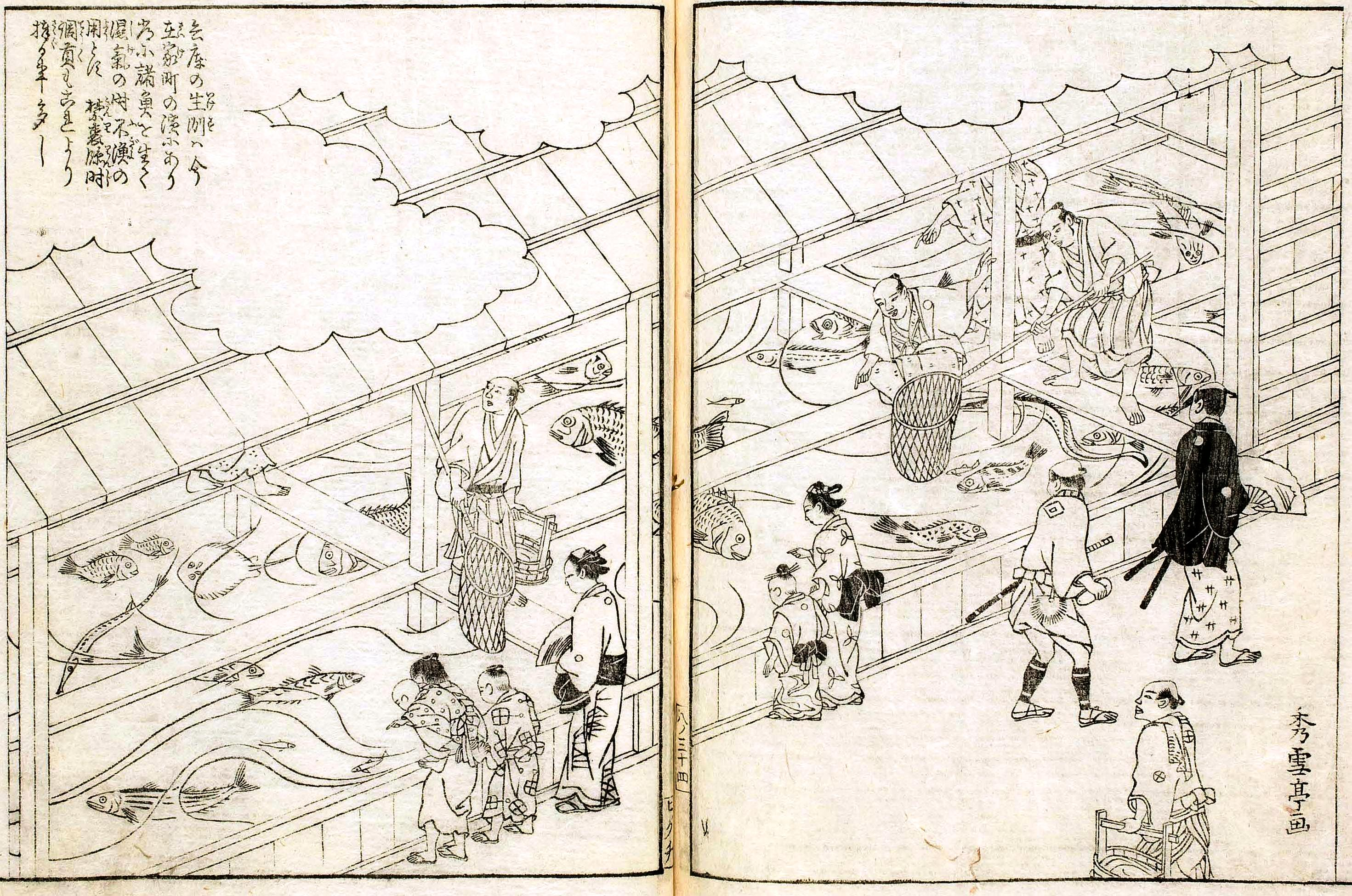
An early aquarium in Japan in the 18th century

The first public aquarium was opened in London Zoo in May 1853; the Fish House, as it came to be known, was constructed much like a greenhouse. P.T. Barnum quickly followed in 1856 with the first American aquarium as part of his established Barnum's American Museum, which was located on Broadway in New York City before it burned down. In 1859, the Aquarial Gardens were founded in Boston. A number of aquariums then opened in Europe, such as the Jardin d'Acclimatation in Paris and the Viennese Aquarium Salon (both founded 1860), the Marine Aquarium Temple as part of the Zoological Garden of Hamburg in Hamburg (1864), as well as aquariums in Berlin (1869) and Brighton (1872).

The old Berlin Aquarium opened in 1869. The building site was to be Unter den Linden (along a major avenue), in the centre of town, not at the Berlin Zoo. The aquarium's first director, Alfred Brehm, former director of the Hamburg Zoo from 1863 to 1866, served until 1874. With its emphasis on education, the public aquarium was designed like a grotto, part of it made of natural rock. The Geologische Grotte depicted "the strata of the earth's crust". The grotto also featured birds and pools for seals. The Aquarium Unter den Linden was a three-story building. Machinery and water tanks were on the ground floor, and aquarium basins for the fish on the first floor. Because of Brehm's special interest in birds, a huge aviary, with cages for mammals placed around it, was located on the second floor. The facility closed in 1910.

The Artis aquarium at Amsterdam Zoo was constructed inside a Victorian building in 1882, and was renovated in 1997. At the end of the 19th century the Artis aquarium was considered state-of-the-art, as it was again at the end of the 20th century.

Before its closing on 30 September 2013, the oldest American aquarium was the National Aquarium in Washington, D.C., founded in 1873. This was followed by the opening of other public aquariums: San Francisco (Woodward's Gardens, 1873–1890), Woods Hole (Woods Hole Science Aquarium, 1885), New York City (New York Aquarium, 1896–present), San Diego (Scripps, 1903), Honolulu (Waikiki Aquarium, 1904–present), Detroit (Belle Isle Aquarium, 1904–2005, 2012–Present), Philadelphia (Philadelphia Aquarium, 1911–1962), San Francisco (Steinhart Aquarium, 1923), Chicago (Shedd Aquarium, 1929). For many years, the Shedd Aquarium was the largest in the United States until the Georgia Aquarium in Atlanta opened in 2005. Entertainment and aquatic circus exhibits were combined as themes in Philadelphia's Aquarama Aquarium Theater of the Sea (1962–1969) and Camden's re-invented Adventure Aquarium 2005, formerly the New Jersey State Aquarium (1992).

The first Japanese public aquarium, a small freshwater aquarium called "Uonozoki" (now Tokyo Sea Life Park), was opened at the Ueno Zoo in 1882.

== Public aquariums today ==
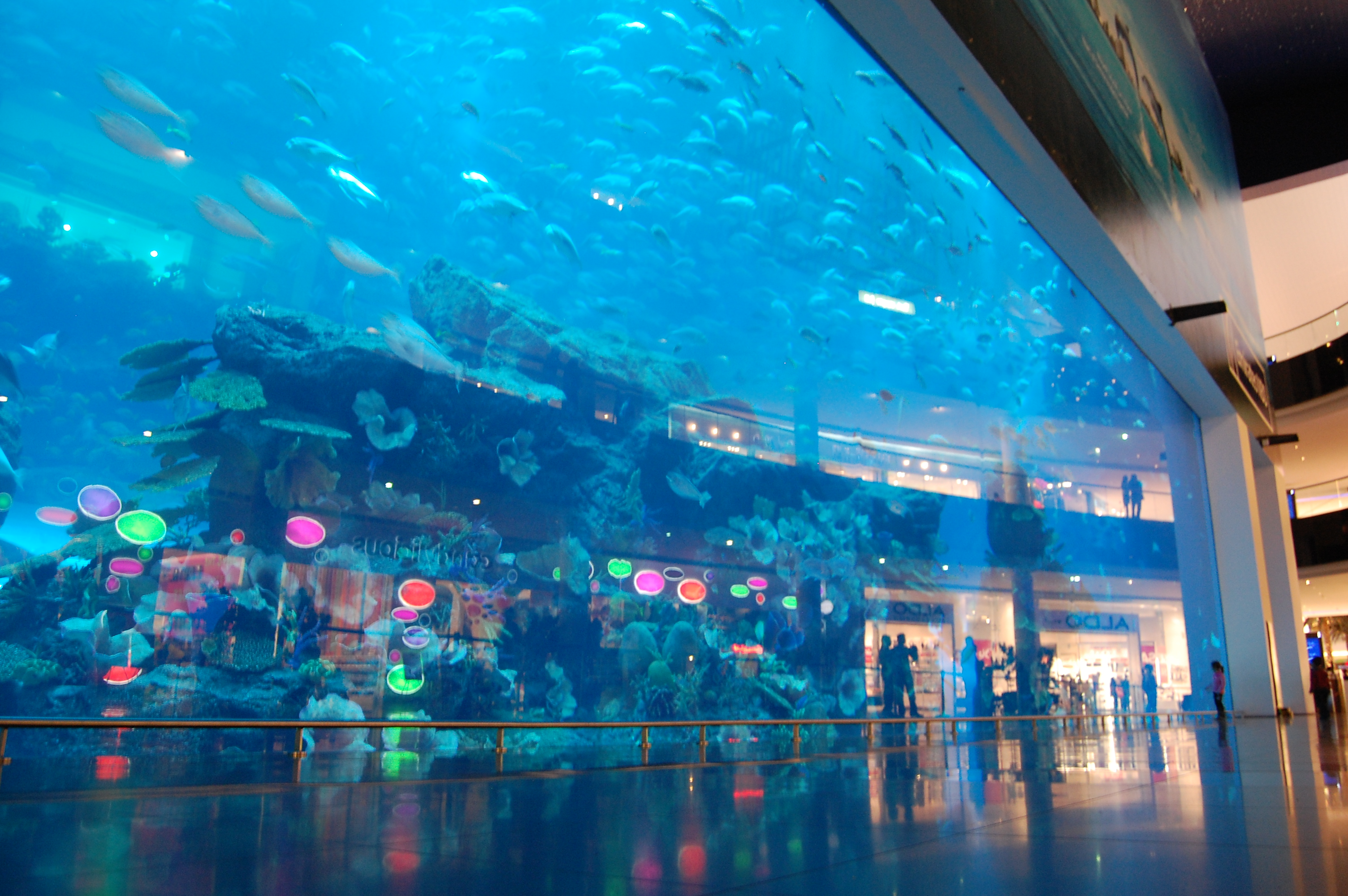
The Dubai Aquarium and Underwater Zoo at the Dubai Mall

Modern aquarium tanks can hold millions of litres of water and can house large species, including dolphins, sharks or beluga whales. This is accomplished through thick, clear acrylic glass windows. Aquatic and semiaquatic mammals, including otters and seals are often cared for at aquariums. Some establishments, such as the Oregon Coast Aquarium or the Florida Aquarium, have aquatic aviaries. Modern aquariums also include land animals and plants that spend time in or near the water.

For marketing purposes, many aquariums promote special exhibits, in addition to their permanent collections. Some have aquatic versions of a petting zoo. The National Aquarium in Baltimore, Maryland houses several exhibits including the Upland Tropical Rain Forest and a multiple-story Atlantic Coral Reef. The Monterey Bay Aquarium has a shallow tank filled with common types of rays which visitors are encouraged to touch. The South Carolina Aquarium lets visitors feed the rays in their Saltmarsh Aviary exhibit.

The largest public aquarium is the Chimelong Ocean Kingdom theme park, opened in 2014 in Hengqin, Zhuhai, with a total of 48.75 million litres (12.87 million US gal) of water. The second largest is the Marine Life Park in southern Singapore with a total of 45 million litres (12 million US gal) of water for more than 100,000 marine animals of over 800 species.

== Logistics ==
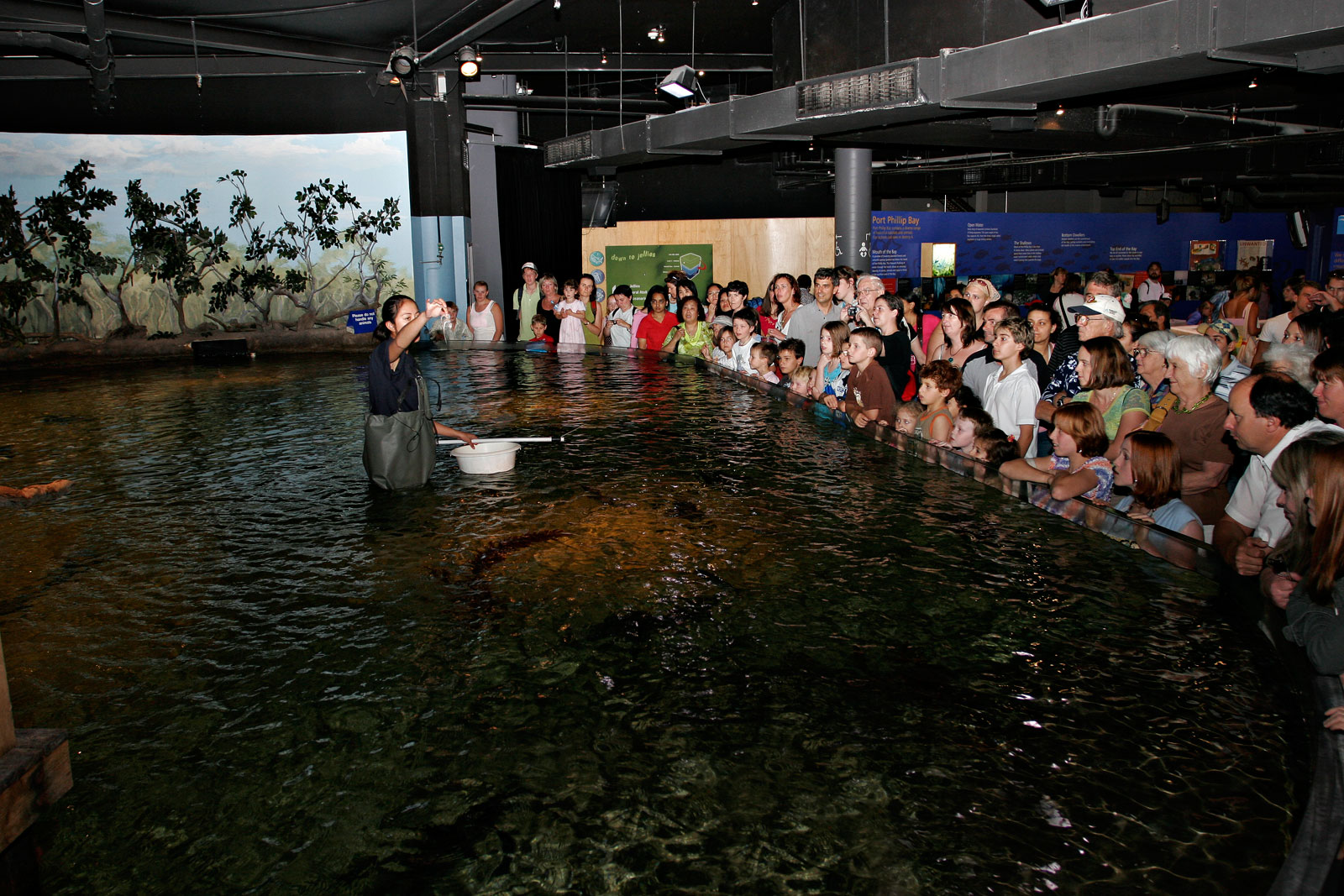
Feeding time at Sea Life Melbourne Aquarium draws a large crowd.

Most public aquariums are located close to the ocean, for a steady supply of natural seawater. An inland pioneer was Chicago's Shedd Aquarium that received seawater shipped by rail in special tank cars. The early (1911) Philadelphia Aquarium, built in the city's disused water works, had to switch to treated city water when the nearby river became too contaminated. Similarly, the recently opened Georgia Aquarium filled its tanks with fresh water from the city water system and salinated its saltwater exhibits using the same commercial salt and mineral additives available to home aquarists. The South Carolina Aquarium pulls the salt water for their exhibits right out of the Charleston harbour.

In January 1985, Kelly Tarlton began construction of the first aquarium to include a large transparent acrylic tunnel, Kelly Tarlton's Underwater World in Auckland, New Zealand. Construction took 10 months and cost NZ$3 million. The 110-metre (360 ft) tunnel was built from one-tonne (2,200-lb) slabs of German sheet plastic that were shaped locally in an oven. A moving walkway now transports visitors through, and groups of school children occasionally hold sleepovers there beneath the swimming sharks and rays.

According to Samantha Muka, creating new public aquariums is an expensive process, that can become so expensive as to render the project economically unsustainable, due to the logistical demands of creating environments in which aquatic animals can survive.

== Activities ==
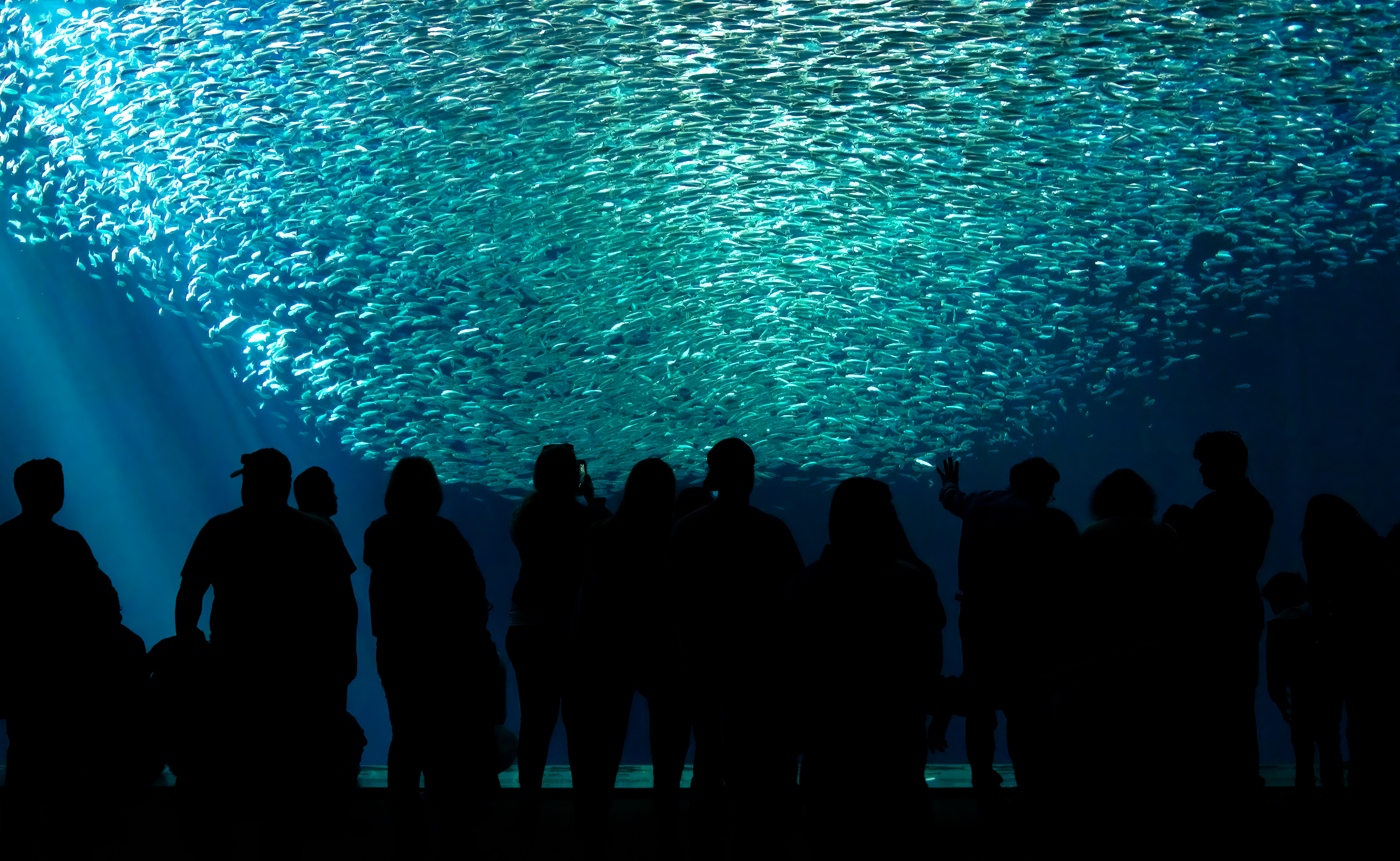
The Open Ocean exhibit at the Monterey Bay Aquarium

Public aquariums are often affiliated with oceanographic research institutions or conduct their research programs, and sometimes specialise in species and ecosystems that can be found in local waters. For example, the Vancouver Aquarium in Vancouver, British Columbia, is a centre for marine research, conservation, and marine animal rehabilitation, particularly for the ecosystem of the Pacific Northwest. In 1964, the Vancouver Aquarium became the second aquarium to capture an orca, Moby Doll. He survived in captivity for just under three months, and the aquarium put him on display to the public for a day, but gave greater emphasis to groundbreaking scientific research. The aquarium also captured other orcas, belugas, narwhals and dolphins. The Monterey Bay Aquarium was the first public aquarium to display a great white shark. Beginning in September 2004, the Outer Bay exhibit (now the Open Sea galleries) was the home to the first in a series of great white sharks. The shark was at the aquarium for 198 days (the previous record was 16 days). The shark was released on 31 March 2005. The Adventure Aquarium in New Jersey has hippos. The Aquarium du Québec houses polar bears.

== Gallery ==
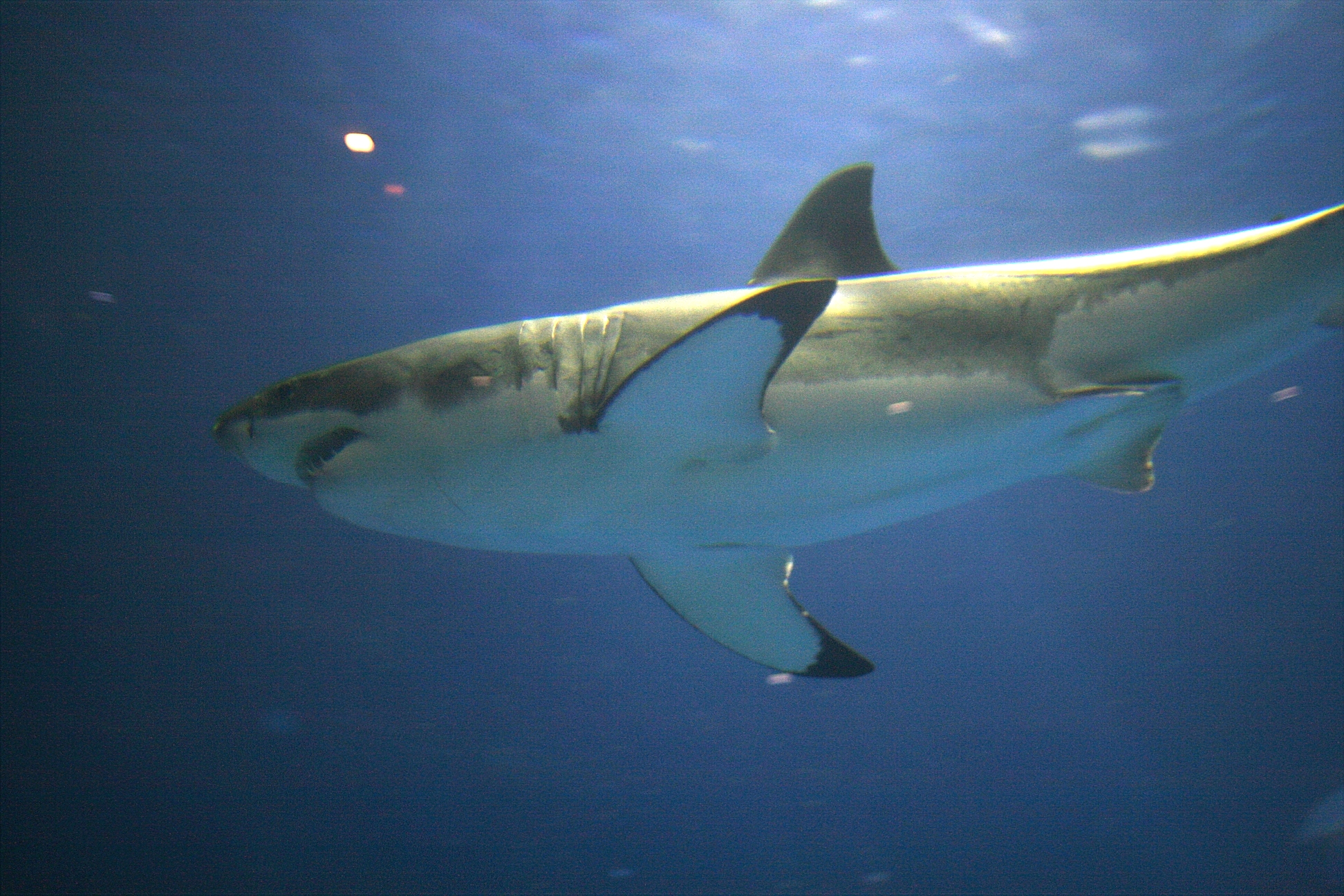
A great white shark in temporary captivity at the Monterey Bay Aquarium, Monterey, USA.

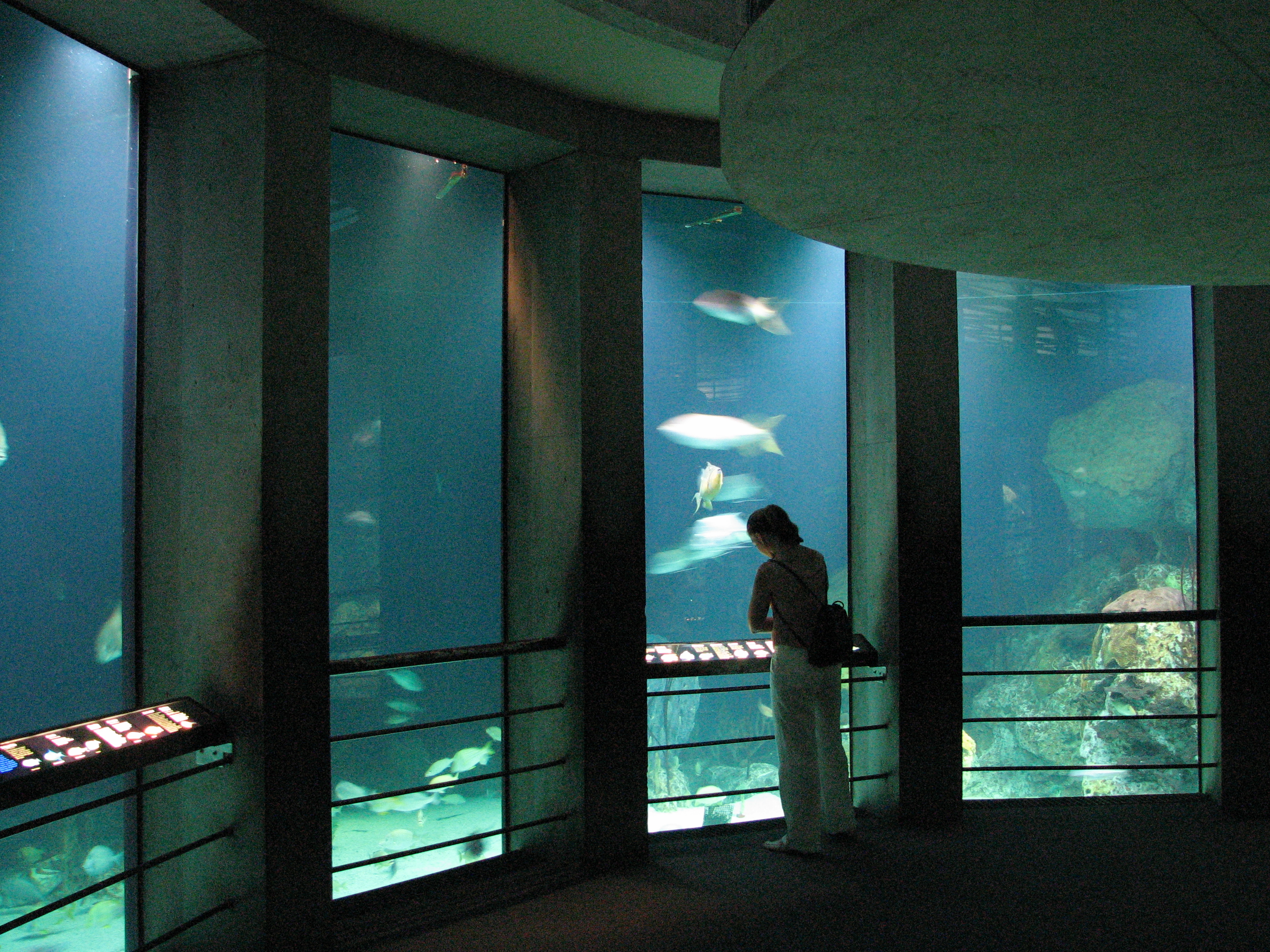
National Aquarium, Baltimore, USA

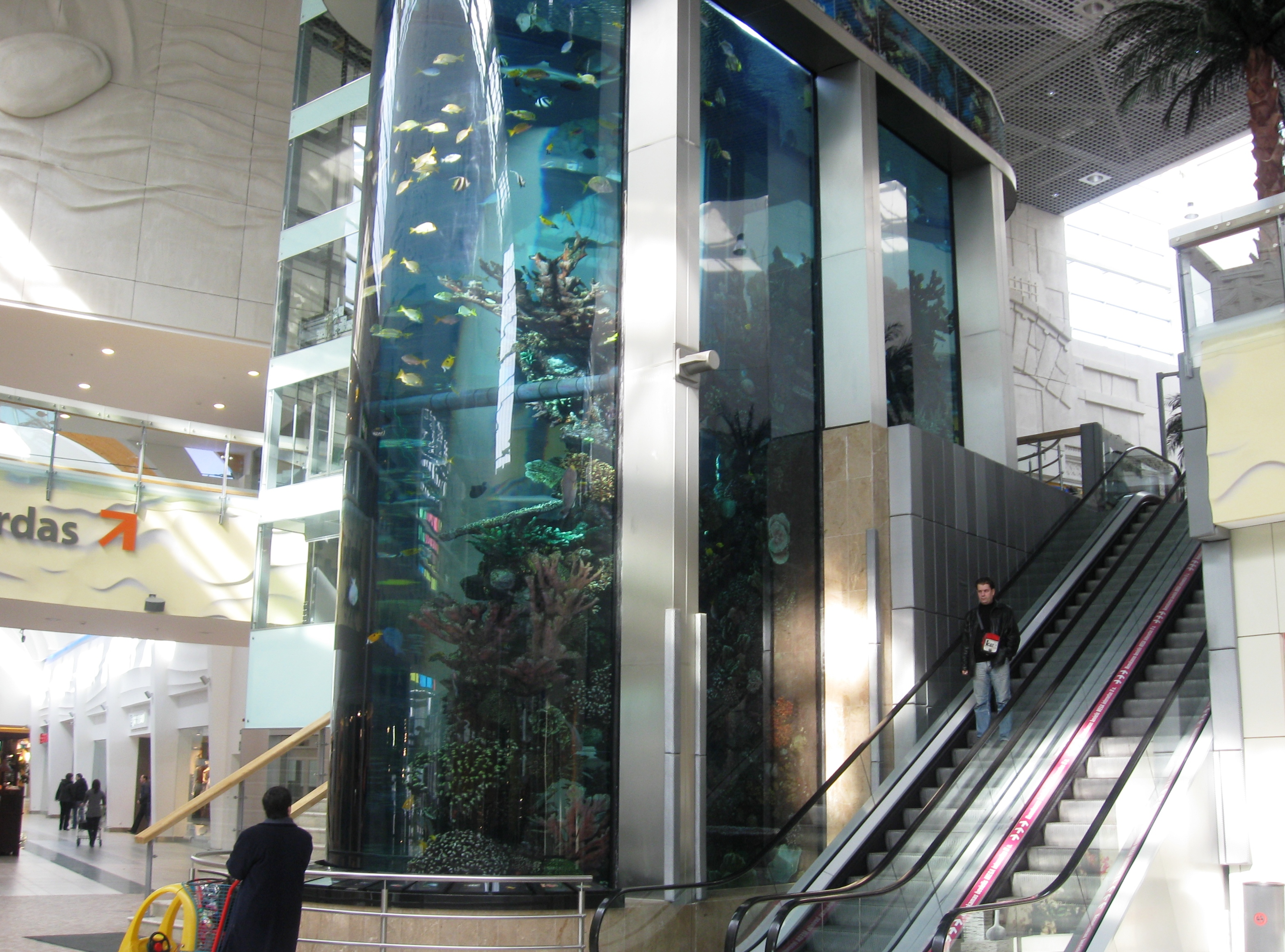
Aquarium at a shopping mall in Kaunas, Lithuania

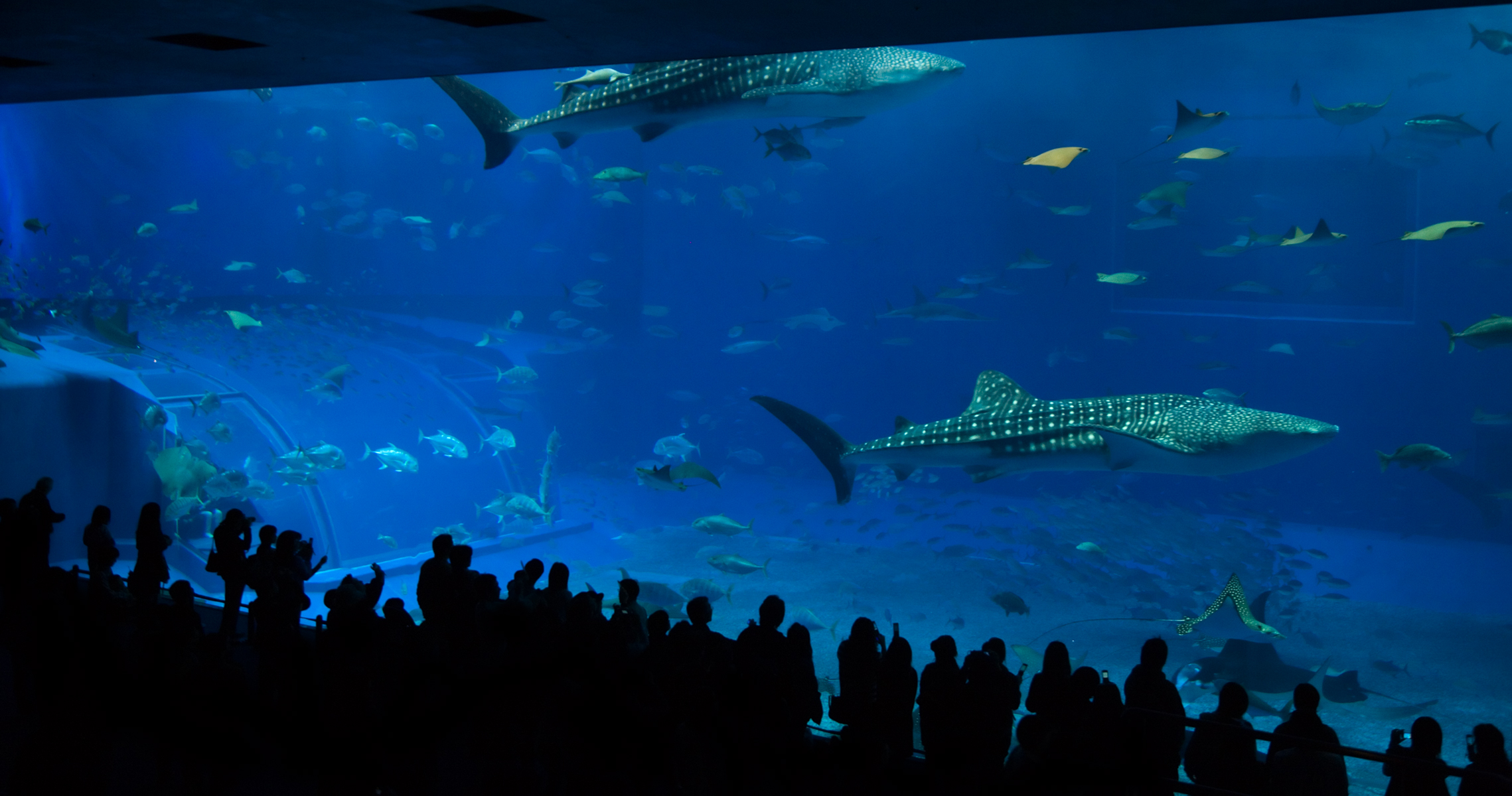
Okinawa Churaumi Aquarium in Okinawa, Japan

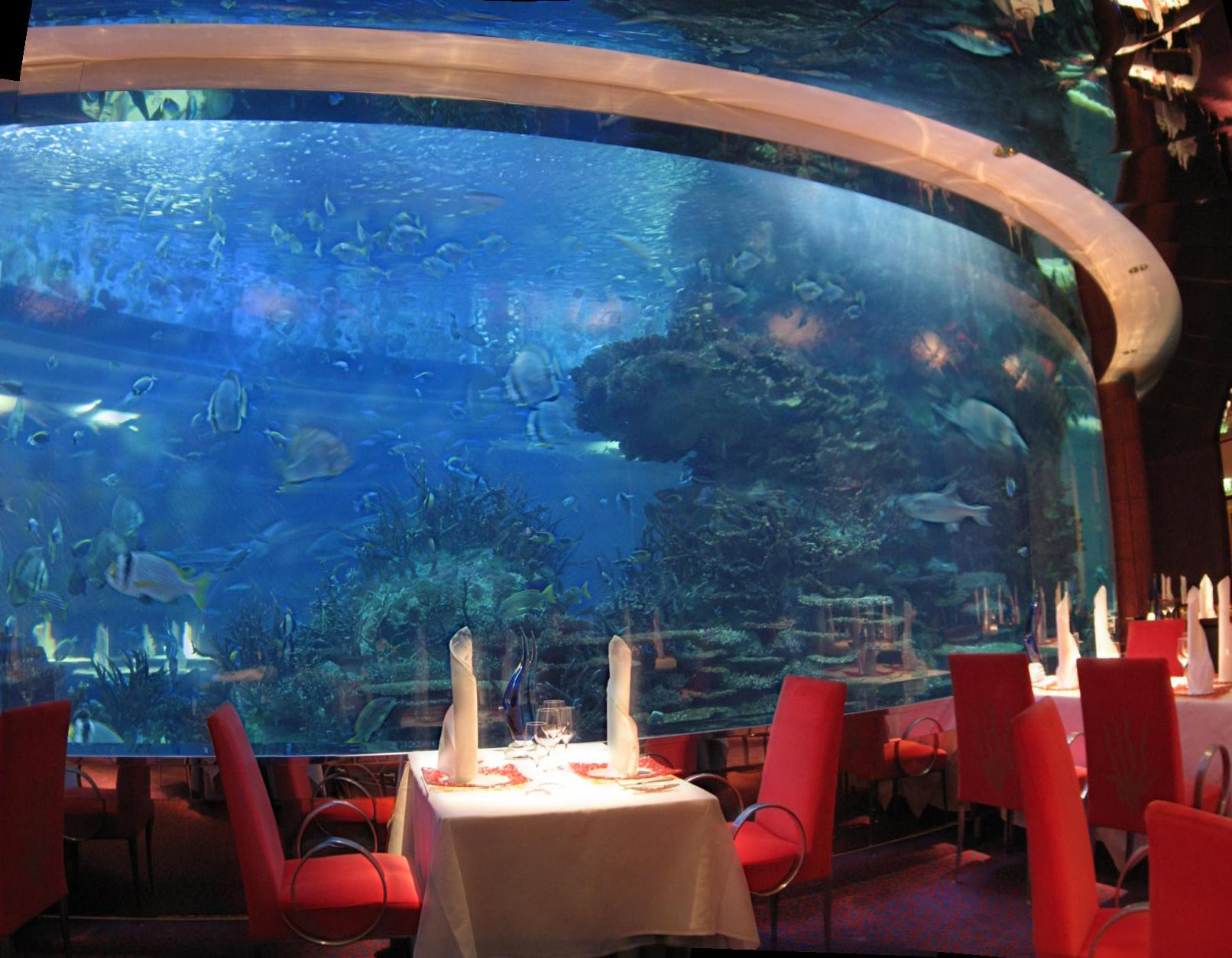
Al Mahara restaurant at Burj Al Arab in Dubai, United Arab Emirates

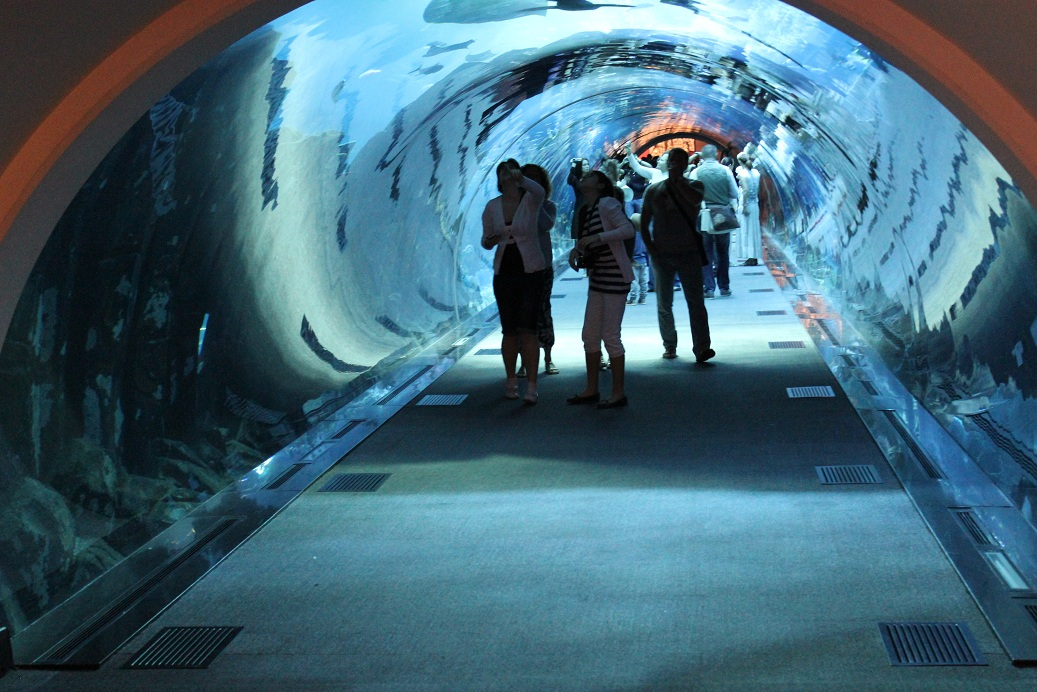
Dubai Aquarium, Dubai, UAE

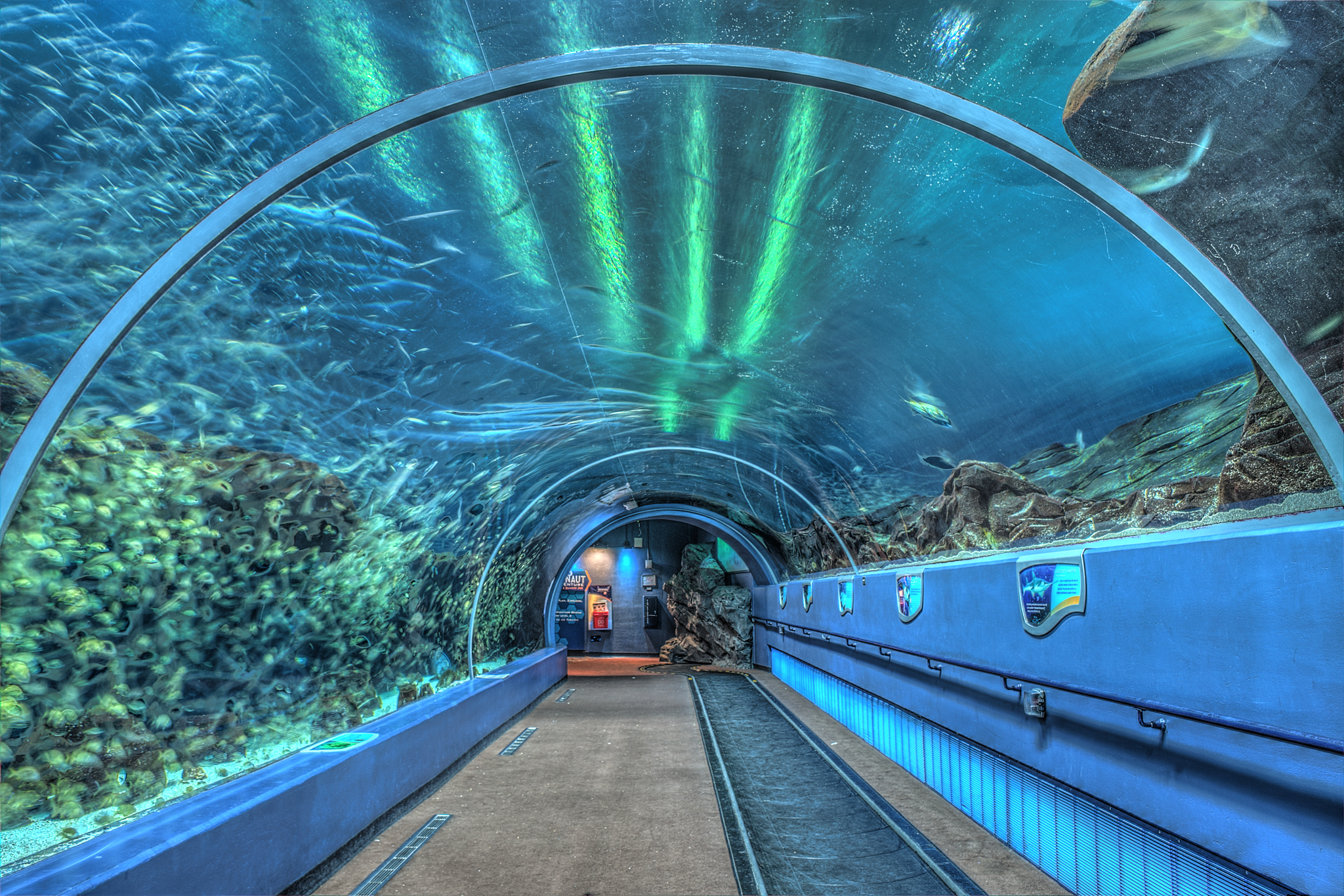
Exhibit tunnel at Georgia Aquarium, Atlanta, USA

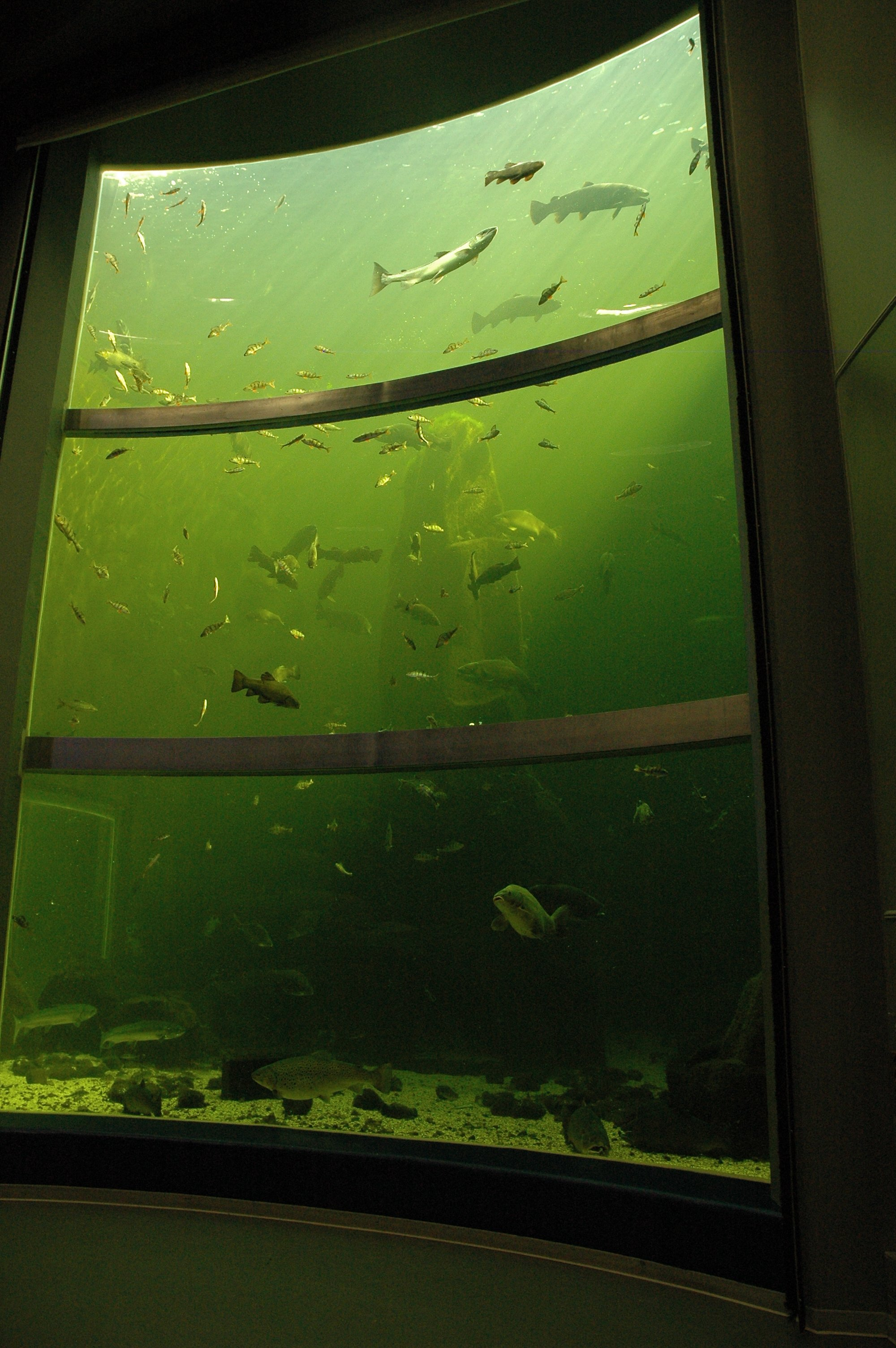
The Baltic Sea Aquarium at the Maretarium in Kotka, Finland

== See also ==
- List of aquaria by country
- Oceanarium
- Zoo
- Freshwater aquarium
