= George A. Hamid =

George A. Hamid may refer to:

- George A. Hamid Sr. (1896–1971), entrepreneur in the American outdoor amusement and entertainment industry
- George A. Hamid Jr. (1918–2013), his son, entrepreneur in the American outdoor amusement and entertainment industry
