= Grover Simcox =

Grover Simcox (1867–1966) was an American illustrator, naturalist and polymath in Philadelphia, Pennsylvania.

== Early life and education ==
Simcox was born in Allentown, Pennsylvania in 1867. He initially worked in several unremarkable jobs in various fields. In 1901, however, he relocated to Philadelphia to study the sciences at the University of Pennsylvania. While his coursework was generally poorly received, his accompanying illustrations were widely praised.

== Career ==
Simcox was in demand as an illustrator for the rest of his career. He completed several notable portraits, including illustrations of plants and animals in his native Pennsylvania. His portraits of plants were mostly completed on the grounds of Fairmount Park, one of the nation's largest and most recognizable public parks.

Several of his illustrations of aquatic life were featured in exhibits and lectures at the Philadelphia Aquarium, one of the nation's first public aquariums.
