= Philadelphia Aquarium =

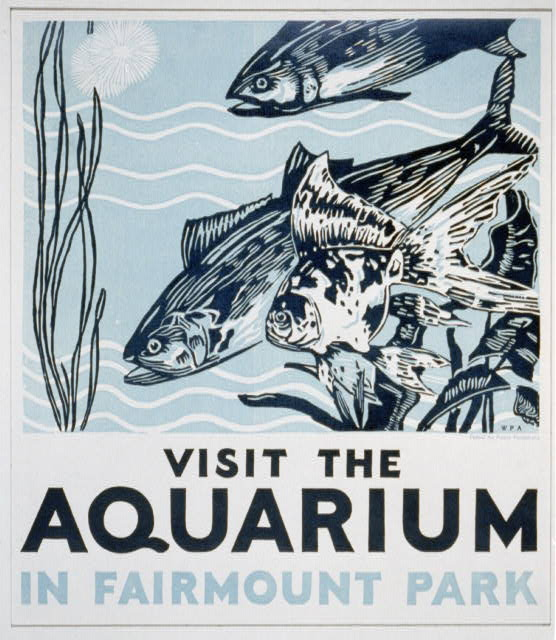
- WPA poster, 1937
- Interactive map of Philadelphia Aquarium
- 39.9663408°N 75.1835954°W
- Date opened: November 23, 1911
- Date closed: 1962
- Location: Philadelphia, Pennsylvania, U.S.

The Philadelphia Aquarium was one of the first aquariums in the United States. It was located on the east bank of the Schuylkill River in Philadelphia’s decommissioned Fairmount Water Works buildings from 1911 to 1962, as part of Fairmount Park.

== History ==
By 1909, Philadelphia’s Fairmount Water Works had been replaced by a series of filtration plants in other parts of the city. The site’s former reservoir land was later used for the Philadelphia Museum of Art.

On May 16, 1911, the mayor of Philadelphia signed an ordinance specifying that an aquarium be created at the old Fairmount Water Works site. About $1,500 was provided initially to create a temporary aquarium in a building that would eventually become a lecture hall, with plans to use the two powerhouses for the permanent aquarium. The aquarium was intended to help educate visitors about the habitat, breeding, and activities of fish, especially those native to Pennsylvania. This was a novel concept at the time, originating in exhibits of fisheries at the 1893 (Chicago) and 1904 (St. Louis) World’s Fairs.

=== Opening ===
The aquarium opened on Thanksgiving Day, 1911, with nineteen small tanks and a series of regular lectures on marine life (many featuring sketches by renowned artist "Biggie" Grover Simcox). Initially, the forebay housed seals and sea lions. When the animals became ill, though, the area was filled in. The waterworks' turbine and pumps were initially used to get water from the Schuylkill River for the exhibits, but this untreated water proved to be too polluted for the fish, and the aquarium switched to using city water.

All of the machinery was removed from the two powerhouses in 1912, and they were eventually refitted as the exhibit halls for the aquarium, the larger (200-by-50-foot (61 by 15 m)) being used for freshwater fish and the smaller (100-by-50-foot (30 by 15 m)) for seawater fish. The buildings required very little structural change, and the flat roofs, previously used as plazas, provided space for skylights to illuminate the exhibits. The aquarium hosted 290,000 visitors in its first year, and by 1929 was one of the four largest aquariums in the world.

=== Closure ===
In the period after World War II, the aquarium suffered from years of inadequate funding, political maneuvering and the resulting neglect. By 1962, the aquarium was forced to close, despite several grass roots attempts to save it. The facility was later used as an indoor swimming pool (closed in 1973). More recent uses have included banquets, guided tours, and a restaurant.

== See also ==
- Aquarama Aquarium Theater of the Sea 1962–1969
- Adventure Aquarium 1992–Present
- Fairmount Park
