= Aquafair =

Theme park and tourist attraction

Aquafair was an animal theme park and tourist attraction in, what was at the time, unincorporated Miami-Dade County, near what used to be Ojus, Florida, that ran from 1956 to 1961.

== Owner ==
A man named George A. Hamid bought an eight acre tourist attraction named Tropical Panorama located at 18495 Biscayne Boulevard in 1956 and added a water stadium. He opened the park known as Aquafair on December 22, 1956. Sam Caponey was the manager at some point during the park's history. Hamid designed Aquafair to be a "Steel Pier like winter attraction" similar to the one that he had bought in 1945. In both tourist attractions, Hamid presented a popular horse diving act.

The diving horse act popularized by Hamid as seen in Steel Pier.

== Notable attractions ==
When visitors first entered the park, a baby chimp named Jay J. was there to greet them. Aquafair featured "Russ Dodson and his Diving Collegians" and Hamid's own signature diving horse act, in which a horse ridden by a young woman dives from a 40-foot concrete platform into a 12-foot tank of water. Also presented were trained porpoises, alligator wrestling, displays of flamingos, monkeys, macaws, and sea cows, and a "lion-killing baboon who dances".

== Bargains and deals ==
In an attempt to bring in more visitors, Aquafair offered reduced admission prices several times. Every visitor under 15 years old had free admission on Saturday, January 27, 1957, a little after the park first opened. When business was declining in the latter 1950s, everyone 12 and under had free admission with their parents entering for half price on Saturday and Sunday, January 31 and February 1, 1959. The reduced rates succeeded in bringing in more visitors, including prominent local groups.

== Notable visitors ==
Members of Jim Dooley's Fishing Club got free admission with their parents paying half price on Saturday and Sunday, July 12 and 13, 1957.

The Crippled Children's Society had about 100 of their kids between the ages of 5 and 14 and their parents visited Aquafair on Wednesday, July 16, 1958.

== Change in ownership ==
After being unsuccessful after its first two seasons, Aquafair was leased by Clyde Beatty, a famous animal trainer and circus performer, in 1960. He renovated the park to be more circus-themed and reopened the place under the name Clyde Beatty's Jungleland—a name similar to one of his other, successful attractions, Jungle Zoo—the same year. However, the park sold out after one year.

Aquafair officially closed in 1961. Jungleland continued on until at least the mid-1960's using Clyde Beatty's name until early 1963 and as Tommy Dale's Jungleland in 1965 and 1966.
