= George A. Hamid Jr. =

American businessman

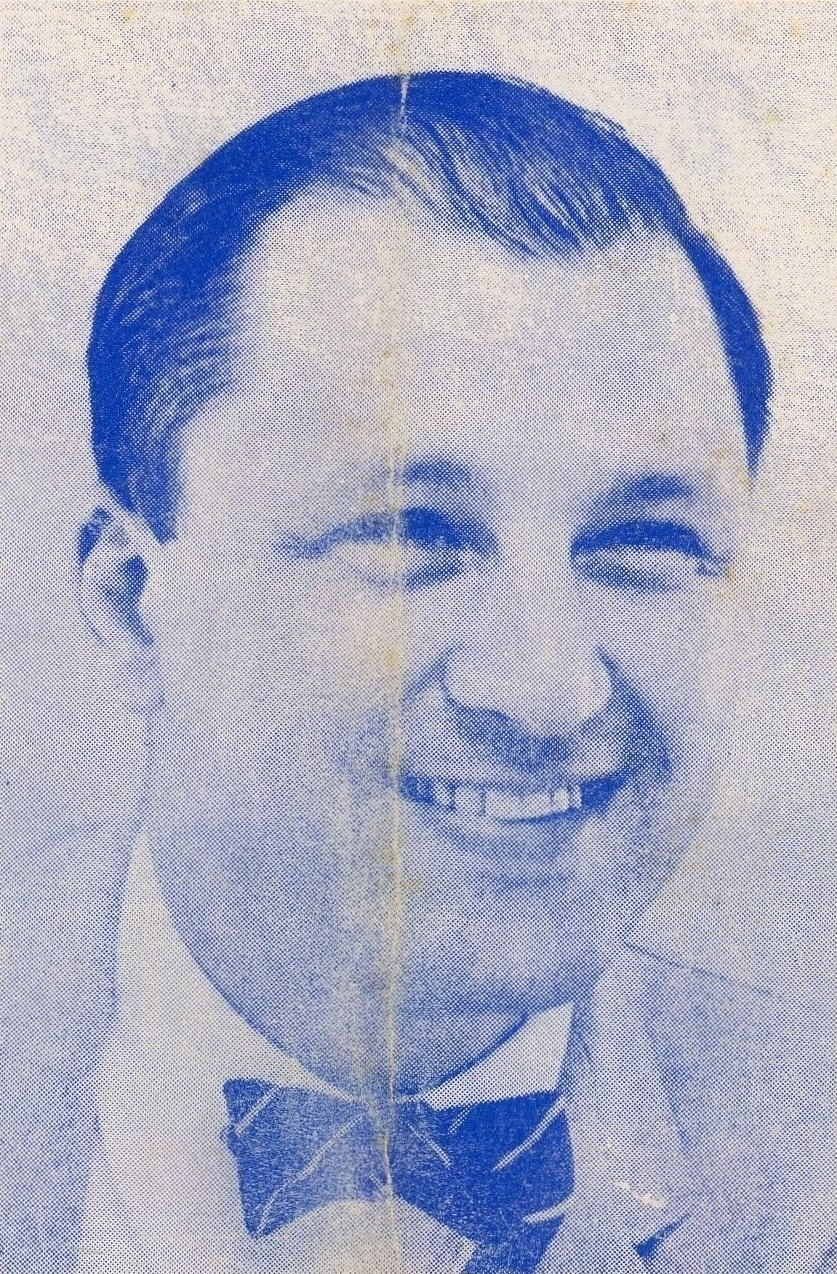
Hamid Jr., circa 1957

George A. Hamid Jr. (November 25, 1918 – February 23, 2013) was an entrepreneur who made major contributions to America's outdoor amusement and entertainment industry. He established significant productions during the 20th century for fairs, circuses, carnivals and expositions. His father was George A. Hamid Sr. After graduating from Princeton University in 1940 and serving in World War II, he built a portfolio of piers and eight Boardwalk theaters in Atlantic City from 1946 to 1975, including Steel Pier and the Million Dollar Pier, and was known as 'king of the Boardwalk'. He sold the properties in 1975 to run the New Jersey State Fair, which he ran until 1996. Hamid also operated the Trenton Speedway in Hamilton which operated for nearly 80 years, a majority of the time with his father owning it before handing it off to Hamid Jr, The track closed in 1980. Hamid Jr. was always proud of the auto racing that was staged at the New Jersey State Fairgrounds and at Trenton. After that, the family concentrated on their original entertainment genre with the Hamid Royale circus.
