= South Carolina Aquarium =

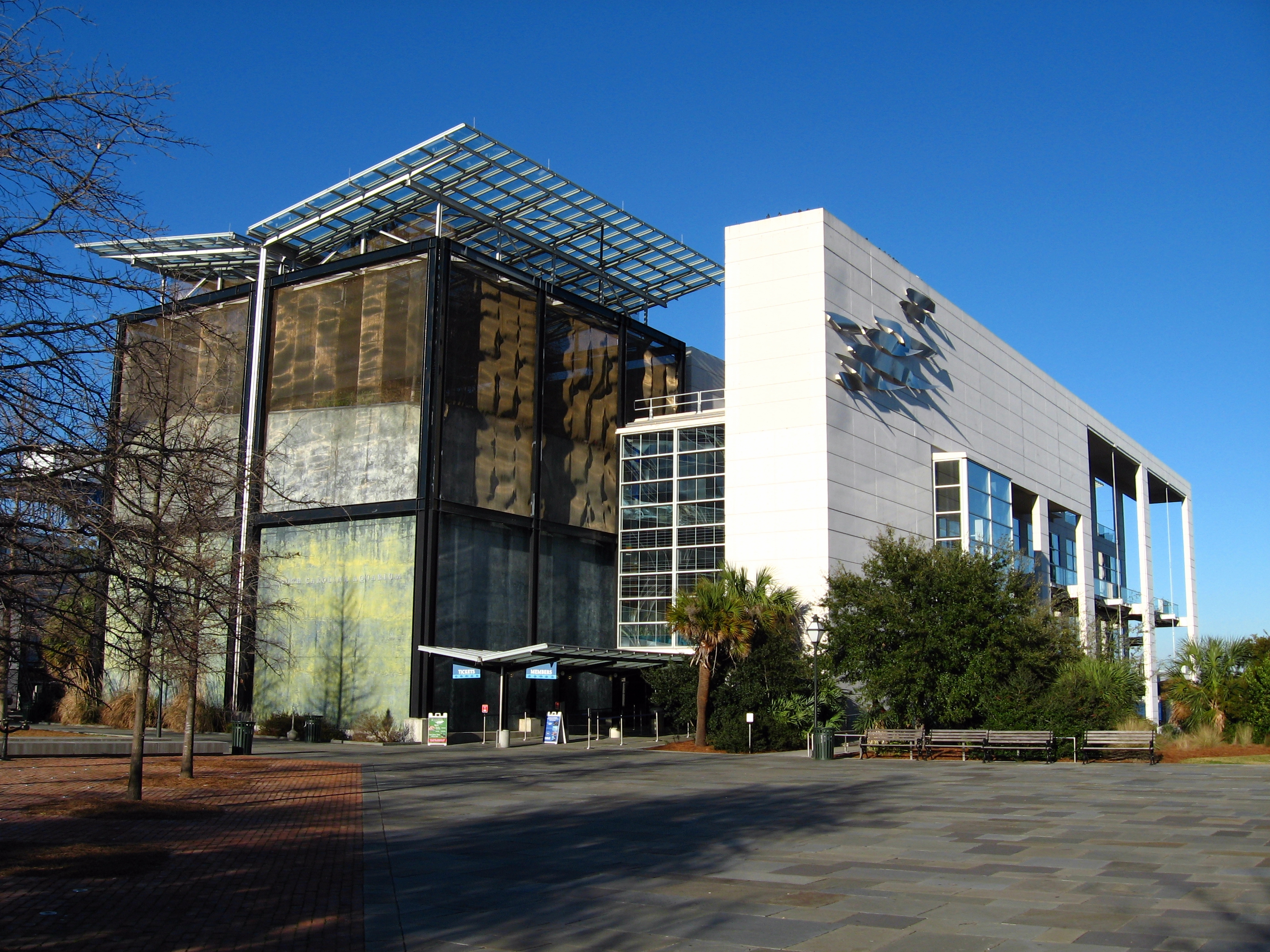
- Interactive map of South Carolina Aquarium
- 32°47′28″N 79°55′32″W
- Date opened: May 19, 2000
- Location: Charleston, South Carolina, USA
- Floor space: 93,000 sq ft (8,600 m^{2})
- No. of animals: 10,000+
- Volume of largest tank: 385,000 US gallons (1,460,000 L; 321,000 imp gal)
- Memberships: AZA
- Website: www.scaquarium.org

The South Carolina Aquarium, is an aquarium in downtown Charleston, South Carolina which opened on May 19, 2000. Located on the historic Charleston Harbor, visitors can enjoy views of the waterfront, including the USS Yorktown and Ravenel Bridge. The Aquarium is a 501(c)(3) nonprofit organization and is accredited by the Association of Zoos and Aquariums (AZA). More than 5,000 animals reside in dozens of exhibits spanning two stories. The largest exhibit, the Great Ocean Tank, holds 385,000 US gallons (1,460,000 L) and stands at 42 feet deep, making it the deepest tank in North America. Additional experiences include multiple touch tanks, a sea turtle hospital and three open-air exhibits. Visitors can see various native South Carolina species including a bald eagle, river otters, alligators, cownose rays, sea turtles, sand tiger sharks, roseate spoonbills, jellyfish and more.

== Exhibits ==
The Aquarium features exhibits showcasing the biodiversity and various regions of South Carolina from the mountains to the sea. Galleries in the 93,000-square-foot (8,600 m2) campus include: Mountain Forest, Piedmont, Coastal Plain, Kids Coast, Saltmarsh Aviary, Coast and Ocean.

In addition to the dozens of exhibits within the galleries, the Aquarium has many interactives for visitors to enjoy. In May 2015, the Aquarium opened The Shallows, a 20-000 open-air touch experience, bringing the community fingers-to-fins with animals like cownose rays and southern stingrays. Visitors can purchase a voucher to hand-feed the rays. In May 2017, sea turtle hospital operations officially expanded onto the first floor of the Aquarium, enabling visitors to come face-to-face with patients, watch procedures and learn ways to save sea turtles through their daily actions. In May 2025, the Aquarium opened the Boneyard Beach Touch Tank Experience, doubling the size of the former touch tank and increasing accessibility with lowered tank walls and windows. Here, visitors may gently touch sea stars, sea urchins, Atlantic stingrays, horseshoe crabs, chain dogfish and more.

== Sea Turtle Care Center ==
The South Carolina Aquarium Sea Turtle Care Center™ is a working hospital on the first floor of the Aquarium dedicated to helping sick and injured sea turtles. In partnership with the South Carolina Department of Natural Resources, sick and injured sea turtles are transported to the Aquarium to undergo rehabilitation before release back into the wild. The Aquarium is equipped to provide critical lifesaving care, including X-rays, CT scans, IVs and surgeries. Visitors can witness sea turtle rehabilitation in action, included with admission.

The Aquarium treats the four sea turtle species native to South Carolina: green, Kemp's ridley, leatherback and loggerhead (the state reptile). As of June 2025, more than 460 sea turtles have been rescued, rehabilitated and released by the South Carolina Aquarium.

== Citizen Science ==
South Carolina Aquarium is host to a number of citizen science projects, the largest of which is the Litter Journal project, which has engaged members of the public in collecting debris from the environment. To date, over 3,000 participants have collected over 4.5 million pieces of debris from the environment. Other projects include SeaRise, which collects observations of sea levels across South Carolina, and the Good Catch Seafood Survey, collecting data on sustainable seafood in Charleston-area restaurants.

== Boeing Learning Lab at the Charleston Maritime Center ==
In April 2025, the South Carolina Aquarium opened the Boeing Learning Lab at the Charleston Maritime Center. The Boeing Learning Lab serves as the hub for the Aquarium's STEM education programming, including cost-free Dominion Energy School Programs, which provide hands-on learning experiences for South Carolina K–12 students. New technological resources and immersive space expand the Aquarium's vast slate of programs for learners of all ages across the state. The Learning Lab also functions as a community space, unlocking opportunities for direct connection to the water.

== Staffing and Funding ==
The Aquarium has approximately 200 paid staff and more than 300 volunteers. Volunteers serve a variety of roles within animal care, education and conservation.

The South Carolina Aquarium is a 501(c)(3) nonprofit organization that is funded by the support of paying guests, members, foundations and donors.
