= Adventure Aquarium =

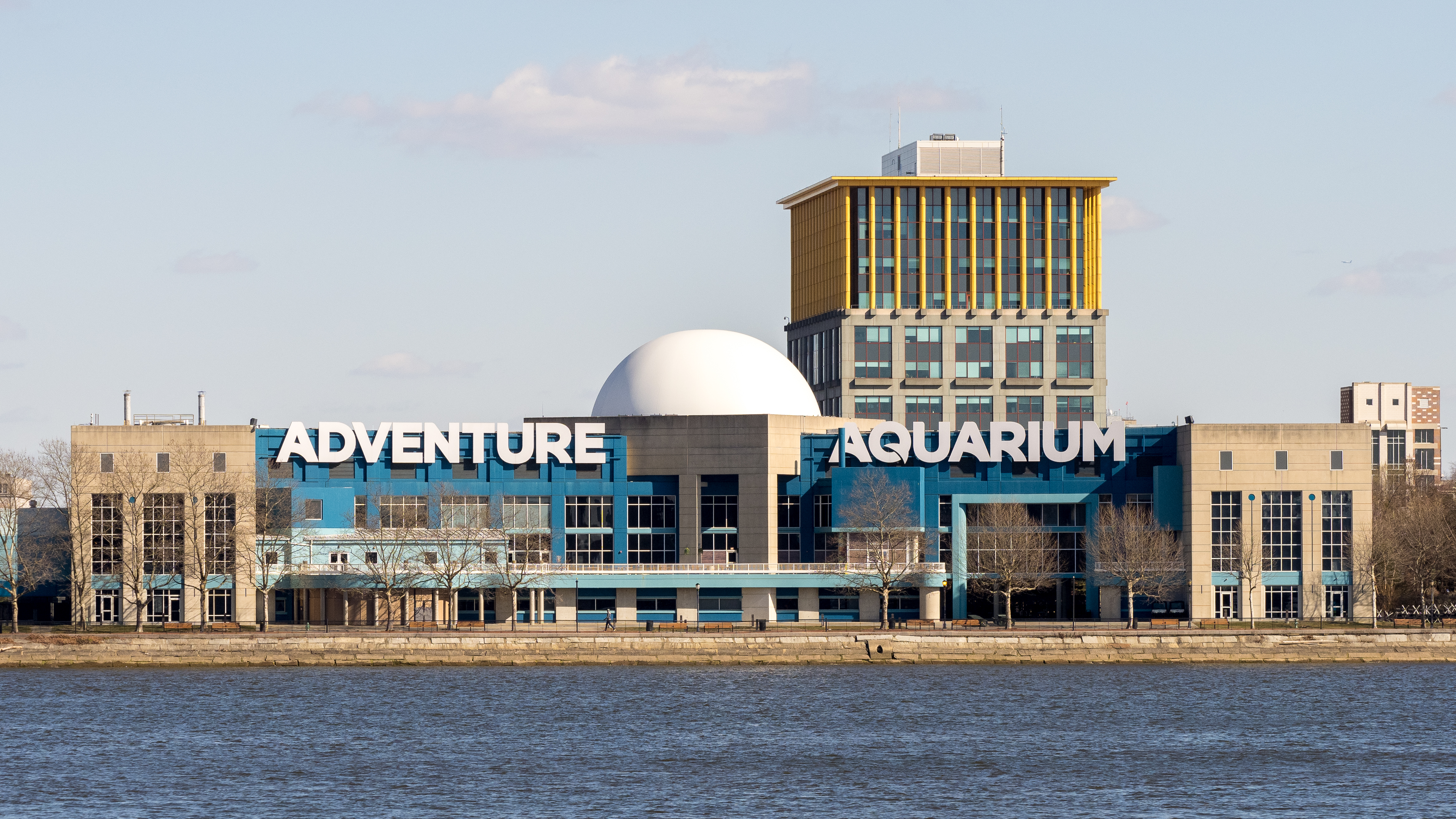
- Adventure Aquarium on the Camden Waterfront in southern New Jersey, U.S.
- Interactive map of Adventure Aquarium
- 39.945°N 75.131°W
- Date opened: February 29, 1992 (34 years ago) (May 25, 2005 opened as Adventure Aquarium)
- Location: Camden, New Jersey, U.S.
- Floor space: 200,000 sq ft (19,000 m^{2}) (public areas)
- Volume of largest tank: 760,000 US gal (2,900,000 L)
- Total volume of tanks: 2 million US gallons (7,600,000 L)
- Memberships: AZA
- Major exhibits: 11
- Public transit: River Line Aquarium PATCO Speedline City Hall
- Website: www.adventureaquarium.com

The Adventure Aquarium, formerly the Thomas H. Kean New Jersey State Aquarium, is a for-profit educational entertainment attraction operated in Camden, New Jersey on the Delaware River Camden Waterfront by Herschend. Originally opened in 1992, the facility re-opened in its current form on May 25, 2005 featuring about 8,000 animals living in varied forms of semi-aquatic, freshwater, and marine habitats. The facility has a total tank volume of over 2 million US gallons (7,600,000 L), and public floor space of 200,000 square feet (19,000 m^{2}).

== History ==
=== Origin ===
The New Jersey State Aquarium was planned to revitalize the Camden waterfront, using the aquarium as a focal point for a shopping center, a hotel, and high-rise residential buildings. This proposal aimed to counteract the negative image painted of Camden and draw in revenue that would further help the city. Inspired by the success that other cities, particularly Baltimore, had experienced with their own marine life centers, the New Jersey legislature approved the bill that included the aquarium's construction order in the late 1980s, and Governor of New Jersey Thomas Kean signed it into law. Originally known as the Thomas H. Kean New Jersey State Aquarium at Camden, the aquarium was operated by the non-profit New Jersey Academy for Aquatic Sciences, an organization chartered in 1989 to run the aquarium and further its mission of education and conservation. The Academy oversaw the design and construction of the original attraction jointly with the New Jersey Sports and Exposition Authority.

The original building was designed by the architectural firm The Hillier Group and became a centerpiece for a virtually abandoned area. Constructed primarily of cast concrete, accented by large glass and aluminum facades and topped by a large, white fabric dome, the aquarium was completed at a total cost of about $52 million. It opened on February 29, 1992.

In its first year of operation, the aquarium hosted 1.6 million visitors. But trouble arose almost immediately when visitor and critics' reviews turned decidedly negative.

The building's concrete nature was glaringly apparent both inside and out, as bare, grey concrete walls defined almost every public space. The cavernous rotunda, capped by the classic white dome, featured a deafening echo and was poorly lit. None of the exhibits were themed, and many of the tanks seemed to be lined up in neat, square rows. Graphics were almost non-existent, and the building itself tended to feel small. But the biggest problem was the animals themselves: as a New Jersey–based operation, the original aquarium displayed only native fishes, mainly brown and grey in color, and just about nothing else. By the next fiscal year (1993), attendance had plummeted to a mere 400,000. Alarmed, the aquarium's managers began a short period of intense renovation, just a year after opening day. This was featured on Michael Moore's television series TV Nation in 1995.

=== Renovation ===
The aquarium never closed during this reconstruction phase, but many exhibits were periodically offline or inaccessible, making the small building even smaller. But in 1994, Ocean Base Atlantic debuted to the public. The new attraction, designed by award-winning experience designer Bob Rogers and the design team BRC Imagination Arts, made use of the building's massive 760,000-U.S.-gallon (2,900,000-liter) Open Ocean Tank (the third largest on the continent). This new, themed exhibit introduced fish, birds, sharks, and sea turtles from all across the Atlantic Ocean, and not just from the coast of New Jersey. The new attraction opened to acclaim by the public and was also the Themed Entertainment Association's 1996 recipient of the "Award for Outstanding Achievement".

The rotunda was upgraded with the addition of a large, spinning mobile in the domed ceiling, made from more than a thousand polished aluminum fish shapes. A one-man submersible hung from the center, its lights shining on the Command Center—an information desk made to look like the bridge of an underwater lab. Even staff members complemented the new experience: the black and purple aquarium uniform, patterned on the then-hit TV show Star Trek: The Next Generation, was worn by anyone who worked in public view. These changes and modifications helped to improve the organization's image, boost attendance, and assist the New Jersey Academy for Aquatic Sciences' effort to stabilize the attraction for long-term operations.

On July 1, 1995, the New Jersey State Aquarium reopened after a further $4 million renovation to update the surroundings in order to draw in more visitors. The renovation framed the exhibits as part of a recreated Caribbean area and a replica of an actual shipwreck, the RMS Rhone.

In 1997, to commemorate the site's fifth anniversary, the New Jersey State Aquarium debuted their shark mascot, Chomp.

Over the years, the New Jersey State Aquarium once again fell into a period of stagnation, with yearly attendance holding at about 600,000. In 1999, the Camden City Garden Club announced plans to open a children's horticultural garden immediately behind the aquarium, on 4 acres (16,000 m^{2}) of land between the waterfront building and the street. Construction moved quickly, both on the garden itself and a new facade, box office, and gift shop for the aging aquarium. The combined attraction opened in 2000, but did not greatly influence yearly attendance. Work began briefly on a ride attraction in the old gift shop, but was halted halfway through due to lack of funds. Now about thirteen years old, the aquarium started to see a gradual decline in admissions.

=== The new aquarium ===
Efforts were initiated in 1999 to expand the existing aquarium physically. As it became clear that the Academy lacked the financial ability to undertake such a project, the State of New Jersey (who owns the buildings and the land) began to look for potential investors, developers, and operators for the aquarium.

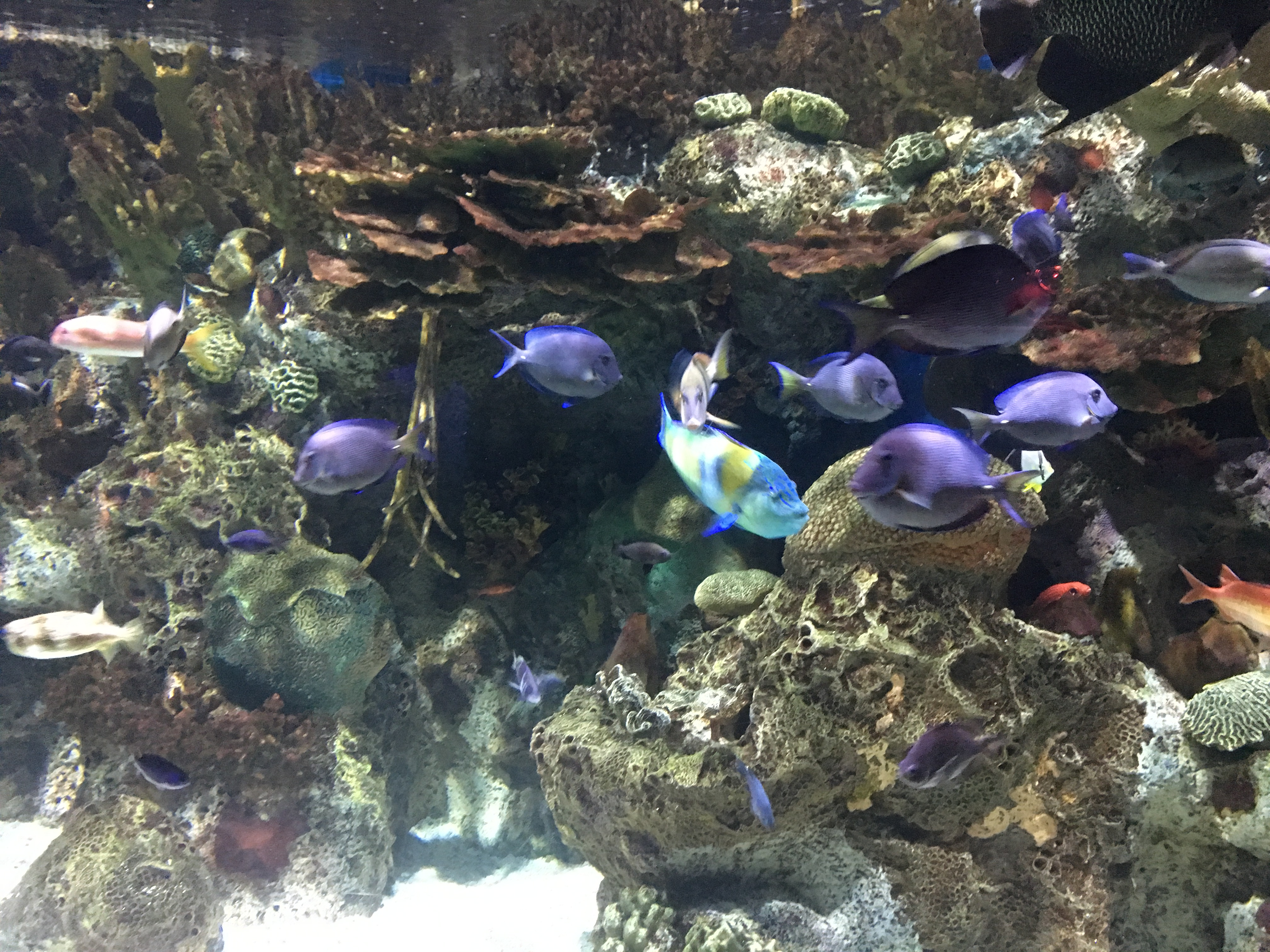
View of fish in one of the aquariums

In 2003, Columbus, Ohio-based Steiner + Associates began negotiations on a lease agreement for the existing aquarium and a development contract for the lands that surround it. The principal design and construction of a large addition on the north side of the building began in the winter of 2004. The Academy continued to operate the facility until September 7, 2004, when the doors were closed to allow a complete renovation of the existing structure.

As Steiner Entertainment took control of most operational aspects of the building (Guest Services, Marketing, Finance, Graphic Design, and Husbandry), the Academy remained to operate the Education and Research/Conservation departments. ARAMARK took over food services, and Securitas took over security of the facility.

In November 2007, officials at the Adventure Aquarium announced that Steiner + Associates had agreed to sell its controlling interest in both Adventure and Newport Aquariums to Atlanta-based Herschend Family Entertainment Corporation.

In December 6, 2009, volunteer diver Robert Large received a bite from a sand-tiger shark, permanently prohibiting him from diving again. The organization that oversaw the volunteer diver program at Adventure Aquarium, NJAAS, allegedly promised to cover all of his $75,000 medical expense; however, he received only $20,000.

== Exhibits ==
=== The South Building ===
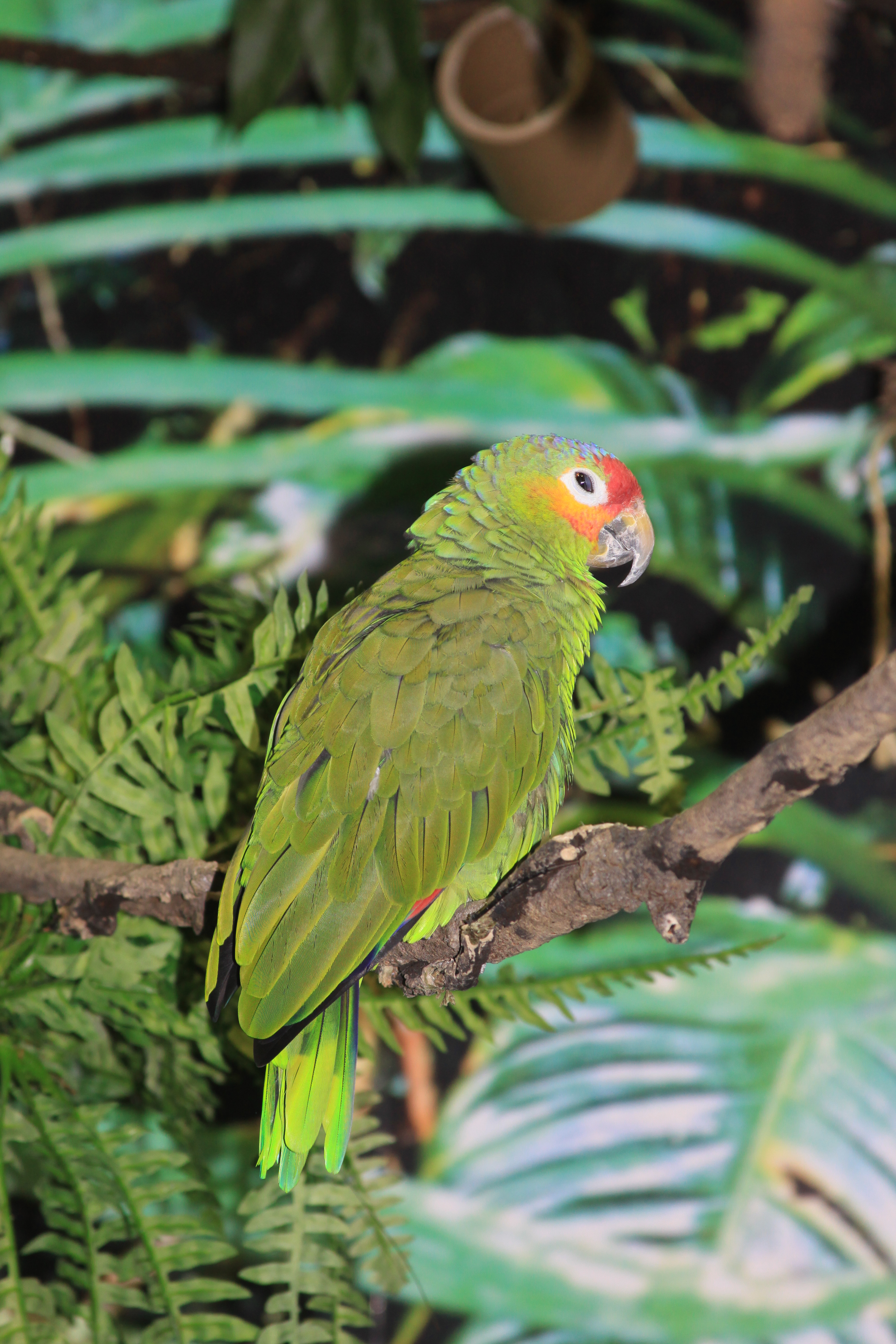
Red-lored amazon (Amazona autumnalis) in one of the exhibits

The existing building became known as the South Building, and would continue to feature native Atlantic specimens in smaller tanks and the giant Ocean Tank on the first floor (formerly Ocean Base Atlantic), as well as more unusual animals on the second floor. In 2000, the exhibit called the Conservation, Outreach and Outreach Lab, or COOL, featured the adventures of a fictitious marine biologist, Dr. Marina del Mar. Her Ocean Base Atlantic laboratory, according to the storyline, is responsible for all of the animals, displays, and information presented in the building. It features Indo-Pacific, Puerto Rican, Caribbean, and Central and South American aquatic life such as the yellow-head jawfish and coypu.

Added to this building as part of the heavy renovation was a new gateway to the Caribbean called "Irazu River Falls". This 30-foot-tall (9.1 m) tropical, riparium waterfall-tank rests in the hollow of a large, 50-foot-tall (15 m) coral reef tank designed into the original building, but never completed. It is surrounded by lush green foliage and backed by a jagged, mossy rockface. The exhibit was rebranded as "Piranha Falls" in 2017. Near the Piranha Falls exhibit there is a tank that has Diamondback terrapins, and another tank that has a common snapping turtle.

Also in this building is the "Adventure Theatre", an auditorium refitted to show 4-D films and attractions. The 154-seat theatre, sponsored by Public Service Electric and Gas, includes a 3-D film shown with environmental effects (water 'spray', wind 'gusts', and hydraulic seat movements) that combine to bring riders closer to the experience. When it opened in July 2005, the Adventure Theatre became the first built-in 4D-capable auditorium featured in an American aquarium. SimEx-Iwerks provides the technology, and the ride films are shown daily.

Many of the animals in the South Building were simply moved to better facilitate traffic flow and the organization of species. Some of the new animals in the building include the critically endangered shark ray, axolotls, Cuvier's dwarf caiman, an electric eel, and bat rays and stingrays. In 2007, the "Don't Just Look—Touch" campaign saw the addition of five new hands-on touch-exhibits to the building, including a complete refurbishment of the original "Touch-A-Shark" and "Meet-A-Creature" exhibits, plus the additions of "Touch-A-Ray", "Touch-A-Jelly", "Touch-A-Lobster" and "Touch-A-Shrimp" in the new Interactive Inlet area, on the second floor. Adventure Aquarium was one of very few facilities in the country that permitted its guests to voluntarily touch moon jellies, northern lobsters, or pink shrimp. The lobster, jellyfish, and shrimp touch tanks were subsequently removed during a 2012 renovation. That renovation turned the second floor into a "Kids' Zone", with exhibits redesigned for the education and entertainment of toddlers and small children. It also includes a small oceanic-themed play area.

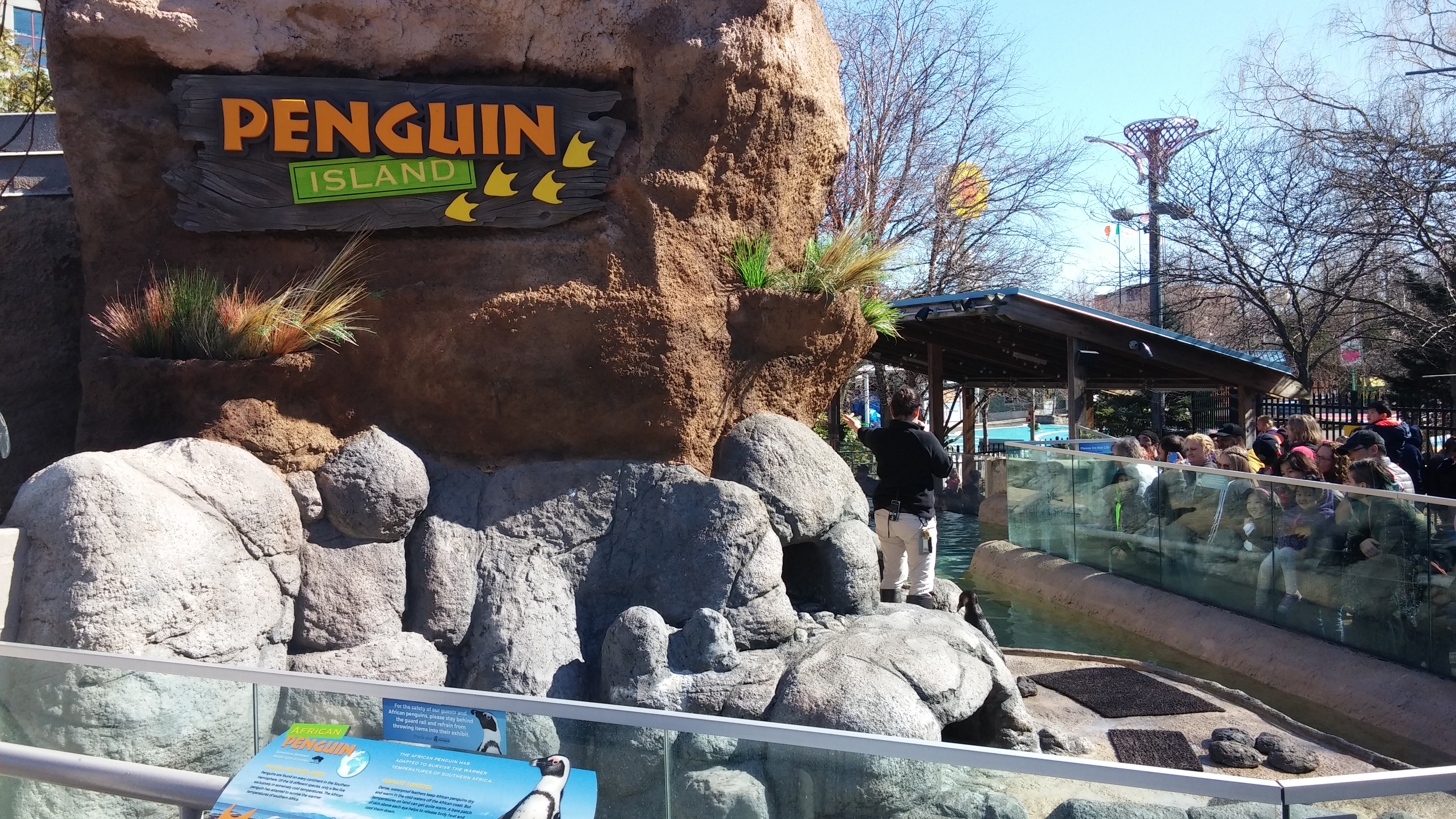
Penguin Island at Adventure Aquarium

The aquarium features African penguins in its only outdoor exhibit, "Penguin Island", which opened in 1998. The enclosure was shut down in 2017 for a refurbishment, reopening again in 2018. This was to better replicate the natural, South African coastal environment of the penguins, adding heated rock fixtures and a larger, 17k-gallon saltwater pool, with underwater viewing windows.

The aquarium once had a second outdoor exhibit, "Seal Shores"; this had originally opened with the aquarium in 1992, and housed harbor and grey seals. Seal Shores closed in October 2012, the resident seals being relocated to the National Zoo, Washington, DC. The area has since been turned into a playground called "Penguin Park".

From June 7 to September 2, 2013, "Mighty Mike" (an American alligator from Lake Talquin, Florida) was featured at the Adventure Aquarium. The alligator weighed 800 lbs. and was 14' long. Florida residents discovered Mighty Mike in 2000, requesting that he be euthanized. Instead, a trapper relocated him, aided by local reptile expert Bruce Schwdick. Since then, he has served as an ambassador animal, traveling between zoos and aquariums for educational purposes.

Eight Australian little blue penguins arrived at the aquarium in 2016 and are located in an exhibit called Little Blue Beach. Initially born at the Taronga Zoo Sydney, Australia, the birds were transferred to the Bronx Zoo for quarantine purposes before finally relocating to the Adventure Aquarium. Their enclosure includes a 415-square-foot exhibit as well as a 9,230-gallon, 3-foot-deep saltwater pool. Little Blue Beach also has a laughing kookaburra.

The aquarium rescued and rehabilitated a hatchling loggerhead sea turtle named Darwin in August 2017 and prepared it for life in the wild. The turtle was released in the fall of that year.

=== The North Building ===
The rectangular expansion building added to the northern face of the old aquarium became known as the North Building. This structure accommodates three exhibits, a food service area, main entry atrium, gift shop, casual dining restaurant, and the CURRENTS banquet ballroom.

The exhibits include "West African River Experience", featuring Nile hippopotamuses. The two females, named Button and Genny, were sent by The Walt Disney Company from their Animal Kingdom theme park in Lake Buena Vista, Florida, at relatively young ages: eight and five, respectively. In human care, the animals may live to reach at least 55 years of age.

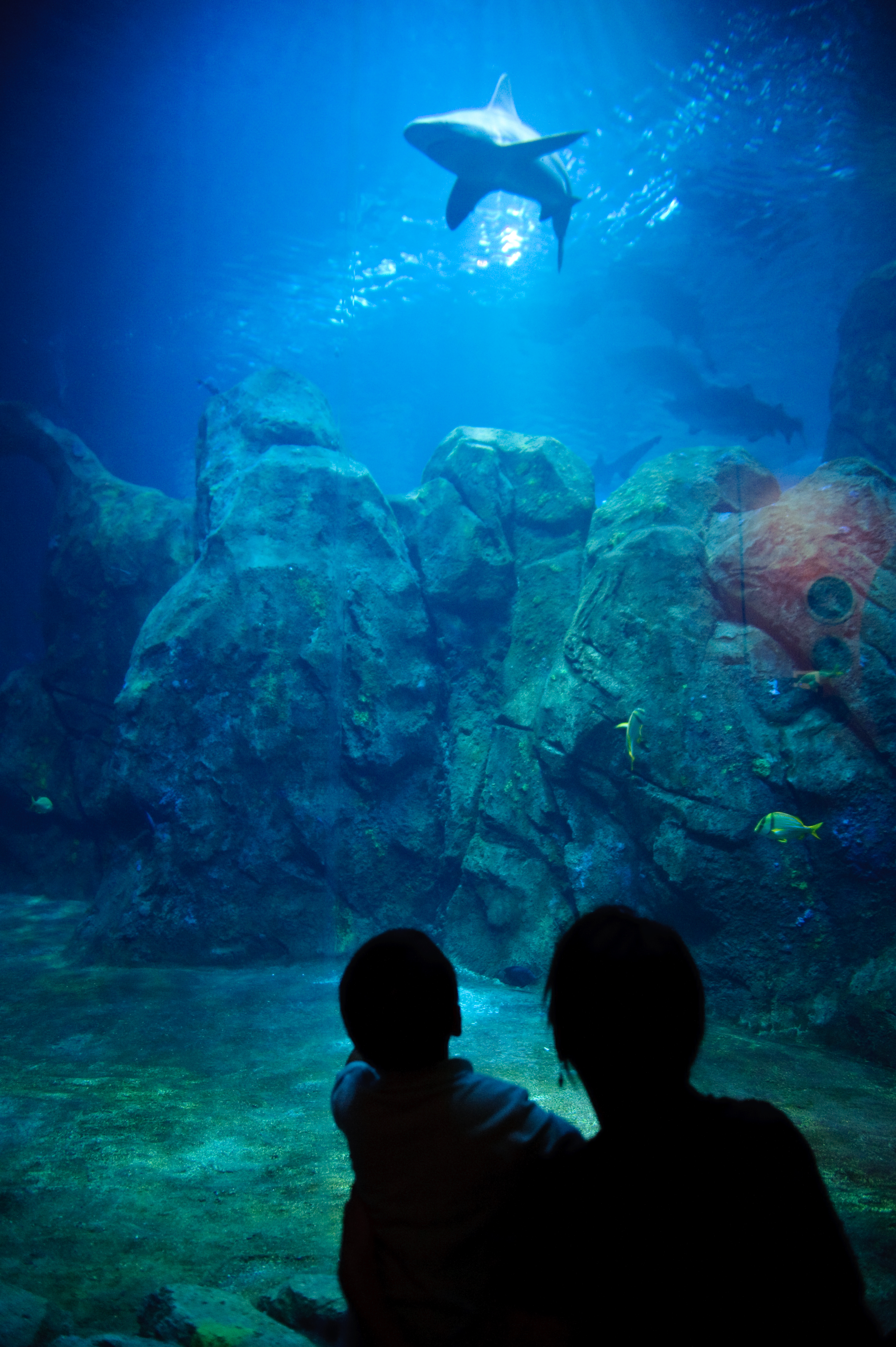
Shark at Adventure Aquarium

Also in the North Building are the Jules Verne Gallery, stocked with Japanese spider crabs, sea dragons, jellies, and a giant Pacific octopus, and the Shark Realm, featuring sand tiger, sandbar, and nurse sharks, all viewable from multiple floor-to-ceiling windows and a 40-foot (12-meter) shark tunnel, suspended directly through the center of the 550,000-U.S.-gallon (2,100,000-liter) tank. Visitors are offered, by appointment, the opportunity to swim with the sharks in the tank itself: the Shark and Ray Encounter program allows guests to snorkel along the outer perimeter of the tank inside a concrete channel before ending the swim by feeding the animals by hand in the "ray lagoon".

Above the shark tank is the Shark Bridge, a V-shaped suspension bridge. At 81 feet long, this was the longest V-shaped suspension bridge in the world as of 2016.

Wind turbines were installed on the roof of the North Building in the spring of 2007.

On September 11, 2018, the aquarium adopted a newborn Cape porcupine. It was placed in Hippo Haven. The public was asked to name the animal via donation boxes. All proceeds went to the Turgwe Hippo Trust, located in Zimbabwe.

=== Conservation efforts ===
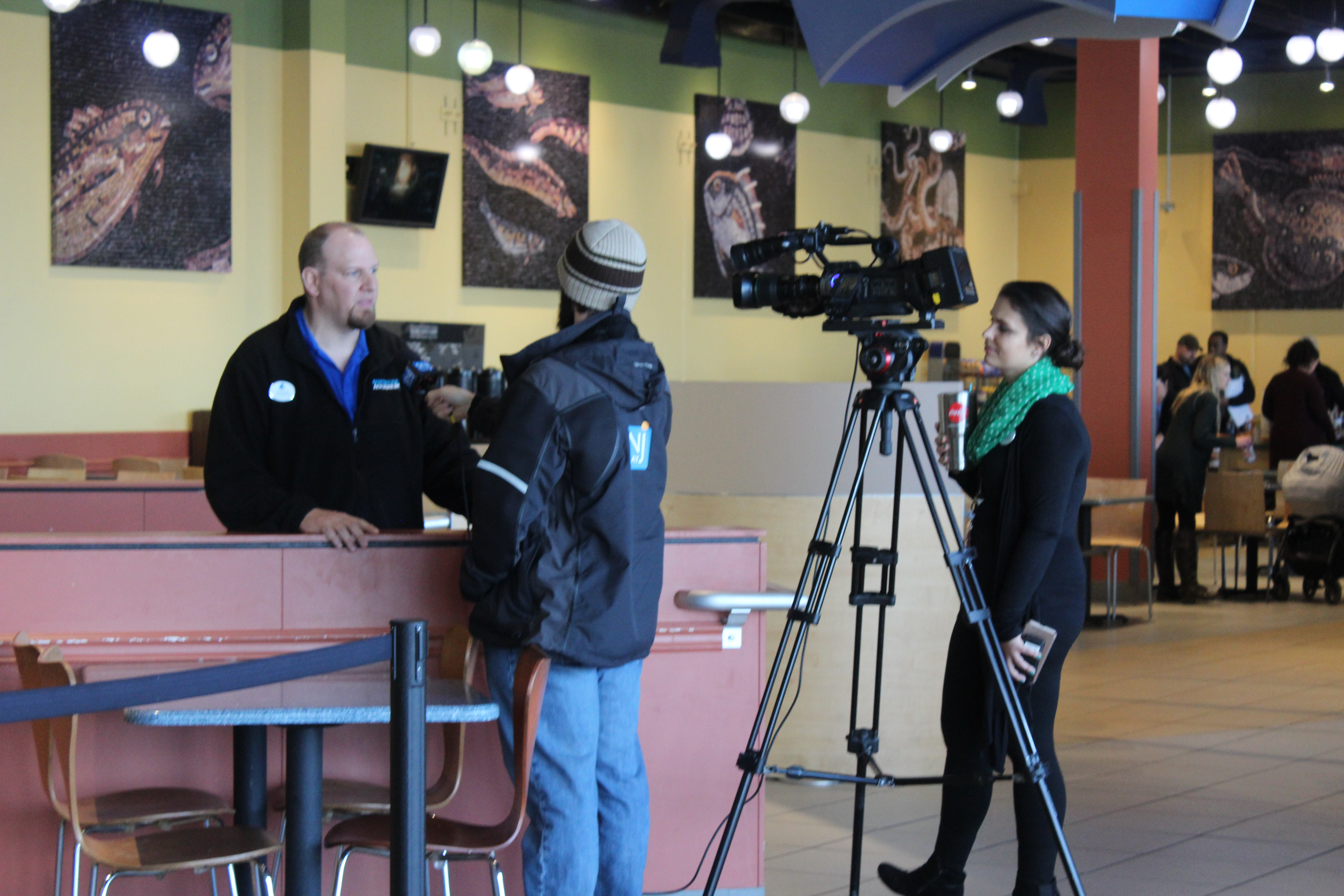
A television crew in the dining area doing an interview with staff about the current work of the aquarium

The Adventure Aquarium, in an effort to reduce oceanic pollution, uses recyclable cutlery and plant-based straws in accordance with Fins for the Future, a Delaware shore conservation effort. Previously to the COVID-19 pandemic, the aquarium held an annual Hippo Awareness festival that supported the Turgwe Hippo Trust.

On President's Day weekend 2019, it held a sea turtle awareness weekend in which it informed the public about the dangers of plastic products for sea turtle population. Additionally, the aquarium works in tandem with the North Carolina Aquarium and the Pine Knoll Shores Sea Turtle Program to take in newly hatched turtles and rehabilitate them. Their African penguin exhibit has been part of the Association of Zoos and Aquariums' species protection program since its creation in 1998. Since then, it has bred 48 African penguins.

== See also ==
- Philadelphia Aquarium (1911–1962)
- Aquarama Aquarium Theater of the Sea (1962–1969)
