= George A. Hamid Sr. =

American businessman (1896–1971)

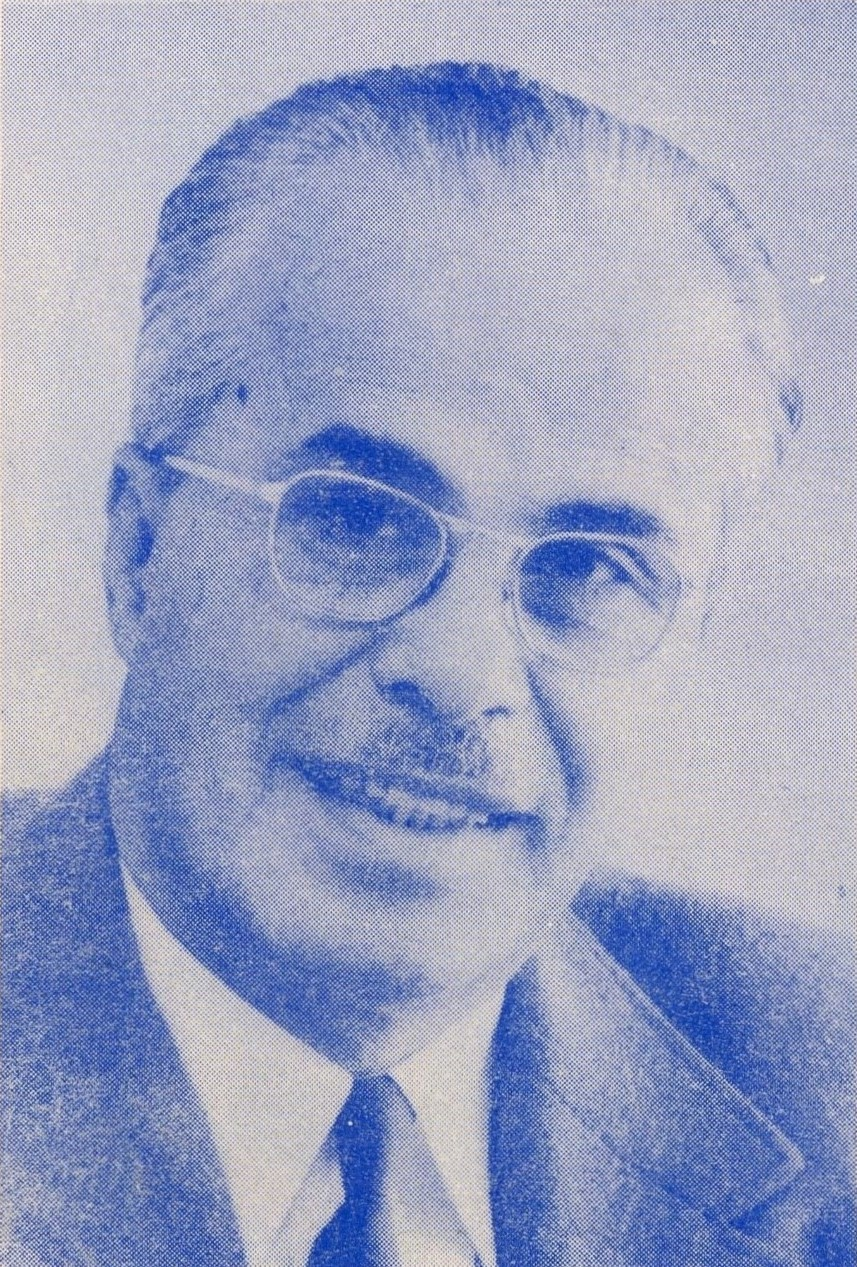
Hamid Sr., circa 1957

George Ameen Hamid Sr. (February 4, 1896 – June 1971) was an entrepreneur who made major contributions to America's outdoor amusement and entertainment industry. He established significant productions during the 20th century for fairs, circuses, carnivals and expositions. He is the father of George A. Hamid Jr. He was born in 1896 in Broumana, Ottoman Empire. He moved to America in 1907 with the Buffalo Bill Wild West show, and later founded the Hamid-Morton Circus with Robert Morton.

In 1953 he became President of the IAAPA (International Association of Amusement Parks and Attractions). Newsweek magazine described him in 1965 as "one of America's top entrepreneurs in outdoor entertainment". He died in 1971.

== See also ==
- Aquafair
- Aquarama Aquarium Theater of the Sea
