= Aquarama Aquarium Theater of the Sea =

Coordinates: 39.90828°N 75.17285°W

Aquarama
- Date opened: December, 1962
- Date closed: 1969 demolished
- Location: Philadelphia, Pennsylvania, U.S.

Aquarama Aquarium Theater of the Sea, also known as Aquarama, was a unique 1960s aquarium attraction located in South Philadelphia, Pennsylvania, at the intersection of Broad Street and Hartranft Street, just west of the South Philadelphia Sports Complex, south of Marconi Plaza, north of FDR Park, Philadelphia Naval Shipyard and Philadelphia Naval Hospital. It adjoined the east border of the newly developed residential neighborhood Packer Park at 3300 South Broad Street.

== History ==
Aquarama was a leading 1960s educational and entertainment concept that combined the previous elements of an Aquarium zoo with theatrical aquatic circus. Even its name reflected 21st century jargon Aqua + "rama" (like Cinerama) communicating a Sea to "See" it all. This private enterprise successor to the City owned Philadelphia Aquarium, which was the first of its kind, established in 1911 and closed in 1962. The old Aquarium had been housed in the former Fairmount Water Works, which closed in 1909. Once the pumping machine were removed, The Philadelphia aquarium could move in. It opened in 1911. The building, located along the Schuylkill River, used the river and some of the original piping for its water supply. It was a success until sometime in the 1940s, with over one million visitors annually. Following the second more poor the facility fell into disrepair, and exhibits diminished in variety and became known more for dead fish and a building infested with rodents. The City failed to provide funds to build a new public Aquarium in Fairmount Park, which was recommended by the Fairmount Park Commission. Frustration led to raising $3 million of private funds to build Aquarama on the 10-acre (40,000 m^{2}) site in South Philadelphia.

Aquarama Entrance

The South Philadelphia site was selected to gain a benefit from a larger development concept for the area near Municipal Stadium. The area was the former site of the United States Sesqui-Centennial in 1926, an exposition of 20th-century technology and American life, demolished in 1927. In the years following, ideas were percolating about a portion of the exposition grounds. It remained idle until a 1960s development plan for a modern sports and entertainment complex at the apex of Broad Street and Packer Avenue was realized with the eventual demolition of the historically remembered Municipal Stadium, by then renamed John F. Kennedy Stadium, the event site of the annual Army/Navy Game. Also, in keeping with complementary entertainment venues across from the Aquarama site on the east side of Broad Street was Park Lanes Bowling alley and the South City Drive-in movie theater.

Billing itself as “The Theater of the Sea”, Aquarama opened its doors in 1962 on South Broad Street, across from where Veterans Stadium would stand a decade later along with and the 2003 creation of the expanded South Philadelphia Sports Complex, By the late 1960s, Philadelphians began to tire of Aquarama and it was financially failing. After only 7 years of existence, Philadelphia’s “Theater of the Sea” quietly disappeared and was demolished in 1969.

== Architecture ==
The architect was Erling H. Pedersen. His design reflected the influences both International architecture and Postmodern architecture. The materials of concrete, steel and glass blended to support a cold sea-like environment. The multi glass door entrance was doubled to prevent escape of both heat and cool air in the summer. The exterior of the building was composed of concrete sections of offset angled panels, porticos with multi-colored and multi-textured tiles and adorned with wave shaped canopies symbolizing the ocean. The colors of cream-yellow and green predominate. The floors of the building were terrazzo. The site plan had three distinct sections composed of a one-floor pavilion building with two interior sections estimated at 45,000 square feet (4,200 m^{2}) and an outdoor natural ocean grounds section:

- Wonders of the Sea: The open spacious entrance had along the left side a huge unique two-story shaped circular 155,000 gallon fresh water tank that visitors could walk around on a ramp to view a community of various fish and also view the exhibits of smaller aquarium tanks along the zig-zag wall. The floor area behind the tank was planted with tropical and semi-tropical vegetation. Across the very wide lobby was a snack bar area, souvenir shop and candy-pop-corn area.
- Theater of the Sea: Directly forward and across the entrance was an exhibition theater. The sloping depressed structure held a "fish bowl" 150,000-gallon tank, 100 by 25-foot (7.6 m), that was surrounded by 13 rows of bleachers with a capacity of 1,200 seats.
- Sea dioramas on outdoor grounds: Several in-ground pools where sea life could live all year long. The exhibited whales new home was a 100,000 gallon salt water pool, that was 50 feet (15 m) in diameter eight feet deep at the edges 12 feet (3.7 m) in the middle.

== Major specimen exhibits and Entertainment ==
During Aquarama's existence in the 1960s it made quite a splash in family fun entertainment. Aquarama was in some ways like an aquarium, and in other ways like a circus, a venue fine tuned by outdoor entertainment developer George A. Hamid enterprises in 1965 when he leased the financially failing enterprise started in 1962. Also a serious scientific dimension of marine life was encouraged with the addition of the U.S Government, and private corporations General Electric, and Sperry Corporation performing various studies of underwater cardiograms, weightlessness, taking recordings and evaluating communications among dolphins /(Porpoises). Sperry featured the Aquarama dolphins in advertisements.

Main Plaza: The entrance area was an open plaza with an impressive three-story circular tank. Fish of every size, shape and color would swim endlessly around this giant circular glass tank including two giant 300-pound sea turtles and a human skin diver who would interact audibly and answer questions from the visiting audience. A ramp with a railing encircled the center tank so people could walk around, perusing the aquatic contents. Along the wall were many smaller aquariums filled with exotic fish, other aquatic life and included a porpoise tank.

Aquatic Arena Theater: In addition to the exhibitions there was a water arena that included performances of porpoises, starring whales "Willie and Winky" and aquatic events. The arena theater section consisted of a huge rectangular pool surrounded by raised bench seating. Trained seals would honk out “How Dry I Am” on a set of bulb horns, and several times a day, dolphins would rescue a clown named "Flippy". The show featured James H. Crovetti, Sr., as Flippy the Clown. The Master of Ceremonies would call out, “Flippy, where are you?” The spotlights would come on and there was Flippy the Clown, hanging 40 feet above the waters of the Aquarama’s indoor arena pool, hanging from a scaffolding he would roll out from the back wall where the holding tanks that the dolphins were kept in were located.. Flippy would throw down various items such as rings, balls, and toys that the dolphins would balance on their noses. At the end of this segment of the show, the Master of Ceremonies would shout, “OK Flippy, come on down, but be very careful!” Flippy would push back the scaffolding, he would pretend to forget to let go of one of the hand bars used to push back the scaffolding leaving him hanging 40 feet above the waters of the main show tank! He would hang there for at least 2 minutes interacting with the Master of Ceremonies saying “Hang on Flippy, we're coming to get you!” Flippy would let go making the 40-foot plunge into the tank feet first so that his flippers would create the biggest splash possible. The dolphins would rescue Flippy. There was no belly flop! He would do this dangerous trick 4 times a day. Attractive young women would swim in the tank(s) to appear like mermaids and entertain the curiosity of the visitors. As lights went on at show time six porpoises, each weighing about 300 pounds and 10 feet (3.0 m) long would start in a "Philly" style dance version of the "Twist" made popular by home town recording star Chubby Checker. Philadelphia radio and TV personality Gene Arnold hosted many shows there, as did the later "Voice of the Flyers," Gene Hart.

Other Areas: An outdoor area had open pools for other displays of seasonal exhibits and a place for visitors to meander and wander. Following the show, patrons could wander out into the concession area and spend their spare change on souvenirs, or on watching chickens, ducks and small animals perform tricks in tiny coin-operated booths. Many promotional gimmicks were used to attract visitors. The premises was rented for parties, teen dances and a movie theater was built on the grounds to increase visitor appeal. This included the 20th century outdoor entertainment entrepreneur George Hamid, who leased the facility and brought from Atlantic City the famous Diving Horse attraction. Even this attempt failed as the diver missed the foam rubber bed and wound up in the intensive care unit of the nearby hospital.

Featured Specimens: Pilot Whales featured as "Willie and Winky" Captured off the Newfoundland coast : Wille 12 feet (3.7 m) long weight 1 ton 5 yrs old and Winky eight feet long 600 pounds 1 year old. Six Porpoises trained in Florida, featured performing spirited fun tricks and friendly acts.

== Movie theater and ice rink or motel ==
Added on the same site in 1967 was a 750-seat movie theater, operated by the Stanley Warner Corporation, named the "Stadium Theater" with frontage on Broad Street of commercial space for a fast-food hamburger outlet, from a leading national restaurant chain, Steer Inn, in which Dick Clark had an interest. An ice skating rink combined with roller skating was planned but never built. In 1969, before Aquarama was demolished, a motel developer purchased the property with the intent to turn the existing building with the tanks into an aquatic-themed motel. This plan was not successful.

== Media broadcast and event history ==
Points of interest evolved for both radio and TV broadcasting. Before the "Voice of the Flyers" was indeed that, Gene Hart, a former school teacher, was an announcer and an assistant public relations director for the Aquarama. When Philadelphia landed an NHL ice hockey franchise, Hart submitted some audition tapes and got the job, but he still worked full-time for the aquarium, according to the Flyers Web site. The front entrance plaza was a great public space appropriate for High School Proms (as South Philadelphia High School) and weddings. Well-known radio and television personality Ed Hurst, a native of Atlantic City NJ with performances at Steel Pier, originated a live teenage dance formatted like American Bandstand telecast from the Aquarama on Saturday afternoons using the open spaces with the undersea theme as a background. "Ed Hurst at Aquarama" aired on Channel 3 but was left with no archived video history to review. A frequent co-host was TV reporterJim O'Brien and radio personality Jerry Blavat. Ed Hurst reminisced about his old aquatic haunt for WHYY-TV on Philadelphia Channel 12's popular series "More Things That Aren't There Anymore," which was produced by Public Television's WHYY-TV personality/producer Ed Cunningham. Among other things erased over time was a record album of children songs produced by public relations director Sidney Hantman with featured songs like "Percy the Pink Piranha."

== See also ==
- Philadelphia Aquarium
- Philadelphia Zoo
- Camden Aquarium
