= Aquarium station (River Line) =

Light rail station in New Jersey, USA

Aquarium
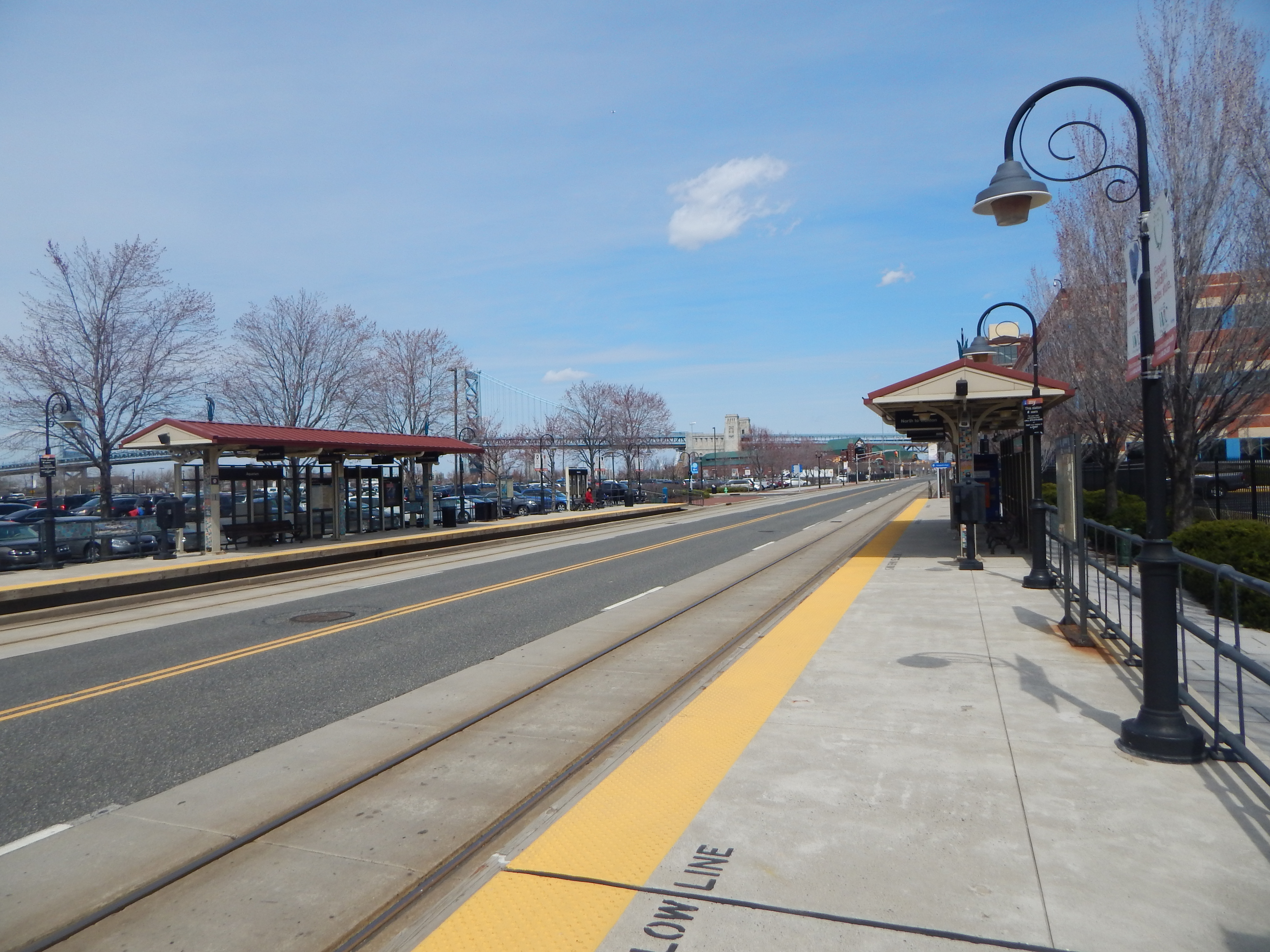
- Aquarium station in April 2015.

General information
- Location: 2 Delaware Avenue; Camden, New Jersey
- Coordinates: 39°56′44″N 75°7′43″W
- Owner: New Jersey Transit
- Platforms: 2 side platforms (on sidewalk)
- Tracks: 2
- Connections: NJ Transit Bus: 404, 417, 419; RiverLink Ferry

Construction
- Accessible: yes

Other information
- Fare zone: 1

History
- Opened: March 15, 2004

Services
| Preceding station | NJ Transit | Following station |
|---|---|---|
| Entertainment Center Terminus | River Line | Cooper Street–Rutgers University toward Trenton |
Location

Aquarium station is a station on the River Line light rail system, located on Delaware Avenue in Camden, New Jersey. It is named for the nearby Adventure Aquarium located in on the Camden Waterfront.

The station opened on March 15, 2004. Southbound service from the station is available to the line's terminus at Entertainment Center. Northbound service is available to the Walter Rand Transportation Center in Camden, with transfer to the PATCO Speedline Philadelphia, Pennsylvania. With intermediary stops the line continues to Trenton Transit Center served by New Jersey Transit, SEPTA trains, and Amtrak trains.
