= Pennsauken (disambiguation) =

Pennsauken Township, New Jersey or "Pennsauken" for short, is a community in Camden County, New Jersey.

Pennsauken may also refer to the following places in New Jersey:

== Schools ==
- Pennsauken High School
- Pennsauken Public Schools
- Pennsauken Technical High School

== Streams ==
- Pennsauken Creek, a tributary of the Delaware River

== Train stations ==
- Pennsauken Transit Center
- Pennsauken-Route 73 (River Line station)
- 36th Street (River Line station)
