= Cinnaminson station =

Light rail station in New Jersey, US

Cinnaminson
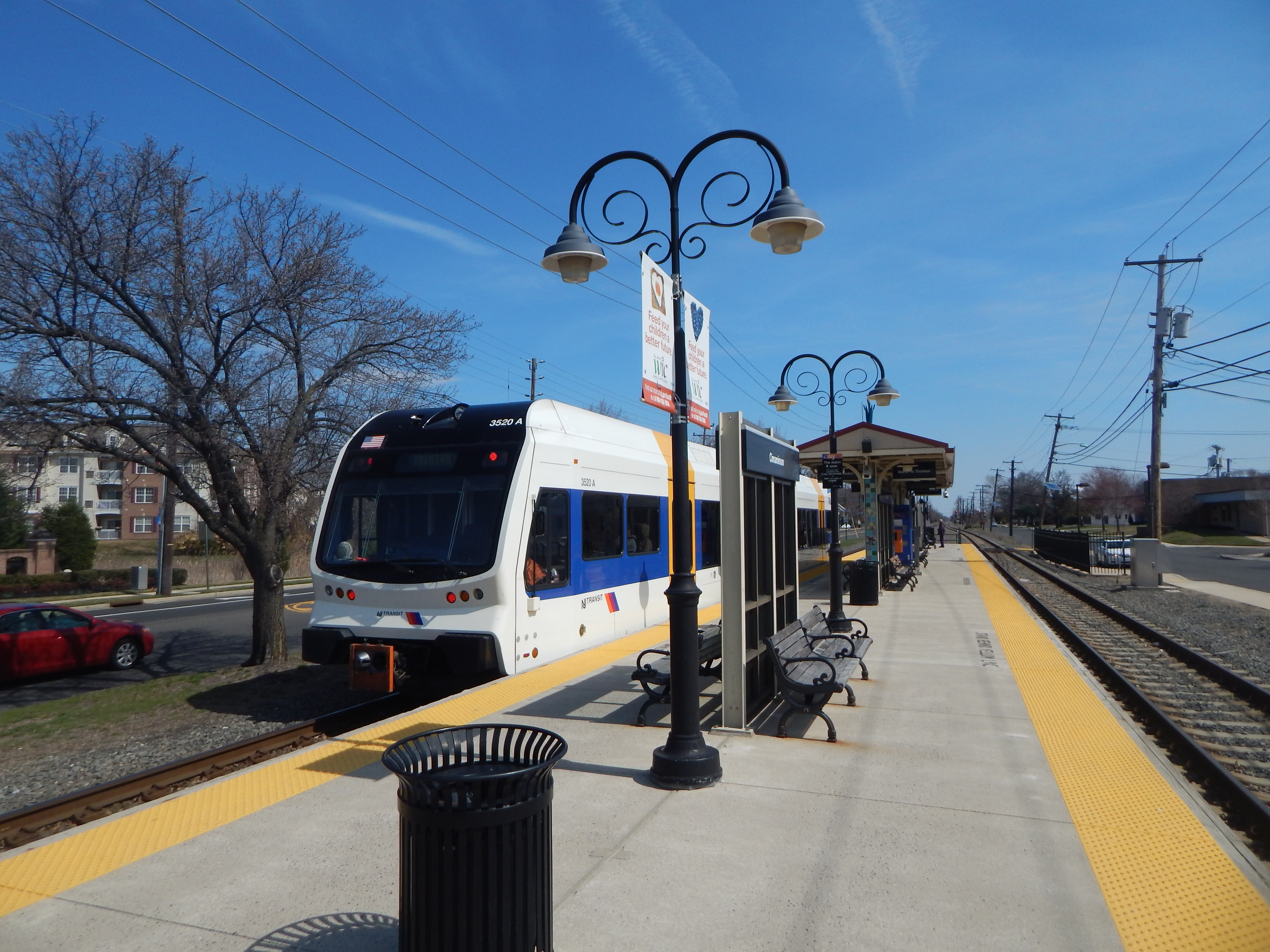
- Cinnaminson station in April 2015.

General information
- Location: Broad Street; Cinnaminson, New Jersey
- Coordinates: 40°1′0″N 75°0′0″W
- Owner: New Jersey Transit
- Platforms: 1 island platform
- Tracks: 2
- Connections: NJ Transit Bus: 419

Construction
- Parking: 253 spaces, 8 accessible spaces
- Accessible: Yes

Other information
- Fare zone: 1

History
- Opened: March 15, 2004

Services
Preceding station	NJ Transit	Following station
Riverton toward Entertainment Center	River Line	Riverside toward Trenton
Location

Cinnaminson station is a station on the River Line light rail system, located on Broad Street in Cinnaminson, New Jersey.

The station opened on March 15, 2004. Southbound service from the station is available to Camden, New Jersey. Northbound service is available to the Trenton Rail Station with connections to New Jersey Transit trains to New York City, SEPTA trains to Philadelphia, Pennsylvania, and Amtrak trains. Transfer to the PATCO Speedline is available at the Walter Rand Transportation Center.

The station is located across from the Cinnaminson Harbour condominium community. A pedestrian crosswalk provides access to the development, as well as to Bannard Street across the tracks.
