= Riverton station =

Light rail station in New Jersey, USA

Riverton
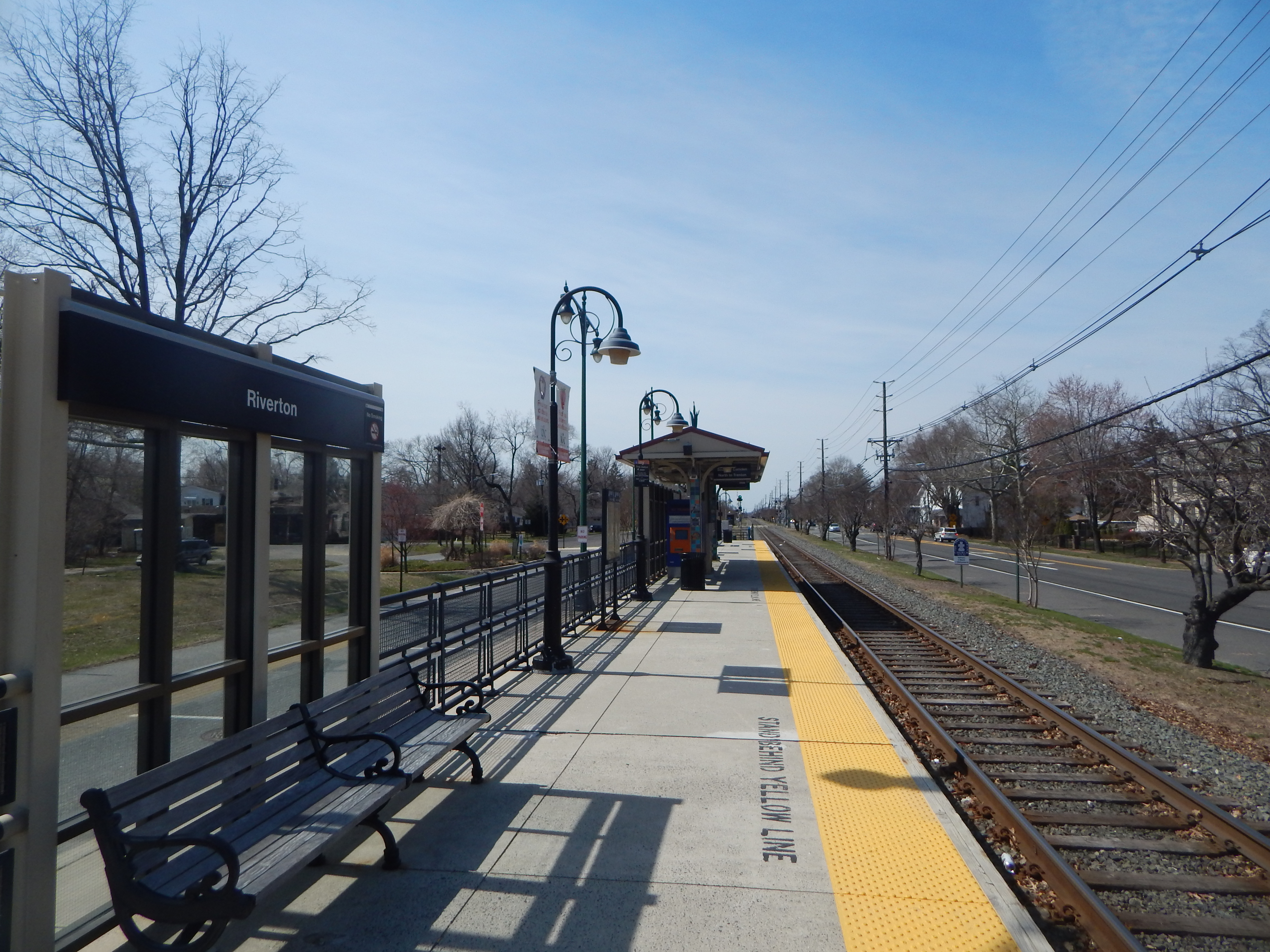
- Riverton station in April 2015.

General information
- Location: 60 Main Street; Riverton, New Jersey
- Coordinates: 40°0′32″N 75°0′47″W
- Owner: New Jersey Transit
- Platforms: 1 side platform
- Tracks: 1
- Connections: NJ Transit Bus: 419

Construction
- Parking: 44 spaces, 4 accessible spaces
- Cycle facilities: Racks
- Accessible: Yes

Other information
- Fare zone: 1

History
- Opened: March 15, 2004

Services
Preceding station	NJ Transit	Following station
Palmyra toward Entertainment Center	River Line	Cinnaminson toward Trenton

Former services
Preceding station	Pennsylvania Railroad	Following station
Palmyra toward Camden	Amboy Branch	Riverside toward South Amboy
Location

Riverton station is a station on the River Line light rail system, located along South Broad Street between Thomas Avenue and Main Street in Riverton, New Jersey, though it is officially addressed as being on Main Street.

The station opened on March 15, 2004. Southbound service from the station is available to Camden, New Jersey. Northbound service is available to the Trenton Rail Station with connections to New Jersey Transit trains to New York City, SEPTA trains to Philadelphia, Pennsylvania, and Amtrak trains. Transfer to the PATCO Speedline is available at the Walter Rand Transportation Center.

The station contains a traffic circle at South Broad Street and Lippincott Avenue, with non-functioning railroad signals and a sign on the evolution of grade crossing signs in front of a bicycle rack. A similar display can be found at Burlington South further to the northeast.
