= Pennsauken Transit Center =

Train station in New Jersey, USA

- River Line and Atlantic City Line trains at the station in 2025

General information
- Location: Derousse Avenue at Zimmerman Avenue; Pennsauken Township, New Jersey
- Coordinates: 39°58′41″N 75°03′44″W
- Owner: New Jersey Transit
- Platforms: 2 side platforms (Atlantic City Line); 1 side platform (River Line)
- Tracks: 2 (Atlantic City Line); 1 (River Line)
- Connections: NJ Transit Bus: 404, 417, 419

Construction
- Platform levels: 2
- Parking: 261 spaces, 7 accessible spaces
- Cycle facilities: Racks
- Accessible: Yes

Other information
- Station code: Amtrak: PNK

History
- Opened: October 14, 2013

Passengers
- 2025: 73 (average weekday)
- Rank: 130 of 153

Services
Preceding station	NJ Transit	Following station
Philadelphia Terminus	Atlantic City Line	Cherry Hill toward Atlantic City
36th Street toward Entertainment Center	River Line	Pennsauken–Route 73 toward Trenton
Location

Pennsauken Transit Center (signed as Pennsauken on the Atlantic City Line platforms) is a New Jersey Transit train station in Pennsauken Township, in Camden County, New Jersey, United States. It serves as an intermodal transfer station between the River Line light rail and the Atlantic City Line commuter rail, as well as serving the Delair neighborhood for Pennsauken and the nearby industrial park. The station cost $39.747 million, of which $39.104 million was funded by the American Recovery and Reinvestment Act of 2009. After two years of construction, the Pennsauken Transit Center opened on October 14, 2013.

== Configuration ==
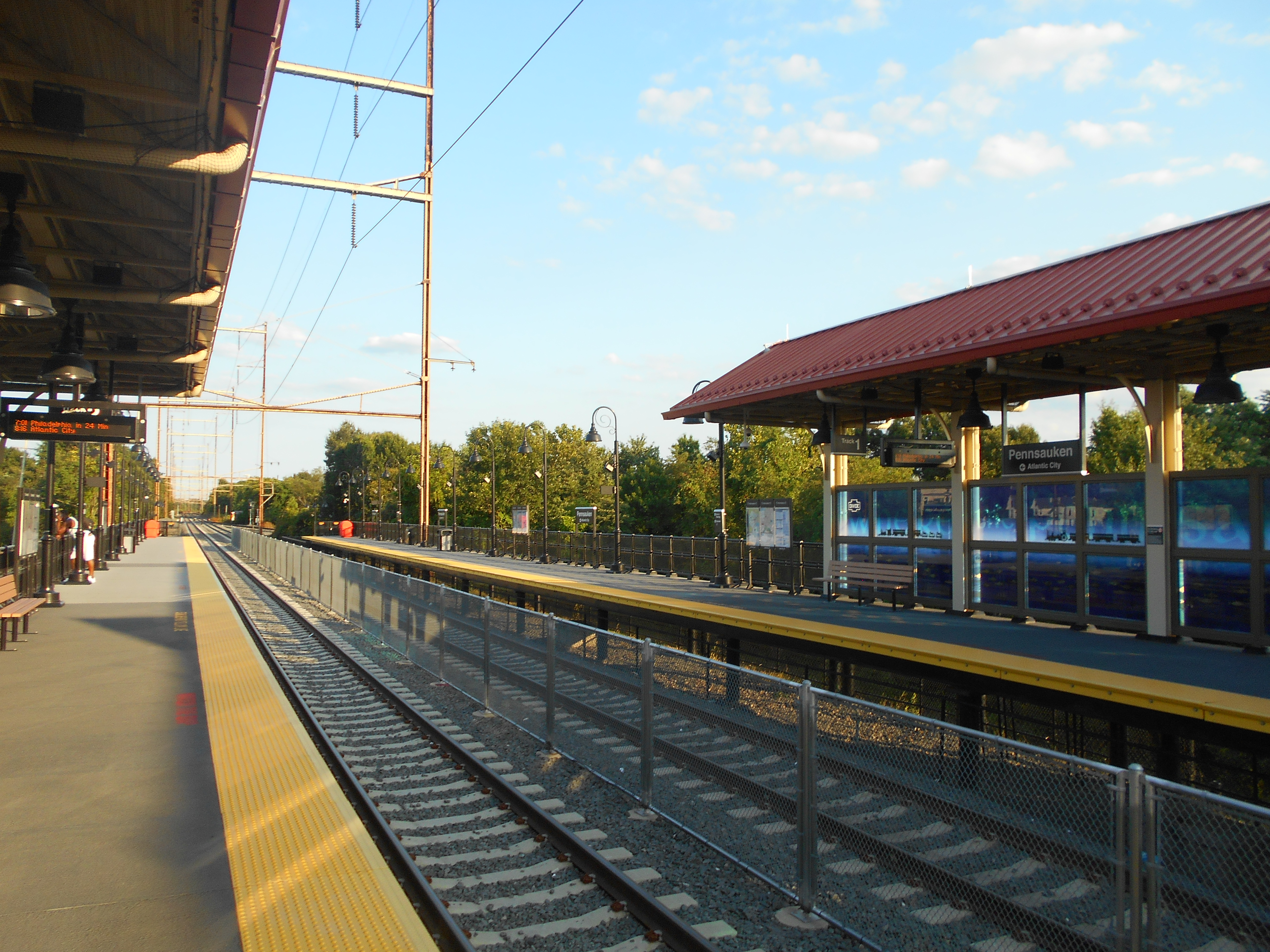
Atlantic City Line platforms at Pennsauken Transit Center

The Atlantic City Line crosses above the River Line on a high embankment at the station connection. The two levels are connected by a 38-foot (12 m)-tall three-story building, which features a glass façade designed by local artist J. Kenneth Leap as a tribute to women in Pennsauken's history. There are two 300-foot (91 m) high-level platforms with 100-foot (30 m) canopies serving the Atlantic City Line's two tracks, and one 200-foot (61 m) low platform with a 60-foot (18 m) canopy serving the River Line's single track. The station has 275 free parking spaces available to commuters. Like most NJT stations, tickets are purchased at automatic ticket machines.

As well as the station itself, the project included several new crossovers and signal installations to increase operating flexibility.

== History ==
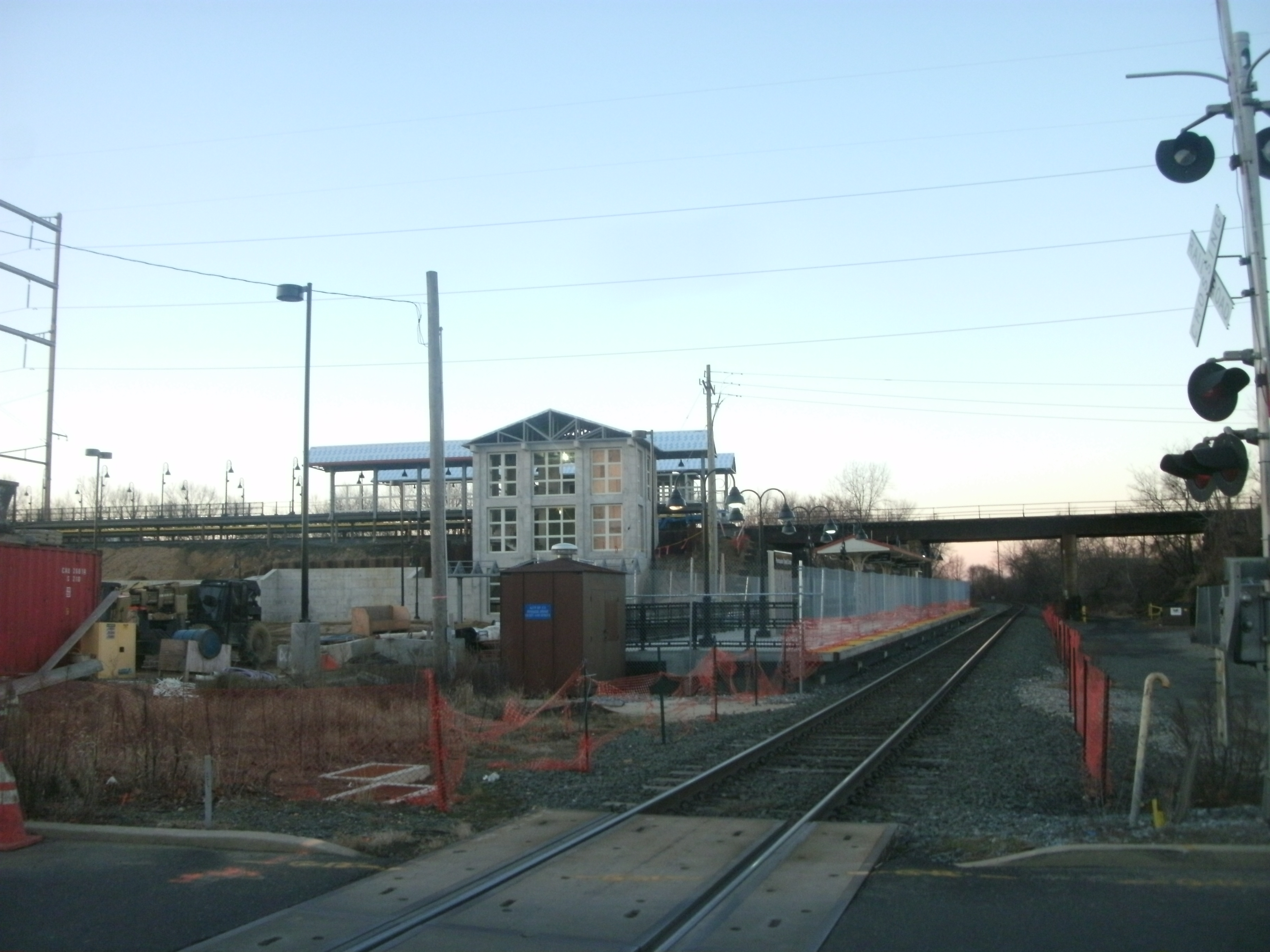
The stations under construction in January 2013

When the River Line opened in 2004, it did not include a stop in the Delair neighborhood nor a connection with the Atlantic City Line. Local opinion favored an infill station be built; planning began in earnest in 2007.

New Jersey Transit filed an environmental assessment for the project in August 2009, and received a Finding of No Significant Impact (FONSI) from the United States Environmental Protection Agency in October 2009. A ground breaking ceremony was held for the station on October 19, 2009. Construction of the River Line platform began soon after. The $13.8 million second phase of construction – the Atlantic City Line platforms, parking lot, and drainage improvements – was approved by the New Jersey Transit Board of Directors on July 13, 2011.

Construction was nearly complete by the second quarter of 2013, with only minor work remaining. In late September, New Jersey Transit announced that the station would open in mid-October. Both levels of the station opened to passenger service on October 14, 2013.

In June 2014, NJT introduced a through-fare ticket which allows for travel on the Northeast Corridor Line, the River Line, and the Atlantic City Line, which encourages connections between the lines via Pennsauken.
