= Riverside station (River Line) =

Light rail station in New Jersey, USA

Riverside
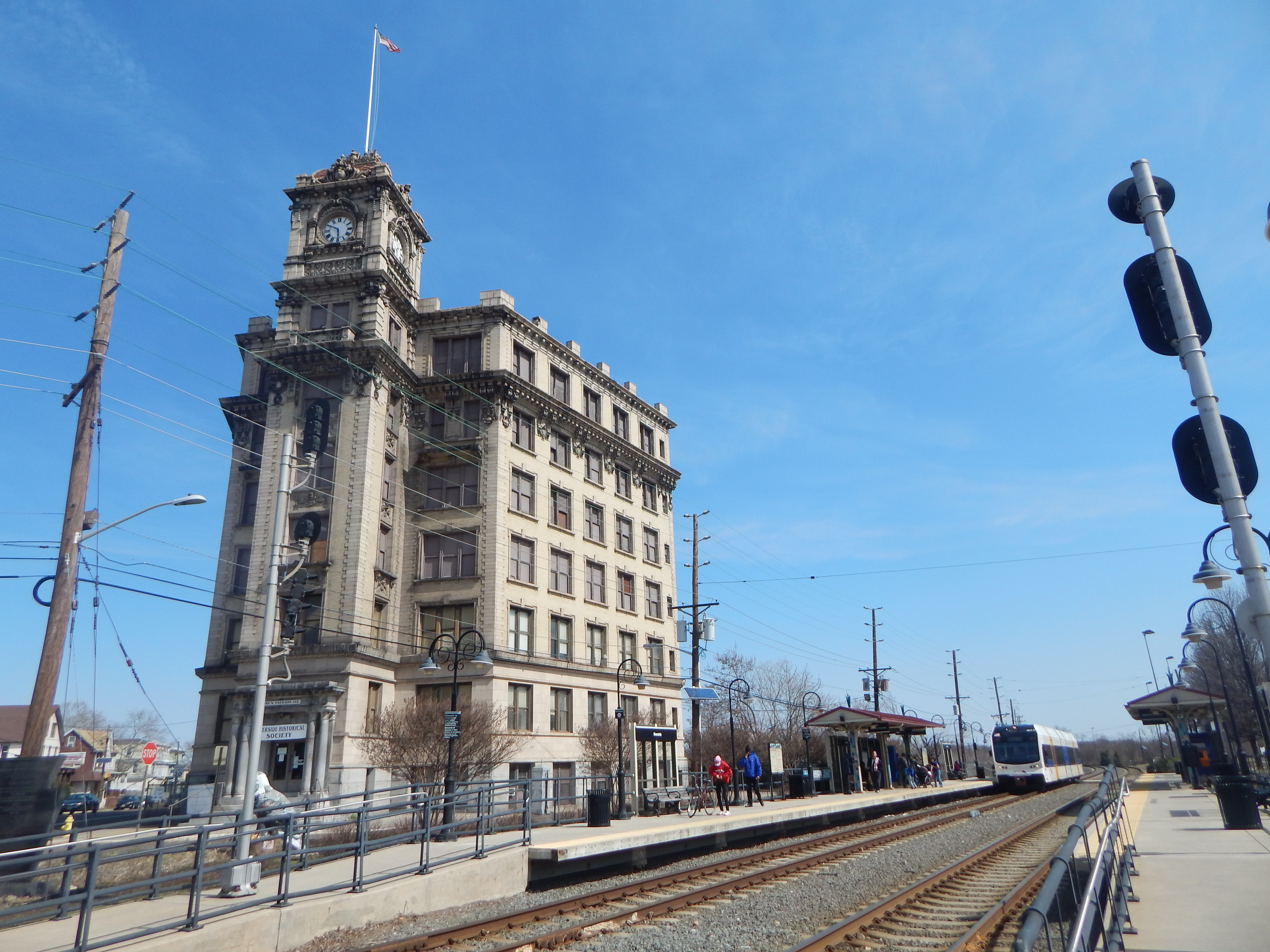
- Riverside station with the former Philadelphia Watch Case Company Building in the background

General information
- Location: Franklin Street; Riverside Township, New Jersey
- Coordinates: 40°2′21″N 74°57′32″W
- Owner: New Jersey Transit
- Platforms: 2 side platforms
- Tracks: 2
- Connections: NJ Transit Bus: 419

Construction
- Parking: 307 spaces, 8 accessible spaces
- Accessible: Yes

Other information
- Fare zone: 1

History
- Opened: March 15, 2004

Services
Preceding station	NJ Transit	Following station
Cinnaminson toward Entertainment Center	River Line	Delanco toward Trenton

Former services
Preceding station	Pennsylvania Railroad	Following station
Riverton toward Camden	Amboy Branch	Delanco toward South Amboy
Location

Riverside station is a station on the River Line light rail system, located on Franklin Street in Riverside, New Jersey. The station opened on March 15, 2004.

Southbound service from the station is available to Camden, New Jersey. It is the last station on the line before crossing the bridge over Rancocas Creek northbound to the Trenton Rail Station where there are connections to New Jersey Transit trains to New York City, SEPTA trains to Philadelphia, Pennsylvania, and Amtrak trains. Transfer to the PATCO Speedline at the Walter Rand Transportation Center.

The station stands in the shadow of the historic Philadelphia Watch Case Company Building, which has been listed on the National Register of Historic Places since January 31, 1978. The Pennsylvania Railroad's Riverside station lay across Pavilion Avenue from the current station site. Service between Trenton and Camden ended on June 28, 1963. The station building still stands and is home to the Riverside Historical Society.
