= Light rail in New Jersey =

Local rail service in urban areas of New Jersey

Light rail in New Jersey is provided by NJ Transit, a state-owned corporation which also provides bus and commuter rail services. In 2024, the light rail system had a ridership of 22,215,800. Light rail, among other forms of transit, is a major part of the state's Smart Growth policy.

== Hudson–Bergen Light Rail ==
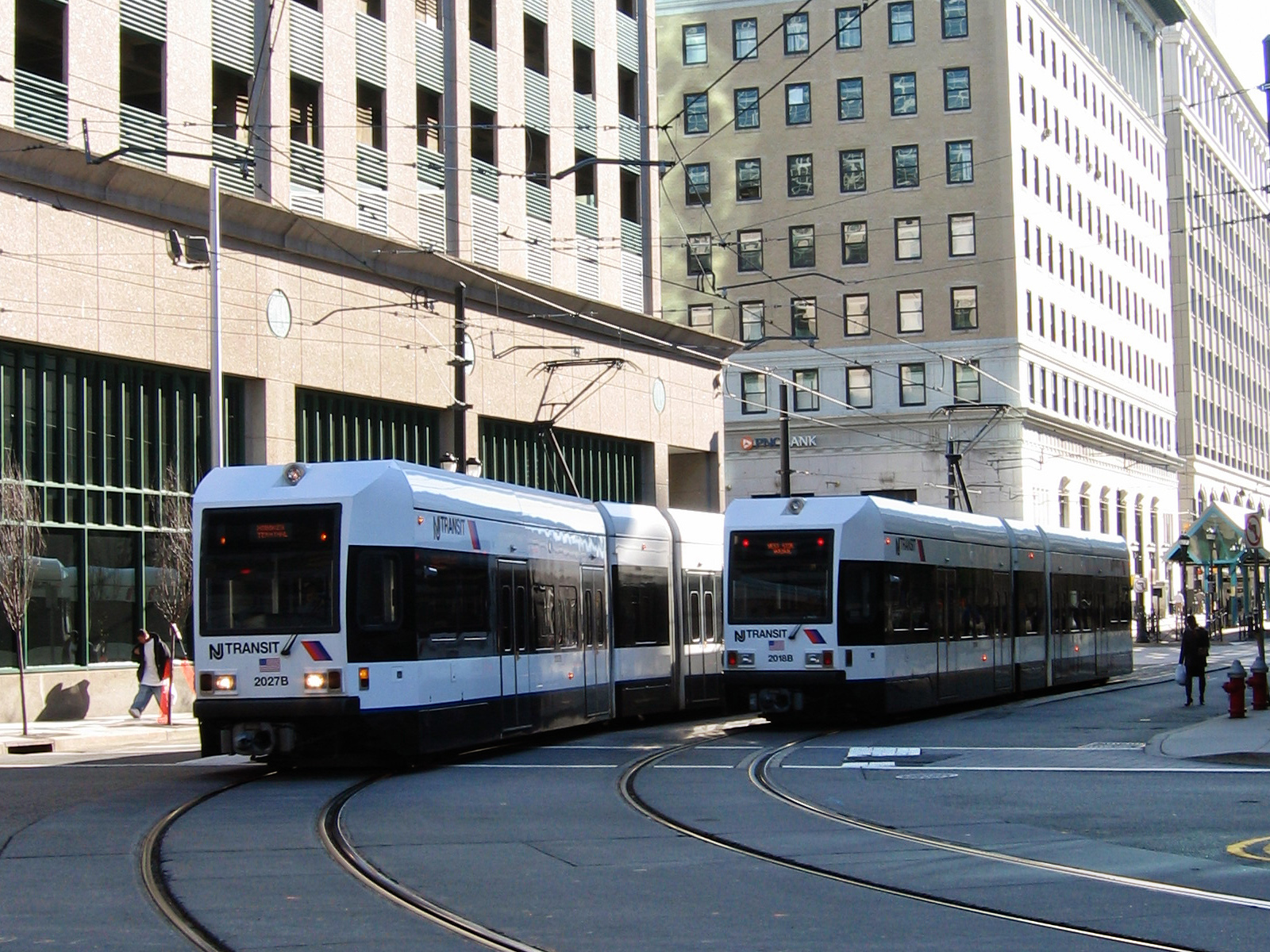
Two HBLR trains near Exchange Place

The Hudson–Bergen Light Rail (HBLR) is a service that connects the Hudson County communities of Bayonne, Jersey City, Hoboken, Weehawken, Union City, and North Bergen with 23 stops along 3 services.

This line was borne out of a public-private partnership in the mid-1990s, with Washington Group International, doing business as 21st Century Rail, chosen for a DBOM contract for the line to design, build, operate, and maintain the line for its first 15 years. With construction beginning in 1997, the first segments, from Exchange Place to West Side Avenue and 34th Street opening in 2000, with service to Pavonia-Newport, Hoboken Terminal, 22nd Street, Lincoln Harbor, and Tonnelle Avenue opening in later segments between 2000 and 2005, and 8th Street opening in 2011.

The current HBLR fleet consists of 53 low-floor electric light rail cars.

As of October 1, 2015, the current one-way fare on the HBLR is $2.25. The line works under a proof-of-payment system, requiring all riders to have a validated ticket (validated prior to boarding the train), transfer, or a valid pass.

== Newark Light Rail ==
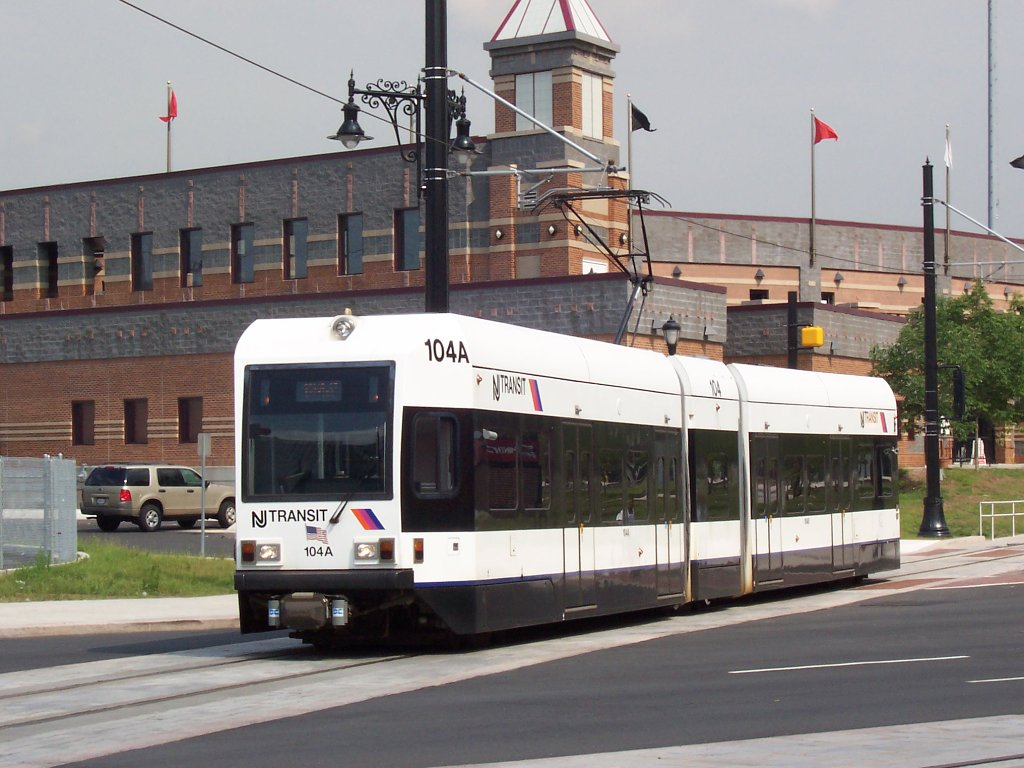
Newark Light Rail train No. 104 crosses Broad Street near Riverfront Stadium

The Newark Light Rail (NLR) is a light rail system composed of two sections, the Newark City Subway, originally opened in the 1930s by PSCT as the No. 7 line, and the sole surviving line of several that ran into this tunnel, and the Broad Street Line which operates from Newark Penn to Newark Broad Street via Washington Park and Riverfront Stadium, which opened in 2006. This line is also included in NJT Bus' Central Division, dating back to its days as a streetcar line.

Originally constructed as a streetcar line using PCC streetcars, the Newark City Subway ran from Newark Penn to a loop at the Newark city line located at what was then called Franklin Avenue. With the conversion of operation from PCC streetcars to cars similar to what is used on the HBLR, the Franklin Avenue loop was removed and replaced by Branch Brook Park, with service extended to Grove Street.

NLR utilizes a fleet of 20 cars, similar to the HBLR fleet.

As of October 1, 2015, NLR one-way fares are equivalent to a one-zone bus ride of $1.60, with the ability to purchase through-tickets valid for a ride on Newark Light Rail and on a connecting bus to Bloomfield, Passaic and points beyond up to 4 local bus fare zones (generally, to Paterson, Willowbrook, and West Caldwell). The line works under a proof-of-payment system, requiring all riders to have a validated ticket (validated prior to boarding the train), transfer, bus through-ticket, or a valid pass.

== River Line ==
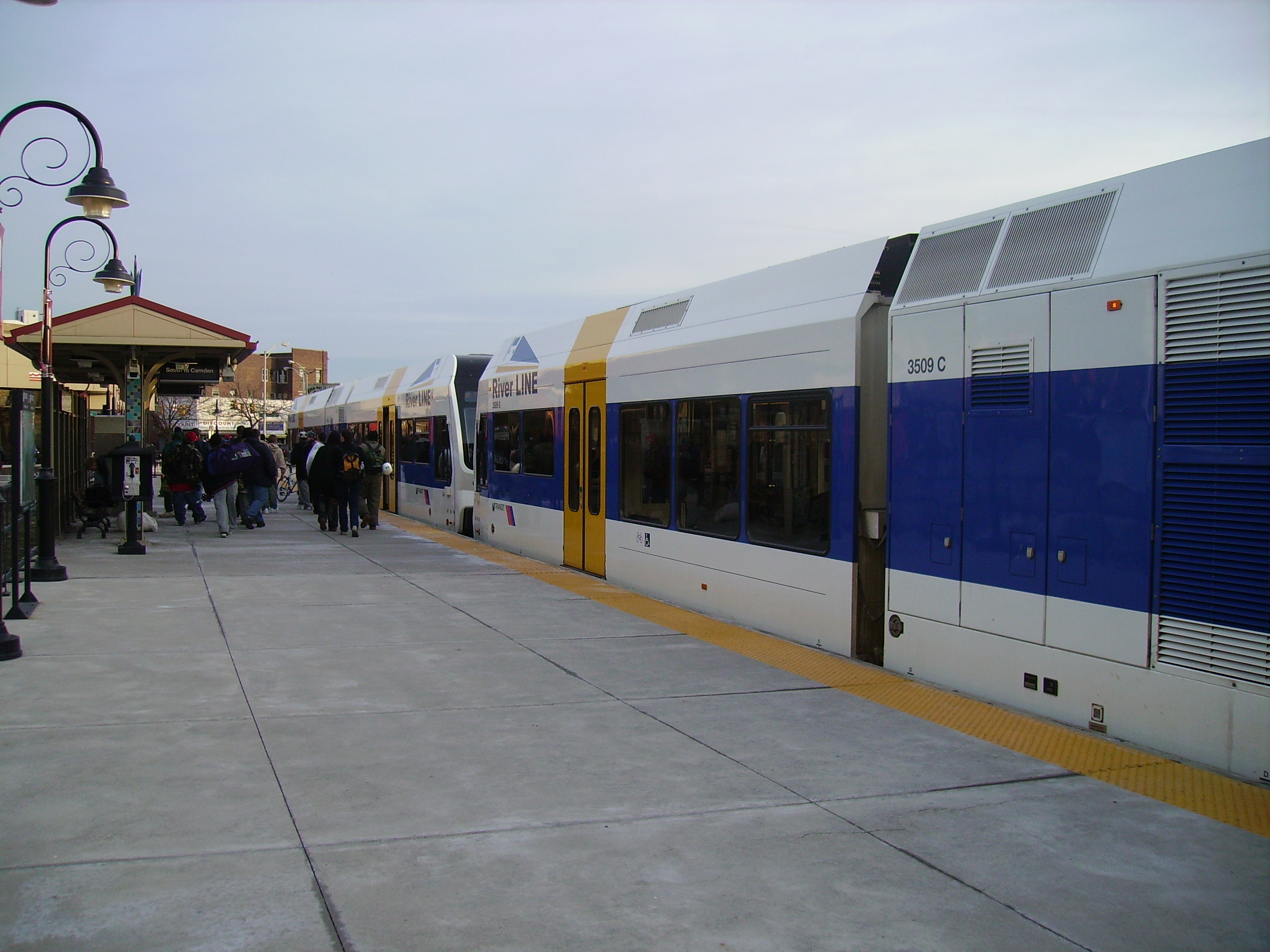
A two-car River Line train boards customers at Walter Rand Transportation Center

The River Line is a hybrid rail service operating from Trenton to Entertainment Center in Camden, with the line, except at the ends, running along the former Bordentown Secondary of Conrail, servicing 30 stops along the 34-mile route in the Route 130 corridor. This line is operated under contract to New Jersey Transit by Southern New Jersey Rail Group, a Bombardier/Bechtel joint-venture.

As of October 1, 2015, River Line fares are equivalent to a one-zone bus ride of $1.60. The line works under a proof-of-payment system, requiring all riders to have a validated ticket (validated prior to boarding the train), transfer, bus through-ticket, or a valid pass.

== Planned projects ==
The Northern Branch Corridor Project is a plan to extend the Hudson-Bergen Light Rail past its current terminus at Tonnelle Avenue to Englewood along the Northern Branch, an existing freight rail line. It reached the final environmental impact statement stage, but approvals were later withdrawn.

The Glassboro–Camden Line, is proposed diesel light rail from the Walter Rand Transportation Center in Camden to Rowan University in Glassboro, partially along an existing freight rail line.

The Passaic–Bergen–Hudson Transit Project is a project under study by NJ Transit to reintroduce passenger service on a portion of the New York, Susquehanna and Western Railway (NYSW) right-of-way (ROW) in Passaic, Bergen and Hudson counties using newly built, FRA-compliant diesel multiple unit rail cars. Plans call for service to run from Hawthorne south through Paterson, east to Hackensack and then southeast to North Bergen, where it would join the Hudson-Bergen Light Rail (HBLR).

== Canceled projects ==
The Newark-Elizabeth Rail Link and the Union County Light Rail have not advanced and been removed from NJT list of capital projects.

== See also ==
- Light rail in the United States
- List of United States light rail systems by ridership
- Light rail in North America
