= Palmyra station =

Palmyra
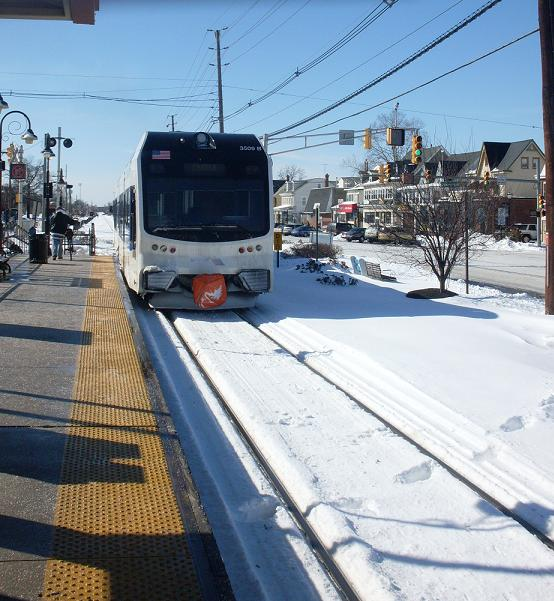
- Northbound train arriving in February 2010

General information
- Location: 10 East Broad Street; Palmyra, New Jersey
- Coordinates: 40°0′15″N 75°1′16″W
- Owner: New Jersey Transit
- Platforms: 1 side platform
- Tracks: 1
- Connections: NJ Transit Bus: 419

Construction
- Parking: 19 spaces, 2 accessible spaces
- Accessible: Yes

Other information
- Fare zone: 1

History
- Opened: March 15, 2004

Services
Preceding station	NJ Transit	Following station
Pennsauken–Route 73 toward Entertainment Center	River Line	Riverton toward Trenton

Former services
Preceding station	Pennsylvania Railroad	Following station
Delair toward Camden	Amboy Branch	Riverton toward South Amboy
Location

Palmyra station is a station on the River Line light rail system, located on East Broad Street between in Cinnaminson and Highland Avenues in Palmyra, New Jersey, though its official address is on East Broad Street.

The station opened on March 15, 2004. Southbound services go to Camden, New Jersey and northbound services go to the Trenton Transit Center. Palmyra station is located just east of Borough Park and the Palmyra Borough Hall.
