= Pennsauken–Route 73 station =

Rail station in New Jersey, US

Pennsauken / Route 73
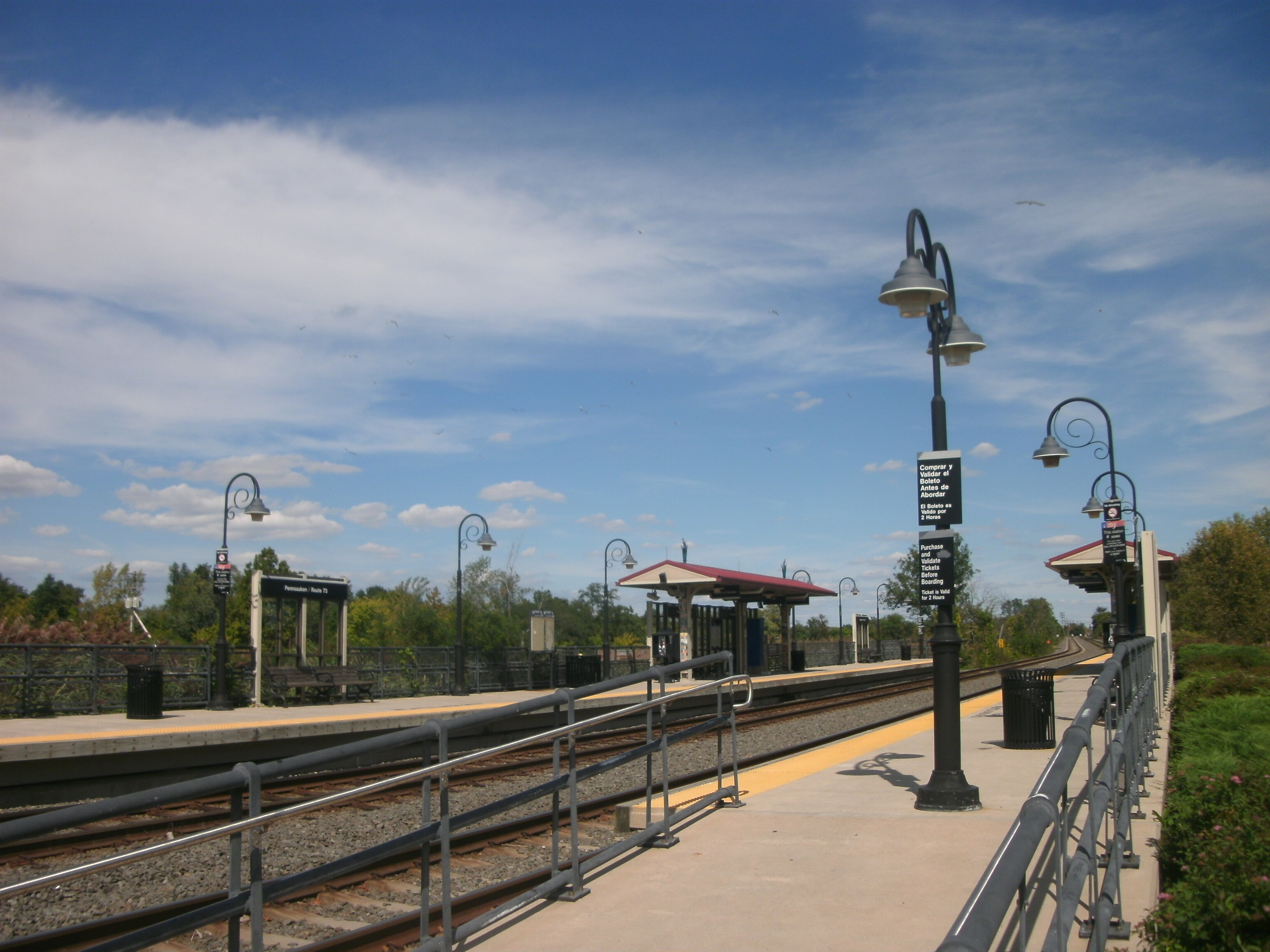
- Pennsauken–Route 73 station in September 2012

General information
- Location: 9501 River Road; Pennsauken, New Jersey
- Coordinates: 39°59′36″N 75°2′21″W
- Owner: New Jersey Transit
- Platforms: 2 side platforms
- Tracks: 2
- Connections: NJ Transit Bus: 419 (on River Road); South Jersey Transportation Authority: Pennsauken/Moorestown Industrial Park Shuttle

Construction
- Parking: 452 spaces, 9 accessible spaces
- Accessible: Yes

Other information
- Fare zone: 1

History
- Opened: March 15, 2004

Services
| Preceding station | NJ Transit | Following station |
|---|---|---|
| Pennsauken toward Entertainment Center | River Line | Palmyra toward Trenton |
Location

Pennsauken–Route 73 station is an active light rail railroad station in the township of Pennsauken in Camden County, New Jersey. Located on River Road south of the eponymous State Route 73, the station serves as a park and ride along NJ Transit's River Line. It is one of two stations in the township, with the Pennsauken Transit Center near the Delair Bridge. The station has a pair of side platforms and a pair of ticket vending machines. Pennsauken–Route 73 station has a park and ride of 461 spaces, free of charge.

The station opened on March 15, 2004 with the opening of the River Line.
