= Cooper Street–Rutgers University station =

Light rail station in New Jersey, USA

Cooper Street / Rutgers
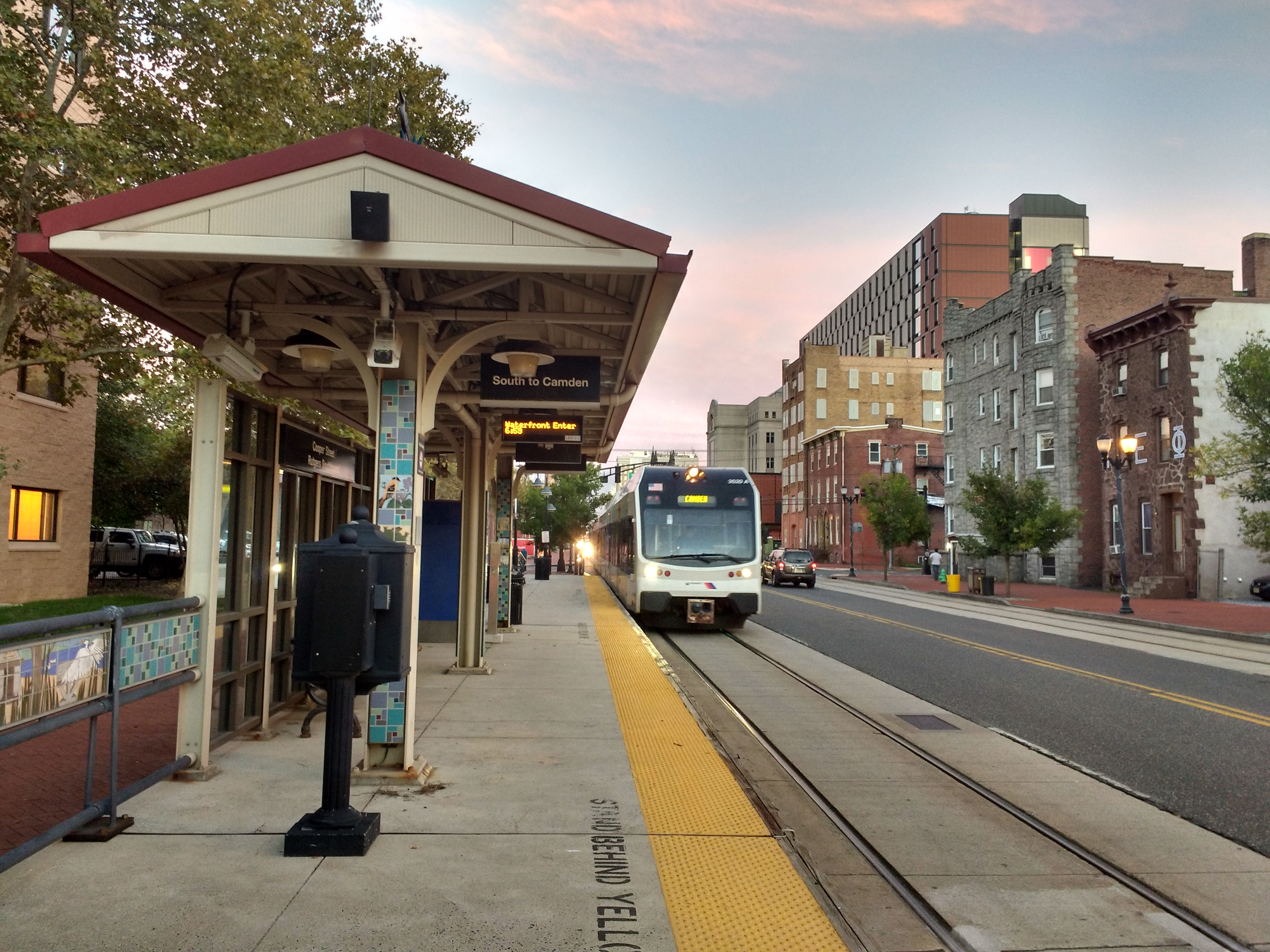
- Southbound train approaching the station

General information
- Location: 209 Cooper Street; Camden, New Jersey, U.S.
- Coordinates: 39°56′52″N 75°7′29″W
- Owner: New Jersey Transit
- Platforms: 2 side platforms (on sidewalk)
- Tracks: 2

Construction
- Accessible: Yes

Other information
- Fare zone: 1

History
- Opened: March 15, 2004

Services
Preceding station	NJ Transit	Following station
Aquarium toward Entertainment Center	River Line	Walter Rand Transportation Center toward Trenton
Location

Cooper Street–Rutgers University station (signed as Cooper Street / Rutgers) is a station on the River Line light rail system, located on Cooper Street in Camden, New Jersey, near the Rutgers–Camden campus. The southbound (westbound) platform is located west of 2nd Street while the northbound (eastbound) platform is east of 2nd Street in the Cooper Grant neighborhood.

The station opened on March 15, 2004. Southbound service from the station is available to the Camden Waterfront. Northbound service is available to the Trenton Rail Station with connections to New Jersey Transit trains to New York City, SEPTA trains to Philadelphia, and Amtrak trains. Access to the PATCO Speedline is available at the Walter Rand Transportation Center.

The Trenton-bound platform is across the street from the Walt Whitman Cultural Arts Center.
