= Freedom Mortgage Pavilion =

Outdoor and indoor theater complex in Camden, New Jersey, United States

- Interactive map of Freedom Mortgage Pavilion
- Former names: Blockbuster-Sony Music Entertainment Centre (1995–2001); Tweeter Center (2001–2008); Susquehanna Bank Center (2008–2015); BB&T Pavilion (2015–2022); Waterfront Music Pavilion (2022)
- Address: 1 Harbour Boulevard; Camden, New Jersey, U.S.
- Location: Camden Waterfront
- Coordinates: 39.940845°N 75.129822°W
- Owner: New Jersey Economic Development Authority
- Operator: Live Nation Entertainment
- Seating type: Pit, reserved, lawn
- Capacity: 25,488 (7,000 indoor)
- Type: Outdoor amphitheatre (summer); Indoor theater (winter)
- Public transit: River Line (at Entertainment Center); PATCO (at Broadway); RiverLink

Construction
- Opened: June 1995

Website
- Official website

The Freedom Mortgage Pavilion is an American outdoor amphitheatre and indoor theater complex in Camden, New Jersey, located in the Camden Waterfront entertainment district on the Delaware River across from Philadelphia.

Since it opened in June 1995, the venue's naming rights have changed several times, and the complex has formerly been known as the Waterfront Music Pavilion, BB&T Pavilion, Susquehanna Bank Center, Tweeter Center, and the Blockbuster-Sony Music Entertainment Centre (the E-Centre).

== History ==
The Freedom Mortgage Pavilion opened in June 1995, with naming rights belonging to Blockbuster and Sony Music Entertainment. On April 1, 2001, the amphitheater was renamed after naming rights were bought by Tweeter. Susquehanna Bank purchased the naming rights in 2008. After Winston-Salem–based BB&T bank bought Susquehanna Bank on August 1, 2015, the amphitheater was renamed BB&T Pavilion. On January 31, 2022, it was announced the venue was officially changing its name a fourth time to the Waterfront Music Pavilion. In May 2022, it was again renamed, as the Freedom Mortgage Pavilion.

== Facility ==
The year-round facility serves as a 25,488-capacity outdoor amphitheater during the summer months, which features a lawn with video screens, computerized sound enhancement, and a clear view of the Philadelphia skyline, Delaware River, and the Benjamin Franklin Bridge to the northwest. In the fall and winter months, the Freedom Mortgage Pavilion converts to a fully enclosed, climate-controlled, flexible-capacity theater for up to 7,000 people offering a variety of concerts, Broadway theatrical productions, and family entertainment. Depending on the event, tickets are available in seat form or standing room.

The Freedom Mortgage Pavilion is adjacent to the Battleship New Jersey Museum and Memorial, Wiggins Park, and the Adventure Aquarium.

== See also ==
- Camden County Music Fair
- Mann Center for the Performing Arts
- New Jersey music venues by capacity
- List of contemporary amphitheatres
