= River Line (NJ Transit) =

Hybrid rail service in southern New Jersey

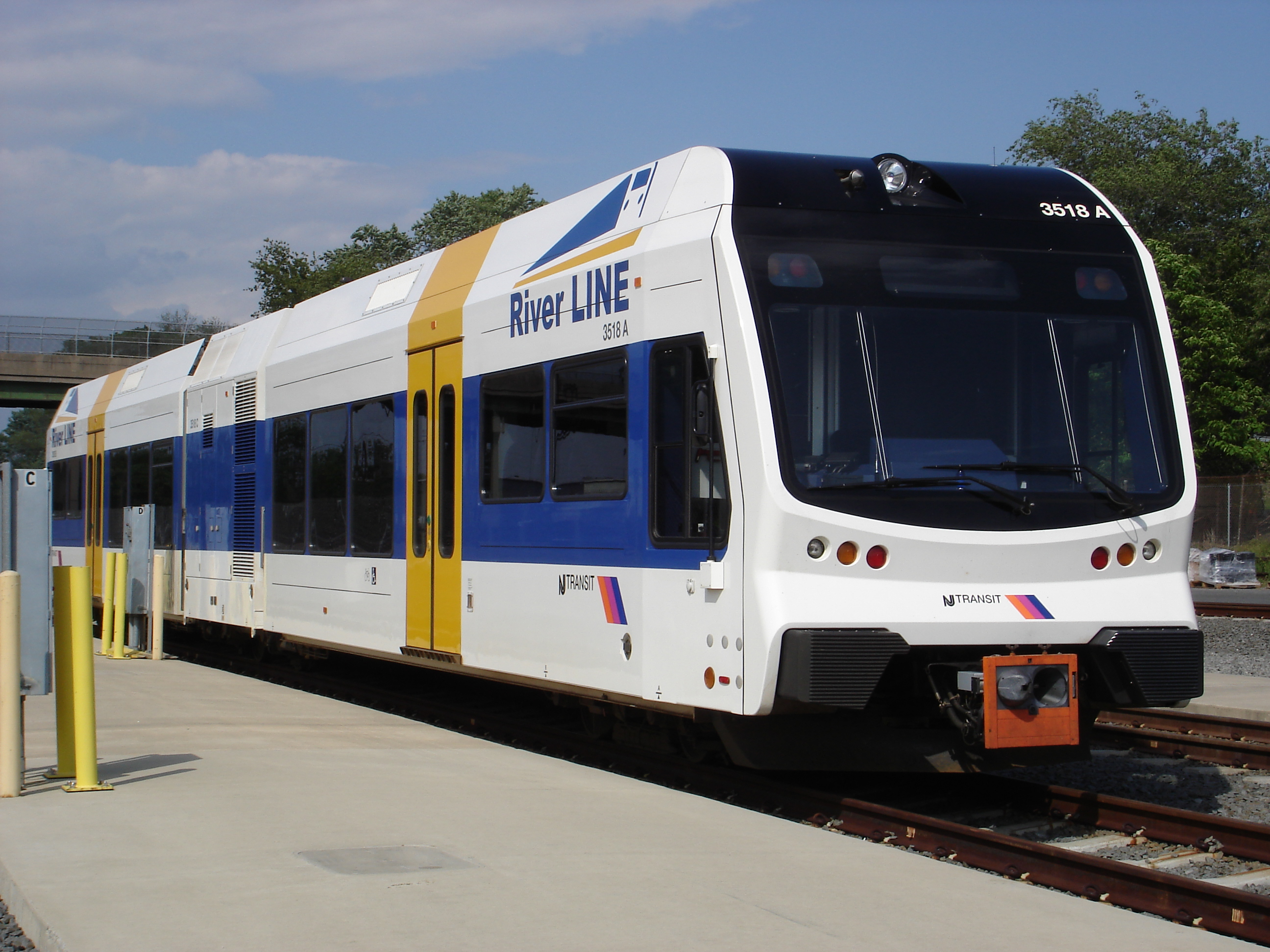
- A River Line train at 36th Street in Pennsauken Township, New Jersey

Overview
- Owner: NJ Transit
- Locale: Camden, Burlington, and Mercer counties, New Jersey
- Termini: Trenton Transit Center; Entertainment Center
- Stations: 21

Service
- Type: Hybrid rail
- System: NJ Transit
- Operator: NJ Transit Southern Light Rail
- Rolling stock: 20 Stadler GTW
- Daily ridership: 8,633 (avg. weekday)
- Ridership: 2,713,160 (FY2017)

History
- Opened: March 14, 2004

Technical
- Line length: 34 mi (55 km)
- Track gauge: 4 ft 8 1/2 in (1,435 mm) standard gauge

The River Line (stylized as River LINE) is a hybrid rail service in southern New Jersey that connects the cities of Camden and Trenton, New Jersey's capital. It is so named because its route between the two cities is parallel to the Delaware River.

The River Line stops at the PATCO Speedline's Broadway station (Walter Rand Transportation Center) and the NJ Transit Atlantic City Line's Pennsauken Transit Center, providing connections to Philadelphia. Its northern terminus is adjacent to the Trenton Transit Center in Trenton.

It was originally operated by the Southern New Jersey Rail Group (SNJRG), which originally included Bechtel and Bombardier Transportation. Once the line was in operation, Bombardier became the sole member of SNJRG. In 2021, Alstom acquired Bombardier Transportation. On September 3, 2025, NJ Transit announced that it would take over operation from Alstom.

== Ridership ==
The River Line was exceeding final ridership estimates of 5,500 passengers per day, with an average of 9,014 weekday, 5,922 Saturday, and 4,708 Sunday average passenger trips as of the end of fiscal year 2014. During this time, there were 2,869,707 unlinked passenger trips.

In 2022 after the COVID-19 pandemic ridership was at 5,350 boardings per weekday, around 61% of pre-pandemic levels.

== History ==
=== Alignment ===
The River Line was constructed on what originally was the Camden-Bordentown section and the Bordentown Branch of the Camden and Amboy Railroad (C&A). The lines ran under the C&A name between 1830 and 1871, when the line was absorbed into the Pennsylvania Railroad. Ownership proceeded under Penn Central after 1968, and Conrail from 1976 to June 1, 1999, but the original passenger service had been abandoned in 1963.

=== Planning ===
The path to NJ Transit's River Line spanned at least three decades and over multiple planning agencies. An unrelated precursor to the NJ Transit River Line was the Delaware River Port Authority's 1960 plan for rail rapid transit service to Moorestown/Mount Holly, Lindenwold, and Woodbury Heights/Glassboro, using three existing railroad corridors. Implementation of the complete plan was considered unrealistically expensive. The DRPA elected to focus its resources on the most promising corridor, the Philadelphia–Lindenwold route. Construction on the PATCO Speedline began in 1966 and was completed in 1969, re-using the 1936 Bridge Line subway and constructing a grade-separated heavy-rail line within the Atlantic City Line right-of-way. The DRPA's original proposal did not include the alignment that became the River Line corridor, but planned to serve Burlington County via the Mount Holly alignment.

NJ Transit's planning for the Burlington–Gloucester Transit System began in the early 1990s.

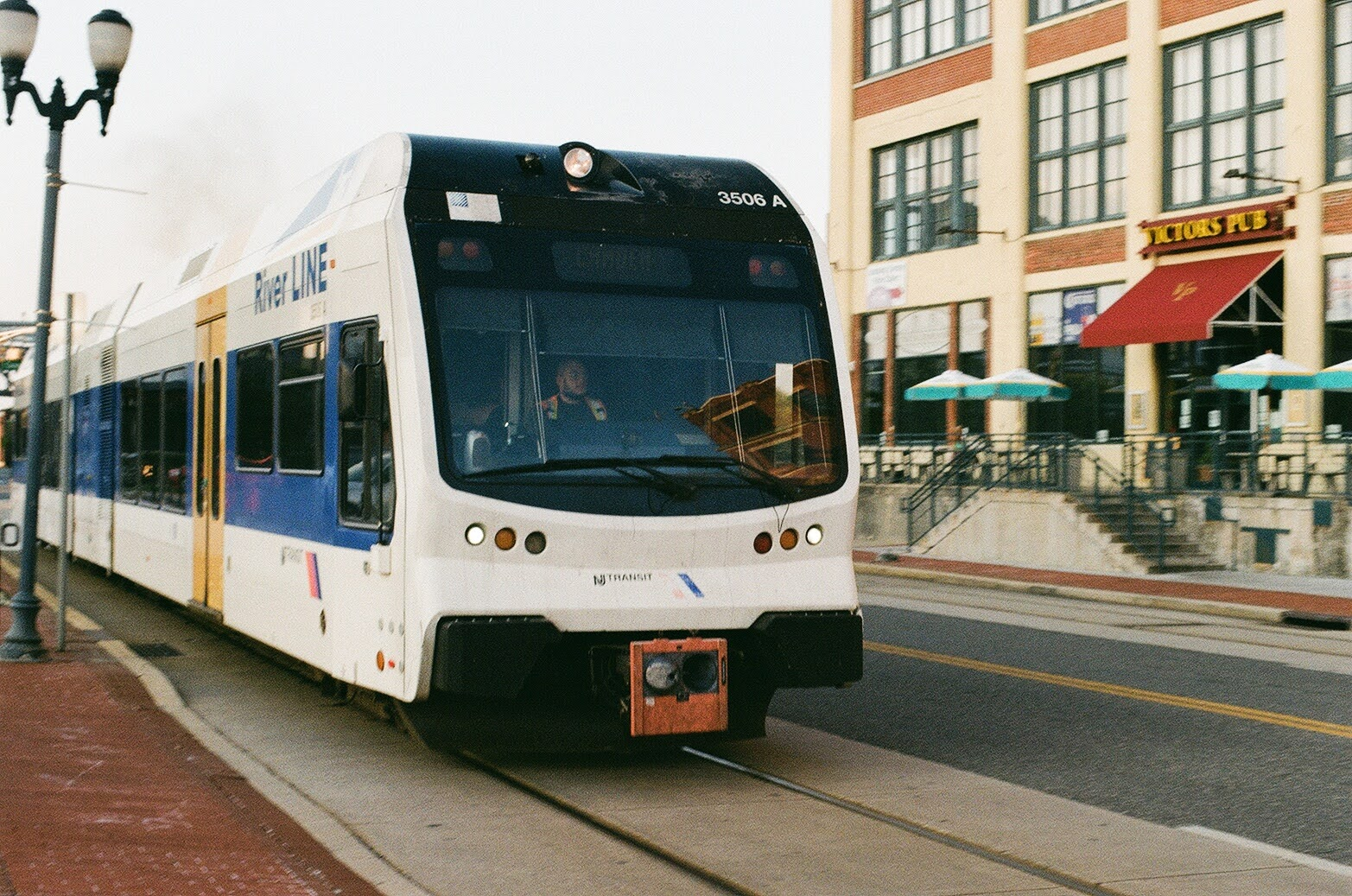
The NJ Transit River Line in downtown Camden, NJ

The primary goals of the BGTS were:

- Connecting South Jersey communities to Philadelphia
- Providing streetcar service to downtown Camden
- Providing regional rail transit service to Burlington and Gloucester Counties

A Major Investment Study (MIS) published in 1996 concluded that a Gloucester route was more suitable than a Burlington route based on travel demand and citizen support. This study included substantial public participation: fourteen open houses, three advisory committees, and other public outreach. The process found substantial neighborhood opposition to the Mount Holly alignment through Burlington County: county freeholders publicly opposed the possibility. Opposition was particularly strong in Moorestown Township, partly because of a potential street-running section. Meanwhile, Gloucester County leaders were largely ambivalent towards the project.

Dissatisfied with this analysis, Senator C. William Haines introduced legislation in the New Jersey State Senate requiring NJ Transit to study rail transit service along the Delaware River between Trenton, Camden, and Glassboro. Haines, a native of Moorestown, sought the benefits of rail for Burlington County without the disruption to his hometown.

Two special studies were commissioned to supplement the alternatives identified in the MIS. The second of these special studies examined the Bordentown Secondary, another Conrail corridor through Burlington County, the alignment of today’s River Line. The parallel NJ Transit local bus on U.S. Route 130 was heavily patronized, and the corridor was ripe for economic development.

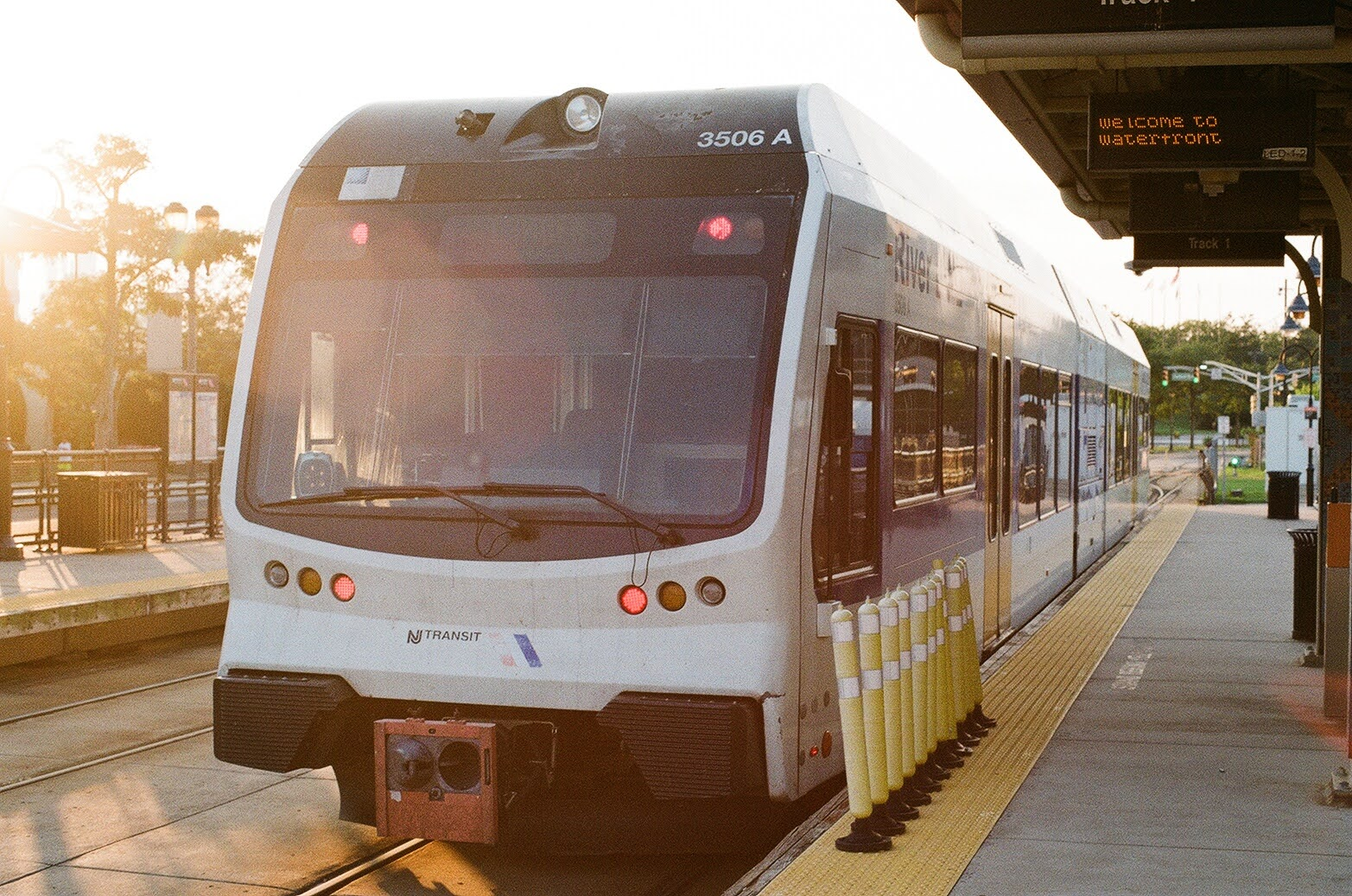
The NJ Transit River Line at Aquarium Station in Camden, NJ

In November 1996, NJ Transit's board of directors approved a light rail transit alignment from Glassboro to Trenton with diesel-powered cars based on the findings of the special study. The board also established the initial operating corridor (IOC) to be the Trenton-Camden corridor. The draft environmental impact statement (DEIS) was completed in 1998, and the contract with SNJRG was finalized in 1999, permitting the system to open to the public on March 14, 2004. The entire line was 100 percent funded by the State of New Jersey from its Transportation Trust Fund. No federal capital was expended for this diesel light rail project. Former NJ Transit executive director George Warrington has described the River Line as "the poster child for how not to plan and make decisions about a transit investment."

=== Pennsauken Transit Center ===
The lack of a direct transfer between the River Line and NJ Transit's Atlantic City Line, which crosses directly over the River Line in Pennsauken, was highly criticized at the time of the River Line's opening. NJT subsequently reconsidered; in March 2009, NJT announced that an intermodal station linking the River Line and the Atlantic City Line would be constructed in Pennsauken. The new intermodal station would include one low-level platform for River Line trains, two high-level platforms for Atlantic City Line commuter trains, and 280 parking spaces. A ground breaking ceremony was held for the Pennsauken Transit Center on October 19, 2009. The second and final phase of construction was approved by the NJ Transit Board of Directors on July 13, 2011. NJ Transit opened the station to passenger service on October 14, 2013.

=== NJ Transit takeover ===
On September 3, 2025, NJ Transit announced it would take over the line from Alstom. The takeover came following several years of equipment issues and reports of delays. The full takeover by NJ Transit was completed by February 14, 2026.

== Ownership and time sharing agreement ==
Except at each end of the line, the River Line was Conrail's Bordentown Secondary until June 1, 1999, when NJ Transit bought it for $67.5 million. NJ Transit has exclusive access to run light rail passenger service on the line from 05:30 to 22:10 Sunday through Friday, and all of Saturday night and Sunday morning. Conrail has exclusive access for freight at other times. Either agency may request to use the line at abnormal times in case of a special event or emergency.

Within a year of the River Line's launch, the Federal Railroad Administration (FRA) granted permission to adjust timesharing agreement (more technically, "temporal separation") terms. NJ Transit and Conrail agreed to divide the line into two segments, from Camden to Bordentown (south), and Bordentown to Trenton (north). In the northern section, the passenger period starts at 5:45 a.m. instead of 6 a.m. Initially, these new periods allowed NJ Transit to deadhead equipment from Trenton to Bordentown and Florence at 5.45 a.m., to form the 6:08 a.m. and 6:23 a.m. northbound departures. These early morning trains provide earlier connections at Trenton for NJ Transit's Northeast Corridor services to Newark and New York City than were available previously.

=== Service improvements and cutbacks ===
NJ Transit has made some service improvements within the constraints of the timesharing agreement, with the construction of a mid-line yard in 2005 to permit later Burlington arrivals in the evening, and earlier departures after 6 a.m. However, most of the changes noted to facilitate late night service (after 10 p.m. on nights other than Saturdays) have been reversed, as listed. Since the River Line opened, NJ Transit has made the service enhancements listed below (some of them subsequently reversed):

- Introduced 15-minute peak-period service in June 2004
- Enhanced Capital Connection bus service in Trenton to provide better connections for state workers with River Line trains in June 2004
- Launched new early morning service to Trenton from Florence and Roebling in September 2004, enabling customers to make earlier connections to Northeast Corridor trains
- Launched new early service from Cinnaminson to Camden in January 2005
- Launched late-night bus shuttle service between 36th Street Station in Pennsauken to Route 73/Pennsauken in 2006. This no longer operates as of 2010, although the bus route 419 does serve both locations.
- Added early-morning trips from Burlington South and Burlington Towne Centre stations in September 2006 to create additional Northeast Corridor and PATCO connections
- Added a later, 9:28 p.m. Trenton departure in September 2006 on weekdays (9:30 p.m. on Sundays) as far as Burlington South Station.
- Added late-night, seven days a week service from Camden to Pennsauken, with the last train leaving Entertainment Center Station at 12:00 a.m. This option was discontinued in 2010, although the bus route 419 does serve stations between the Walter Rand Transportation Center and Pennsauken/Route 73 as well as several other stations as far north as Riverside. The last train from Camden leaves the Walter Rand Transportation at 9:38 p.m. and arrives at Pennsauken/Route 73 at 9:47 p.m. Some late night service continues to run, on Saturdays, and, on irregular occasions, for special events on the Camden Waterfront or at the Entertainment Center in Camden.
- Added early-morning trains for both weekdays and weekends, including a special limited-stop weekday train leaving at 5:53 a.m. from Walter Rand Transportation Center and arriving at Trenton at 6:42 a.m. (normal runs take 58 minutes, compared to the 49 minutes for the limited-stop train), allowing commuters ample time to transfer to a 6:50 scheduled New York City-bound express train.

There is no northbound late night service except on Saturdays due to budget cuts; the last northbound train leaves the Walter Rand Transportation Center at 9:38 p.m. Sundays through Fridays and goes only as far as the Pennsauken/Route 73 station. The only option to reach some stations north of the Walter Rand Transportation Center from Camden on these nights is the Route 419 bus, which stops at each station as far north as Riverside while the Atlantic City Rail Line from Philadelphia and Lindenwold connects with the River Line at the Pennsauken Transit Center Station.

=== Discontinuation of late night service ===
Currently, there is no service on the line after 10 p.m., except on Saturdays and limited nights when there is a concert at the Entertainment Center at the southern end of the line or another special event. Two stations in Camden, which are double-tracked where the final southbound trains stop just after 10 p.m., are the only exception. This reduction in service occurred in 2010 to save money.

== Operations and signalling ==
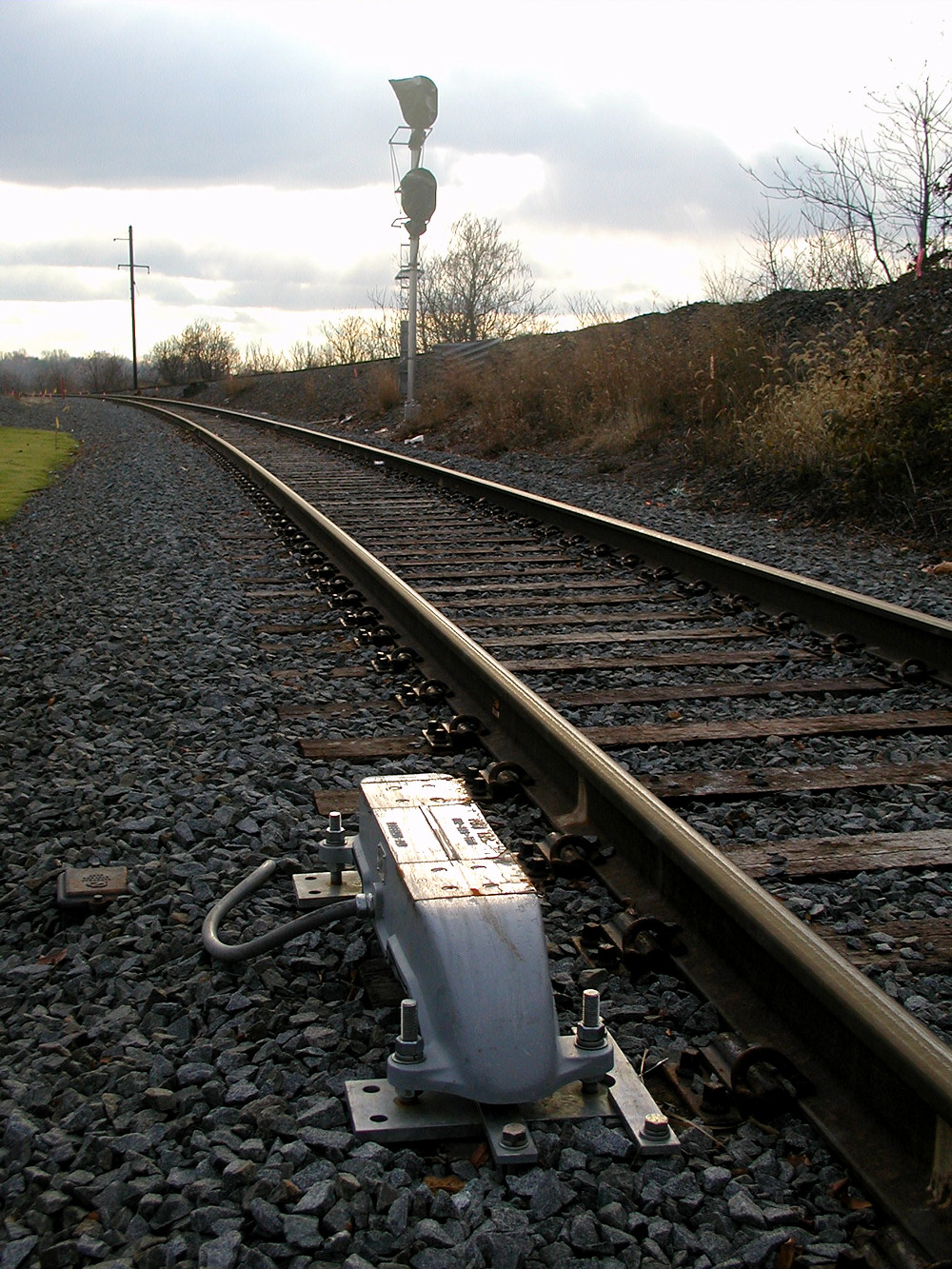
River Line inductive train stop located in front of the absolute signal at CP-HATCH

Most of the length of the project, except for street-running portion at the Camden end, is shared between non-FRA compliant lightweight DMUs and heavy mainline freight trains. The 34-mile shared-track segment contains a mixture of single and double track sections.

The River Line was initially designed for commingled operations (i.e., where freight trains and light rail trains may operate on the same line controlled only by the signal systems) to provide maximum flexibility both for the freight and transit operators. The line, rebuilt under a design-build-operate-maintain (DBOM) contract, features mainline railroad signals with full centralized traffic control (CTC). River Line operating personnel use a modified version of the NORAC Rules, a standard set of railroad operating rules used by mainline railroads operating in the Northeastern U.S., including Amtrak and Conrail.

Signals set to stop for the diesel light rail cars are positively enforced via Intermittent Inductive Automatic Train Stop. The system is similar (but not identical) to the German Indusi system, where signal aspects are transmitted to moving trains from wayside devices. The inductive train stop devices are placed by the running rails in advance of the absolute signals. Train's emergency brakes are automatically engaged if a stop signal overrun occurs and interlockings are designed with sufficient overlap for trains to come to a complete stop before conflicting with other traffic.

== Payment and ticketing ==
The River Line is equivalent to a one-zone bus ride: fares cost $1.80. The River Line operates on a proof-of-payment system, as is typical of most light rail systems throughout the United States. Passengers can buy tickets at ticket vending machines (TVMs) present at all stations or via the NJ Transit App on Smartphones. Through-ticketing is available for connecting bus routes to Philadelphia. One-way, round-trip, and ten-trip tickets must then be validated, either by the app or with paper tickets, through automated validators located near the TVMs, which stamp the date and time on the ticket for 75 minutes of use. NJ Transit's fare inspectors randomly check tickets on trains and at stations; fare evasion carries a fine of up to $100. Unused Newark City Subway and Hudson-Bergen Light Rail tickets can be used after validation at a River Line station. As of 2004, rider fares only covered 7% of costs (not including debt service). Like the rest of NJ Transit's other transportation modes, it does not accept the SEPTA Key Card, PATCO's Freedom Card, MTA's MetroCard, or OMNY, although it has plans to create a new fare payment system in the future.

== Rolling stock ==
The River Line fleet comprises 20 articulated Swiss-built Stadler GTW 2/6 DMU (diesel multiple unit) cars. The River Line is the first light rail system in the United States to use these instead of more typical electric vehicles.

== Stations ==
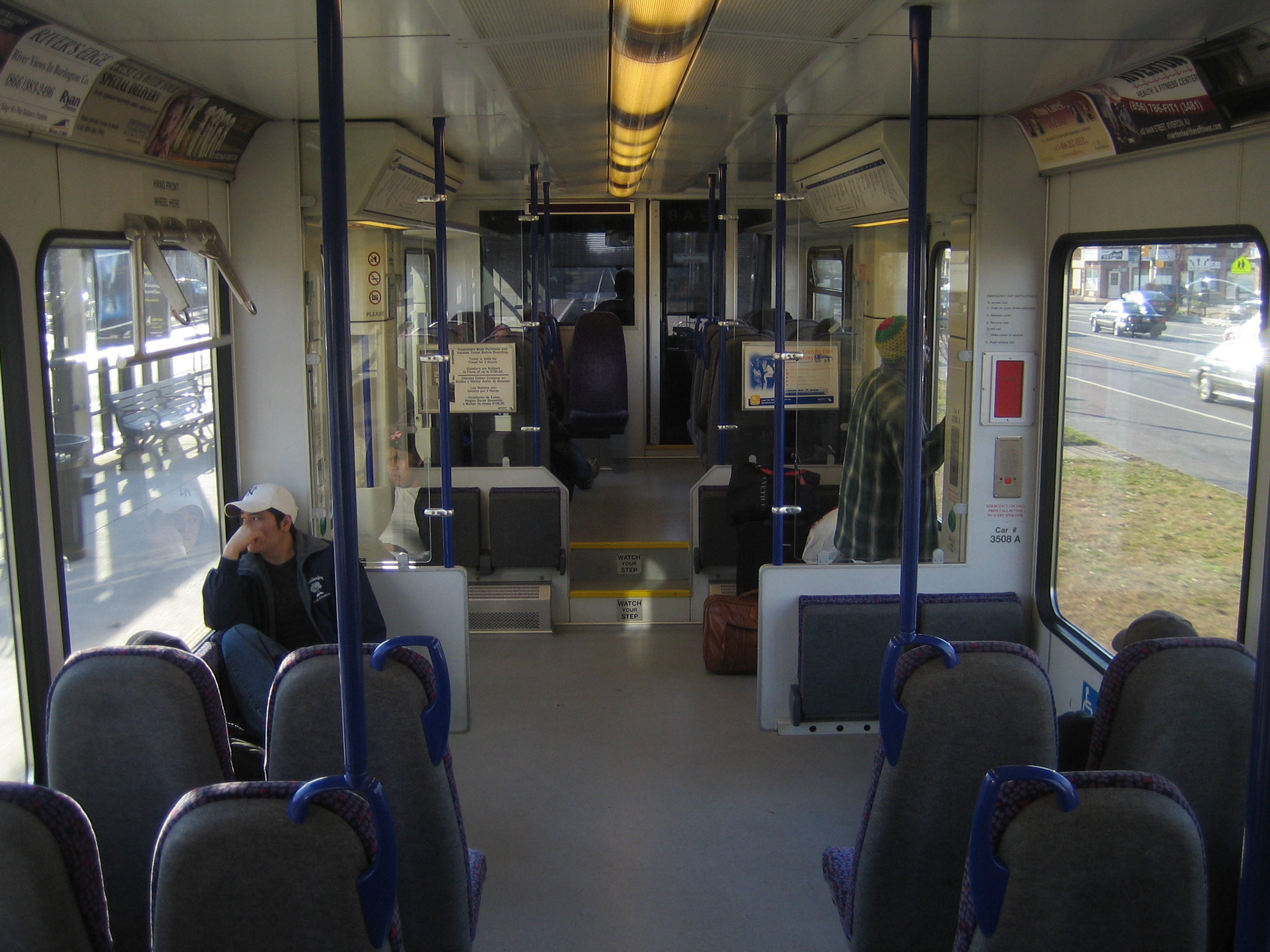
The interior of a southbound River Line train

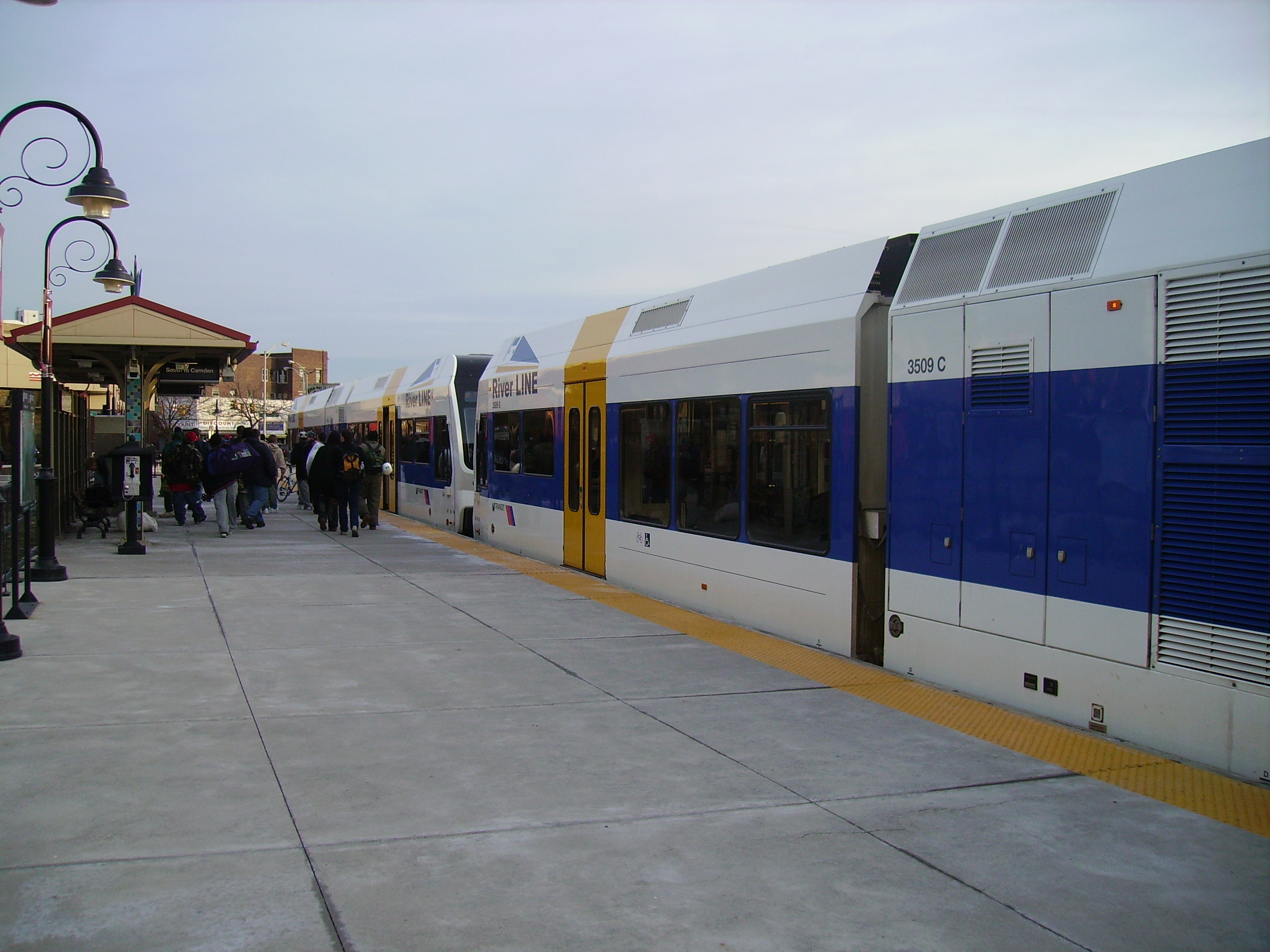
A River Line train stopped at Walter Rand Transportation Center

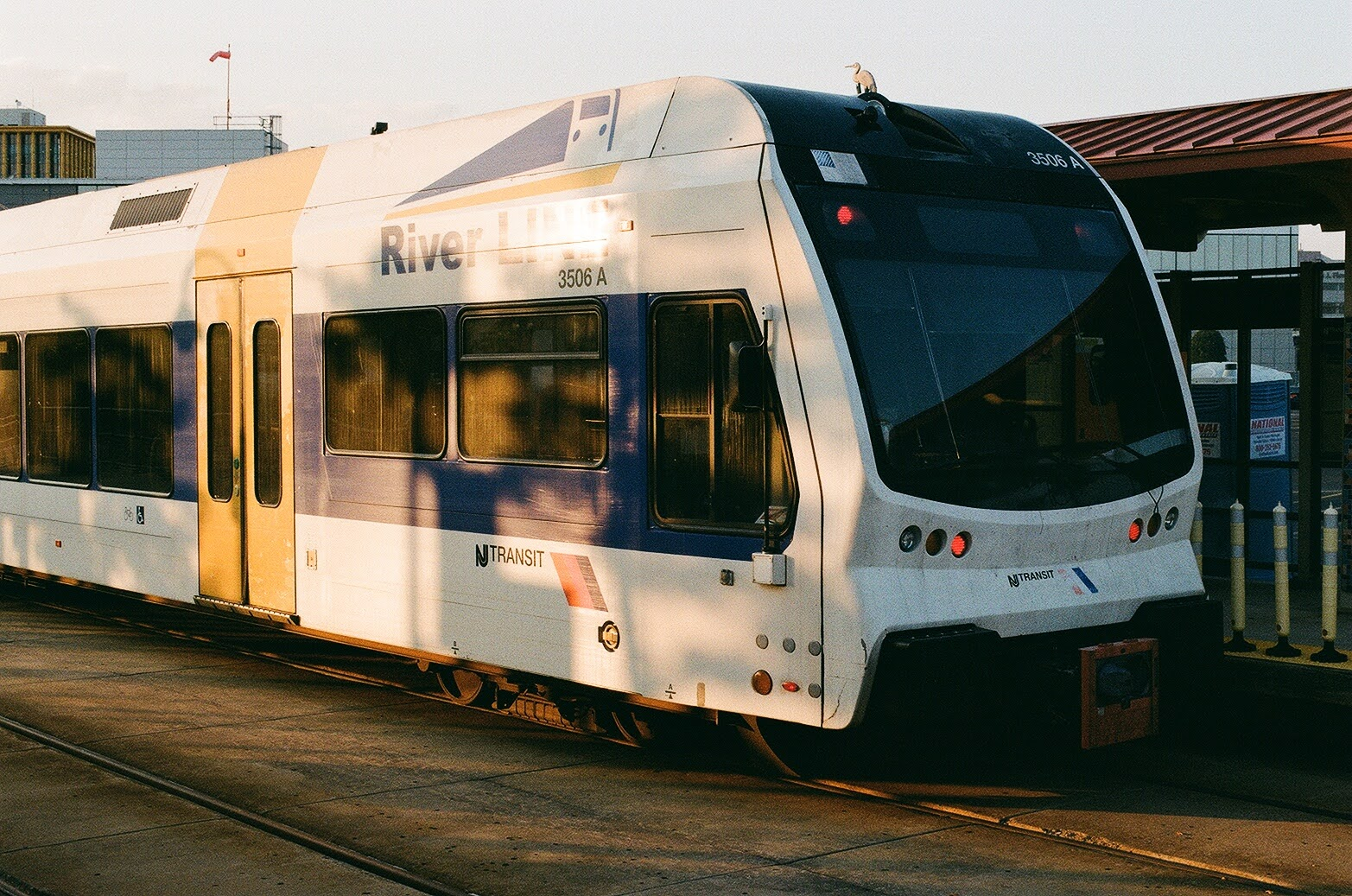
NJ Transit River Line at Entertainment Center station in Camden, NJ

All stations and rolling stock were built after 1990 and are fully ADA-compliant.

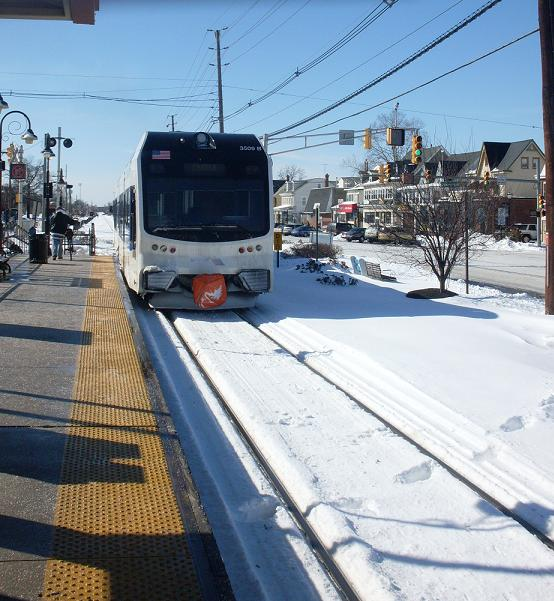
A northbound River Line train arrives at Palmyra Station after a snowstorm in February 2010

Location	Station	Connections	Boardings per Weekday (2024)	Notes
Trenton	Trenton	Amtrak: Northeast Corridor services NJ Transit: NEC Northeast Corridor Line; SEPTA Regional Rail: NJ Transit Bus: 409, 418, 600, 601, 608, 609, 611, 624; SEPTA Suburban Bus: 127	1,042	Northern terminus, located just west of rail station
Trenton	Hamilton Avenue	NJ Transit Bus: 409, 601, 603, 609	166	Serves CURE Insurance Arena
Trenton	Cass Street		261	Serves Trenton Thunder Ballpark
Bordentown	Bordentown	NJ Transit Bus: 409	159	
Florence Township	Roebling	NJ Transit Bus: 409	127	
Florence Township	Florence	BurLink: B5; NJ Transit Bus: 409, 413	326	Park and ride
Burlington	Burlington Towne Centre	NJ Transit Bus: 409, 413	457	
Burlington	Burlington South		158	Park and ride
Beverly	Beverly/Edgewater Park	BurLink: B1, B2	315	
Delanco Township	Delanco		119	
Riverside	Riverside	NJ Transit Bus: 419	334	
Cinnaminson Township	Cinnaminson	NJ Transit Bus: 419	164	
Riverton	Riverton	NJ Transit Bus: 419	72	
Palmyra	Palmyra	NJ Transit Bus: 419	296	
Pennsauken Township	Pennsauken–Route 73	NJ Transit Bus: 419; SJTA Bus: TransIT Link	84	Park and ride
Pennsauken Township	Pennsauken Transit Center	NJ Transit: ACL Atlantic City Line; NJ Transit Bus: 404, 417, 419	NO DATA	
Pennsauken Township	36th Street	NJ Transit Bus: 452	200	
Camden	Walter Rand Transportation Center	PATCO Lindenwold Line (at Broadway); NJ Transit Bus: 313, 315, 316, 317, 400, 401, 402, 403, 404, 405, 406, 407, 408, 409, 410, 412, 413, 418, 419, 450, 451, 452, 453, 457, 551; SJTA Bus: Pureland Shuttle; Greyhound Lines	1,043	
Camden	Cooper Street–Rutgers University		145	
Camden	Aquarium	NJ Transit Bus: 452, 453	53	Serves Adventure Aquarium
Camden	Entertainment Center		52	Southern terminus, serves Freedom Mortgage Pavilion

== Future service, stations and extensions ==
New Jersey Transit has proposed several possible extensions and stations to the River Line, either as parts of the initial construction plan which were deferred, or as potential future projects.

=== Glassboro–Camden Line ===
The Glassboro–Camden Line is a proposed 18-mile (28.97 km) diesel multiple unit (DMU) hybrid rail system. At its northern end in Camden it will converge with the River Line, with which its infrastructure and vehicles will be compatible, and terminate at the Walter Rand Transportation Center. The plan is part of larger expansion of public transportation in South Jersey that will include bus rapid transit along the Route 42 and Route 55, improvements to the Atlantic City Rail Line, and enhanced connections to the Atlantic City International Airport.

=== New Jersey State House extension ===
The New Jersey State House is located approximately 0.8 miles to the northwest of the River Line's northern terminal at Trenton Transit Center. While the line was being constructed, NJT studied an extension that would bridge this gap via a shared right-of-way on city streets. Such an extension would provide direct service to the workplaces of state employees and other workers in downtown Trenton. While the project is supported by City of Trenton officials, NJT did not elect to expand the already over-budget construction effort, but instead operates a branded "Capitol Connection" bus service, requiring River Line riders to transfer at Trenton Transit Center.

=== West Trenton extension ===
A third proposed extension would take the River Line beyond the State House through Trenton, to West Trenton station in Ewing Township, New Jersey, connecting with SEPTA's West Trenton Line service to Center City Philadelphia via Bucks and Montgomery counties. NJ Transit listed this extension on its 2020 Transit wish list map, but has not taken further action.

=== Additional double-track service ===
Much of the River Line uses double track, however, in some places, there is no room for double-track service without narrowing or removing road lanes, such as Burlington (where streets flank the single track on either side), Palmyra and Bordentown. Improving headways from the current peak level of 15 minutes would require either building additional passing sidings or removing one lane of traffic on certain local roads.

== See also ==
- Hudson–Bergen Light Rail
- Newark Light Rail
- Light rail in the United States
- List of tram and light rail transit systems
