= 36th Street station (River Line) =

Light rail station in New Jersey, USA

36th Street
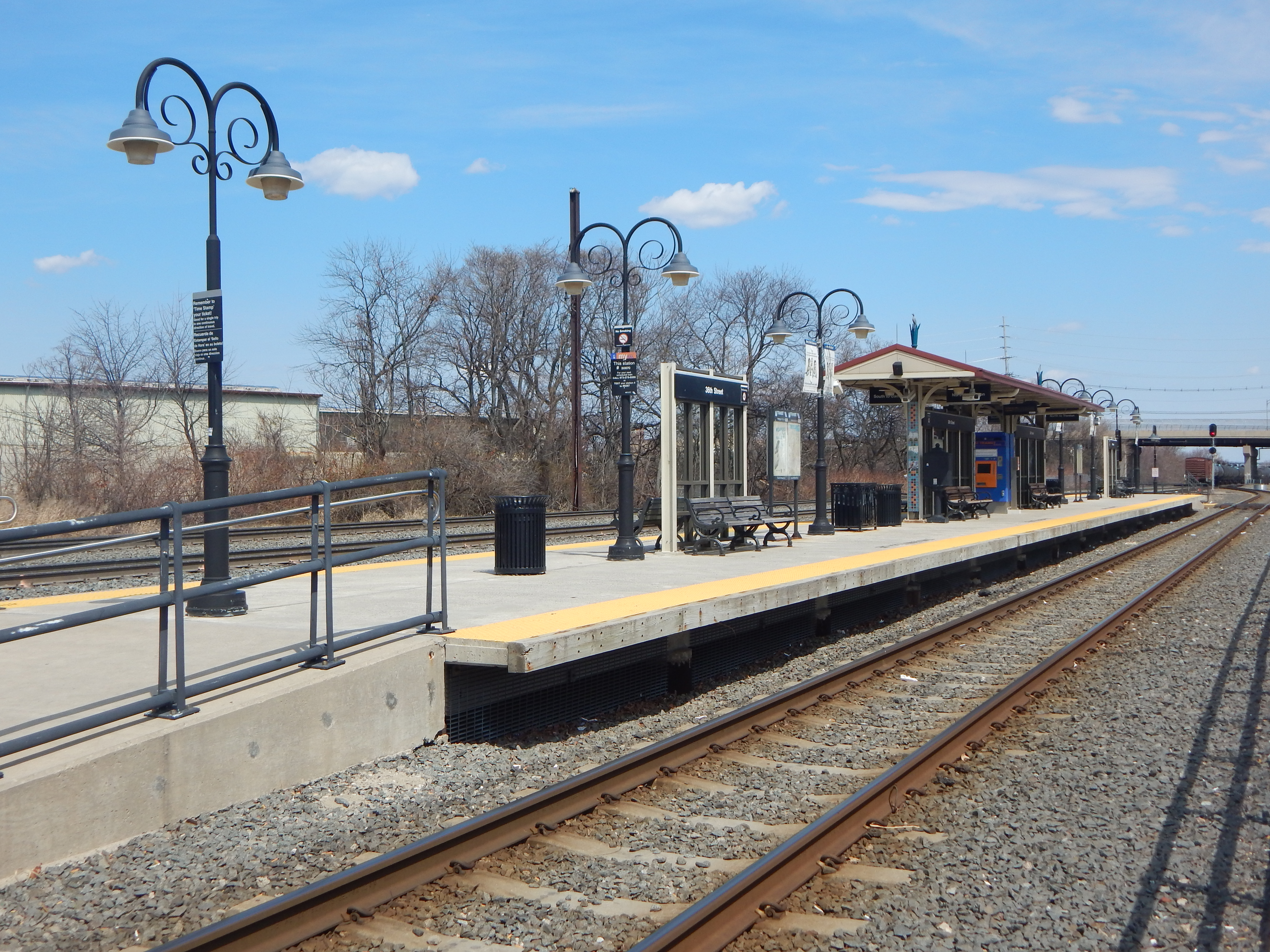
- The 36th Street station in April 2015.

General information
- Location: 1500 36th Street; Pennsauken Township, New Jersey
- Coordinates: 39°57′41″N 75°4′45″W
- Owner: New Jersey Transit
- Platforms: 1 island platform
- Tracks: 2
- Connections: NJ Transit Bus: 452

Construction
- Parking: 367 spaces, 8 accessible spaces
- Accessible: Yes

Other information
- Fare zone: 1

History
- Opened: March 15, 2004

Services
Preceding station	NJ Transit	Following station
Walter Rand Transportation Center toward Entertainment Center	River Line	Pennsauken toward Trenton
Location

36th Street station is an NJ Transit station on the River Line light rail system, located off 36th Street and River Road in the Delaware Gardens neighborhood of Pennsauken Township, in Camden County, New Jersey, United States. It is situated north of Pavonia Yard at the city line with Camden, and as such is the southernmost station of three along the River Line within Pennsauken.

The station opened on March 15, 2004. Southbound service from the station is available to the Walter Rand Transportation Center, with transfer available to the PATCO Speedline, and the Camden Waterfront. Northbound service is available to the Pennsauken Transit Center with connection to Atlantic City via the Atlantic City Line and Trenton Transit Center with connections to New Jersey Transit trains to Newark Penn Station, New York Penn Station, SEPTA trains to Philadelphia, and Amtrak trains.
