= RiverLink Ferry =

Passenger ferry that crosses the Delaware River

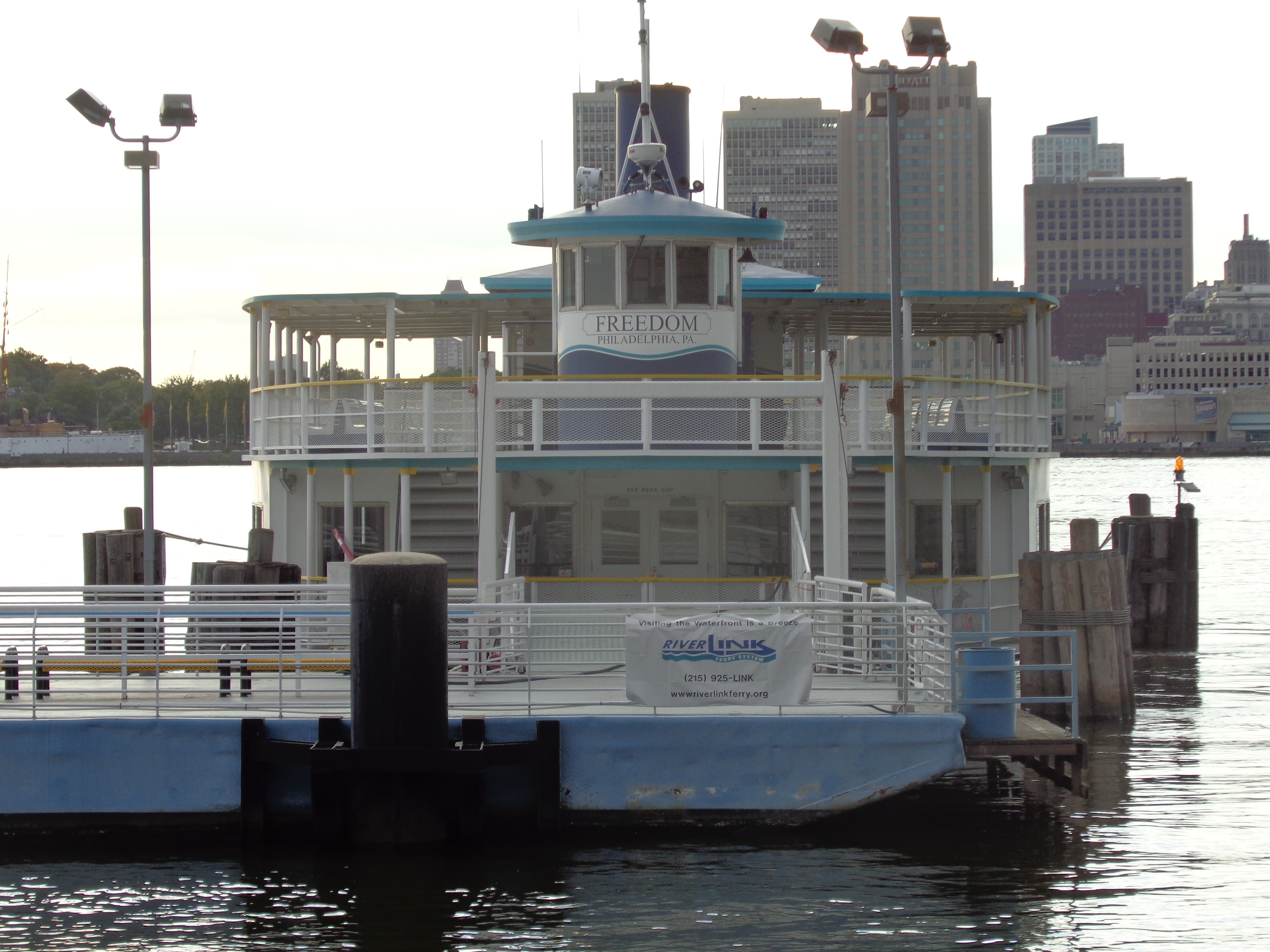
- The RiverLink Ferry Freedom at the Camden Waterfront
- Locale: Philadelphia, Pennsylvania and Camden, New Jersey
- Waterway: Delaware River
- Transit type: Passenger ferry
- Operator: Delaware River Waterfront Corporation
- Began operation: March 1992
- No. of vessels: 2
- No. of terminals: 2

The RiverLink Ferry is a passenger ferry service in the United States. The ferry crosses the Delaware River, connecting the Camden Waterfront, in Camden, New Jersey, with Penn's Landing, in Philadelphia, Pennsylvania. The ferry operates daily from May through September, and on Fridays through Sundays in April and October. Primarily, the system provides tourists with a means to reach waterfront attractions. The service carries over 200,000 passengers per year and first turned a profit in 2006.

== History ==
The ferry service initiated operations on March 31, 1992, exactly 40 years to the day that the Pennsylvania ferry service between Camden and Philadelphia ended March 31, 1952. The ferry operated as the Riverbus ferry from March 1992 through December 1996 under contract with the Coopers Ferry Development Corporation and Riverbus Incorporated out of Pensacola, Florida. In January 1997, the Penn's landing Corporation acquired the vessel and renamed it the Riverlink with the service managed by McGovern Marine Corp. In January 2000, the Delaware River Port Authority purchased the vessel from Penn's landing Corporation with the operational service to be continued by McGovern Marine Corp. Between 1997 and 2004, the annual ridership averaged 319,000 passengers with a one-day record of 15,852 passengers for Opsail 2000.

Between April 1, 2000, and 2015 the service was operated by the Delaware River Port Authority (DRPA). The DRPA originally agreed to take over its operation in November 1999. Service is provided by Freedom Ferry, a 600-passenger vessel managed by Hornblower Marine Services. On June 3, 2005, Hornblower also began offering Delaware River ferry tours under the name "Harbor Tours."

In 2000, the United States Department of Transportation, Federal Highway Administration provided a grant of $1,306,500 for the purchase and conversion of a second vessel. This vessel, which became the Freedom Ferry, began operating in 2003 and eventually replaced the original vessel.

On October 31, 2005, the DRPA announced it had received federal funding of $7.3 million for improvements to the ferry's dock in Philadelphia, comprising $3.3 million up front plus $1 million a year for four years.

In 2015, DRPA sold the RiverLink Ferry to the Delaware River Waterfront Corporation and the Cooper's Ferry Partnership.

== See also ==
- List of crossings of the Delaware River
