= Walter Rand Transportation Center =

Passenger transportation hub in Camden, New Jersey, USA

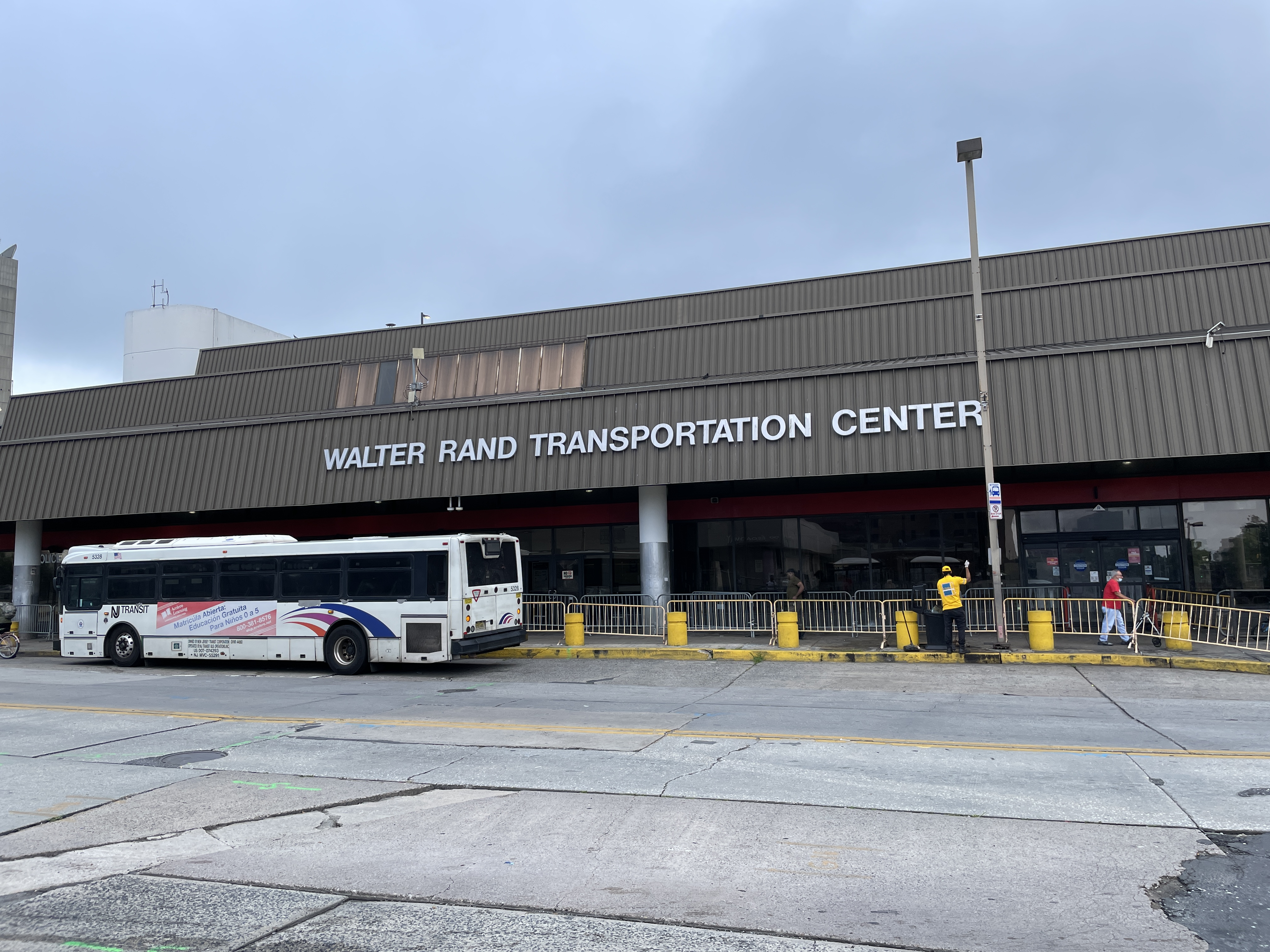
- Walter Rand Transportation Center entrance from Broadway

General information
- Other names: Broadway
- Location: 527 Martin Luther King Boulevard; Camden, New Jersey, U.S.
- Coordinates: 39°56′35″N 75°7′11″W
- Owner: NJ Transit and Delaware River Port Authority
- Platforms: 2 side platforms (River Line); 1 island platform (PATCO)
- Tracks: 2 (River Line); 2 (PATCO)
- Bus routes: NJ Transit Bus: 313, 315, 316, 317, 400, 401, 402, 403, 404, 405, 406, 407, 408, 409, 410, 412, 413, 418, 419, 450, 451, 452, 453, 457, 551; Greyhound Lines
- Connections: SJTA: Pureland North South

Construction
- Parking: Paid parking nearby
- Cycle facilities: Racks
- Accessible: yes

History
- Opened: October 8, 1908
- Rebuilt: June 7, 1936 (Bridge Line); January 4, 1969 (PATCO conversion); May 17, 1989 (bus center opened); March 15, 2004 (River Line opened)

Services
Preceding station	NJ Transit	Following station
Cooper Street–Rutgers University toward Entertainment Center	River Line	36th Street toward Trenton
Preceding station	DRPA	Following station
City Hall toward 15–16th & Locust	PATCO Speedline	Ferry Avenue toward Lindenwold
Proposed services (2028)
Preceding station	NJ Transit	Following station
Terminus	Glassboro–Camden Line	Lanning Square toward Glassboro
Former services (at Broadway)
Preceding station	Pennsylvania-Reading Seashore Lines	Following station
Camden Closed 1953 Terminus	ACRR Main Line	Collingswood toward Atlantic City
Camden Closed 1953 Terminus	ACRR Cape May Branch	51st Street toward Cape May
Preceding station	Pennsylvania Railroad	Following station
Camden Terminus	Amboy Branch	Pavonia toward South Amboy
Location

The Walter Rand Transportation Center is a transportation hub located at Martin Luther King Boulevard and Broadway in Camden, New Jersey. It is served by the River Line, New Jersey Transit buses and Greyhound intercity buses and also includes the Broadway station of the PATCO Speedline.

== History ==
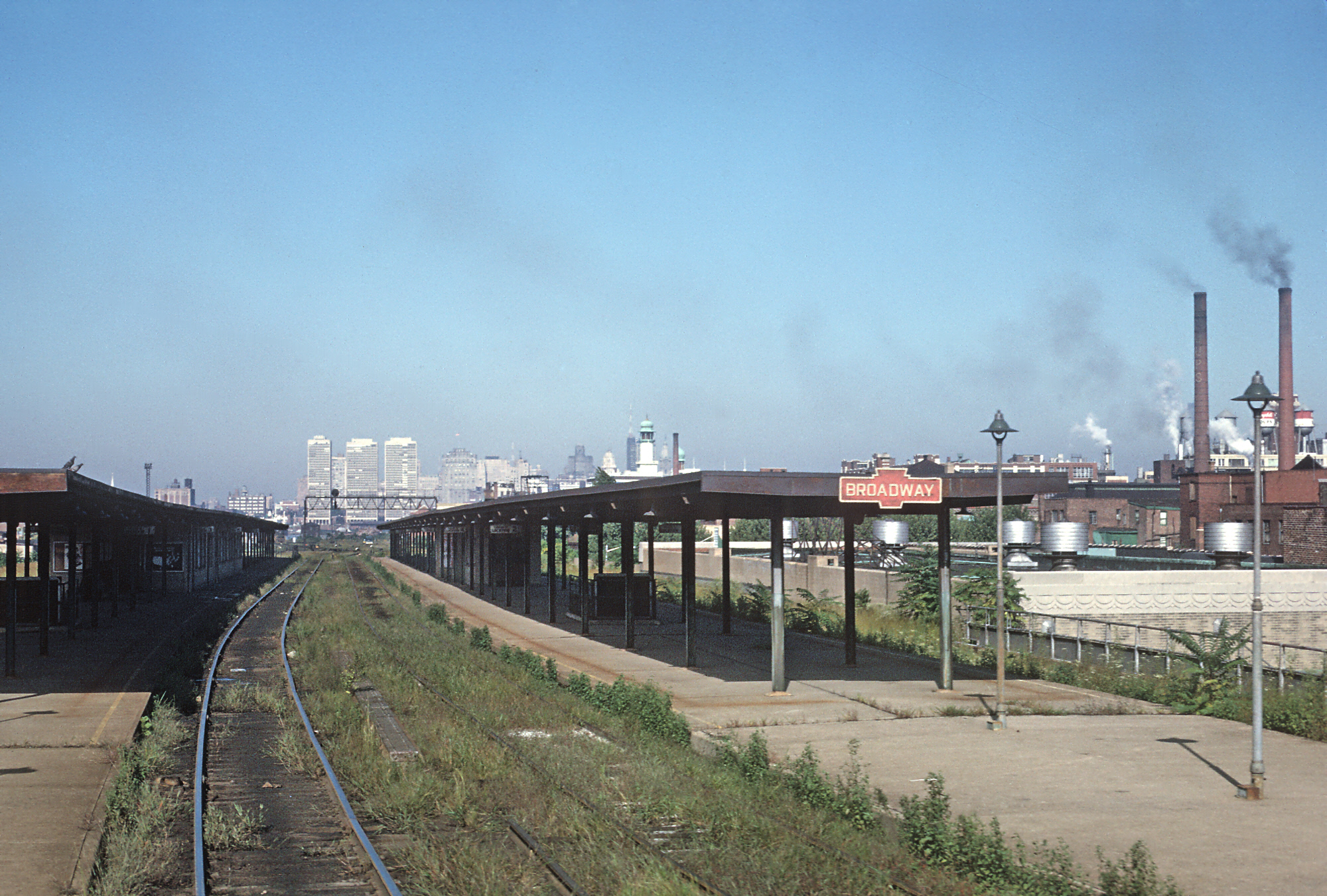
Broadway station of the Pennsylvania-Reading Seashore Lines in September 1965

The Pennsylvania Railroad opened Broadway station on the site on October 8, 1908. It was built as part of the elevation of the Pennsylvania's line through downtown Camden. It replaced a station one block east at Haddon Avenue. The West Jersey and Seashore Railroad also used the station. With the creation of the joint Pennsylvania-Reading Seashore Lines in 1933, former Atlantic City Railroad services also began stopping at Broadway.

Broadway was selected as the eastern terminus of the Bridge Line, a rapid transit line linking Camden with Philadelphia. New underground platforms were built beneath the existing station. Service began on June 7, 1936. Provision was made in the tunnel for future expansion to the east. The Pennsylvania Railroad abandoned its ferry service between Philadelphia and Camden on March 31, 1952, and Broadway became the new western terminus of its Camden services. Broadway was enlarged in response, including the addition of an escalator to its elevated platforms.

The development of the PATCO Speedline in the mid-1960s resulted in dramatic changes to the railroad lines around Broadway. The Pennsylvania-Reading Seashore Lines abandoned its main line between Camden and West Haddonfield on January 16, 1966; Atlantic City trains bypassed Camden and terminated at 30th Street Station in Philadelphia. Services on the Pennsylvania's Pemberton Branch and the PRSL's Millville Branch remained until October 3, when they were shifted to a new station on the Amboy Branch at 12th and Federal.

The Bridge Line was temporarily closed on December 28, 1968 for conversion into the PATCO Speedline. The Lindenwold–City Hall segment, including Broadway, reopened on January 4, 1969.

The surface-level bus transfer center opened on May 17, 1989 as Camden Transportation Center and was renamed in 1994 for Walter Rand, a former New Jersey State Senator, who specialized in transportation issues while serving in both houses of the New Jersey Legislature. River Line service began on March 15, 2004.

The station is the planned northern terminus of the Glassboro–Camden Line, an 18-mile (28.97 km) diesel multiple unit (DMU) light rail system projected for completion in 2028.

In October 2021, NJ Transit announced plans to replace the facility with a new one, awarding a contract to conduct conceptual design, preliminary and final engineering and construction assistance services to HNTB.

== Bus service ==
The transportation center is served by several New Jersey Transit bus routes 313, 315, 316, 317, 400, 401, 402, 403, 404, 405, 406, 407, 408, 409, 410, 412, 413, 418, 419, 450, 451, 452, 453, 457 and 551.

It is also served by Greyhound Lines and a South Jersey Transportation Authority shuttle to the Pureland Industrial Complex.

== Notable places nearby ==
The station is within walking distance of the following notable places:

- Cooper University Hospital
- Freedom Mortgage Pavilion
- Walt Whitman House

== Gallery ==
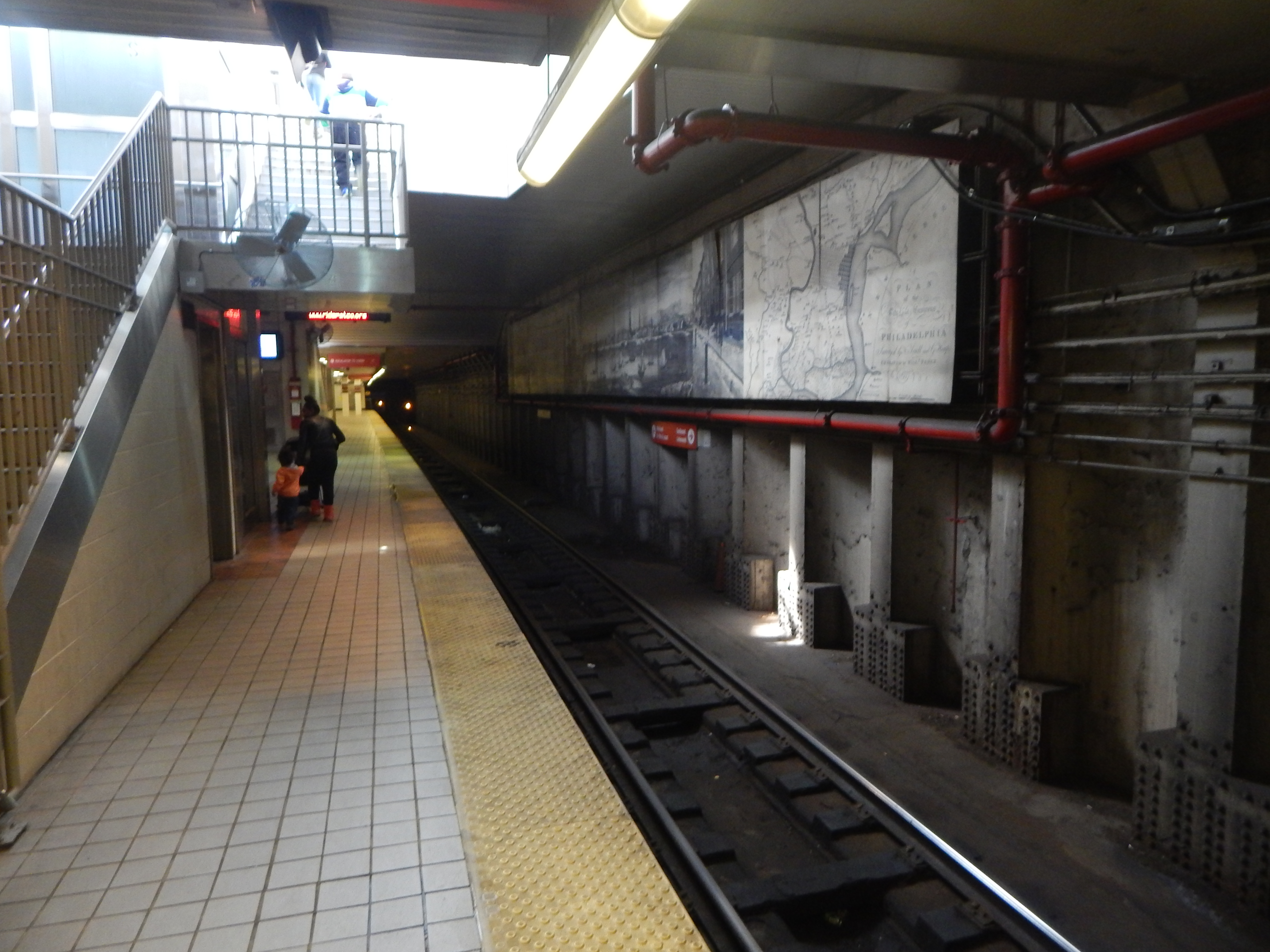
Broadway station serving PATCO Speedline

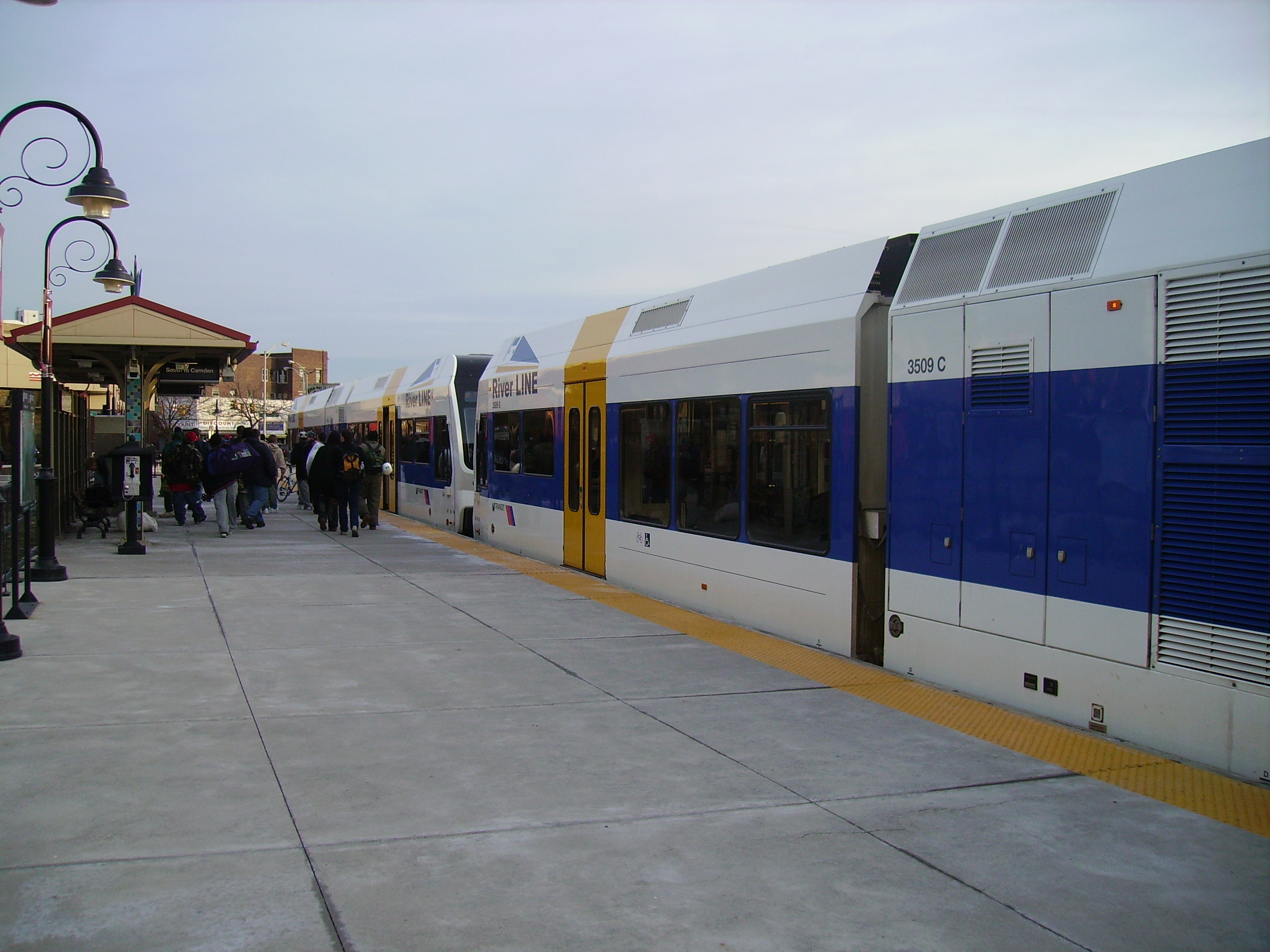
River Line train at Walter Rand Transportation Center

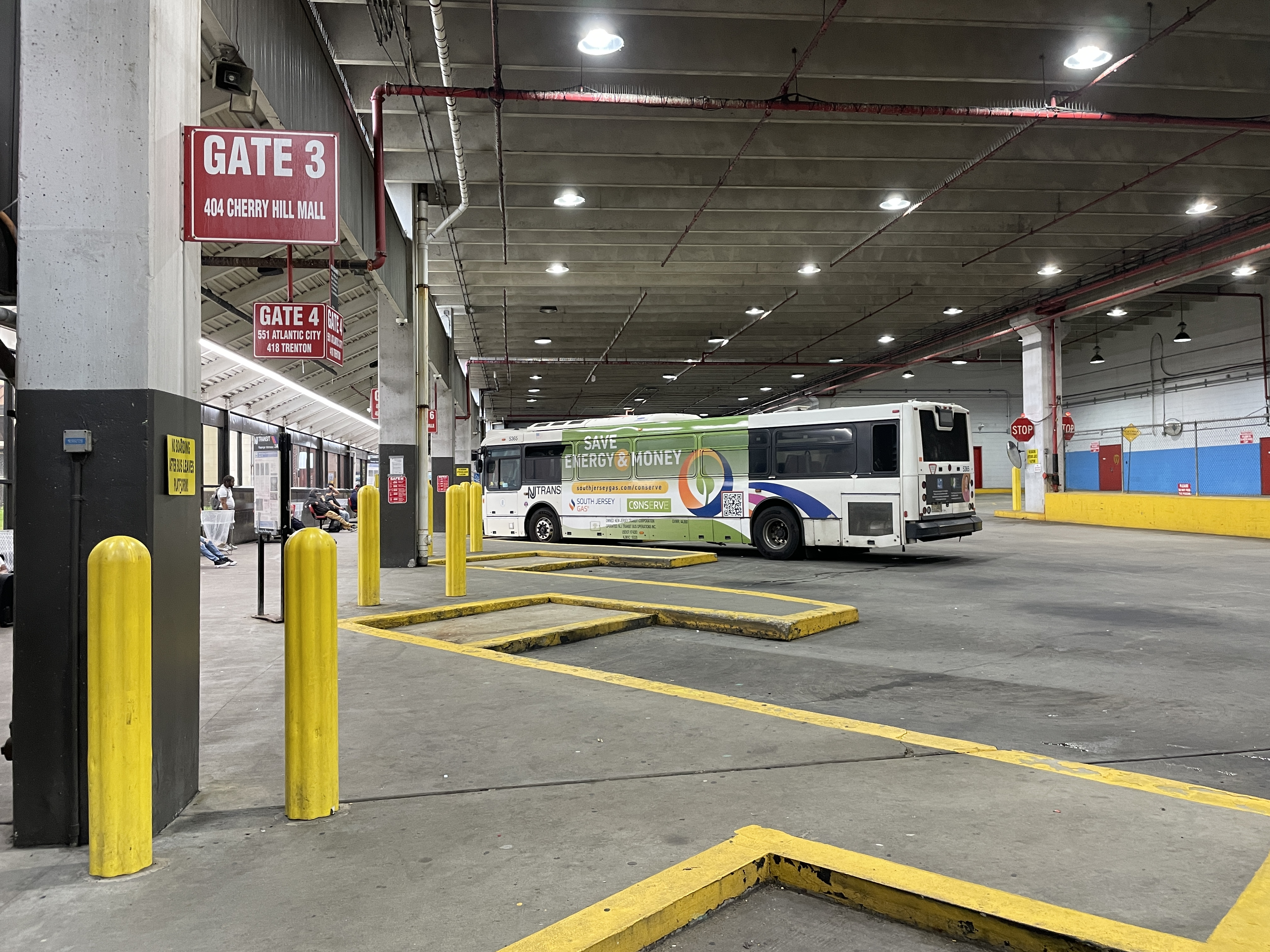
Bus gates serving NJ Transit buses
