= List of NJ Transit bus routes (400–449) =

#25289 on the #403 line in Lindenwold.

New Jersey Transit operates the following bus routes across Camden, Gloucester, and Salem counties, with most running to Philadelphia via the Benjamin Franklin Bridge. At the time that the routes were numbered as such all of these routes crossed the Delaware River via the Benjamin Franklin Bridge; the 403, 405, 407, 413, and 419 have since been cut back to Camden. (The 418 was created as a separate designation of the 409.) All routes into Philadelphia operate via 6th, Market, Broad, and Vine Streets in Center City Philadelphia.

Effective Monday, September 19, 2011, bus routes 400 and 403 operate as "Exact Fare".

== Routes ==
All service shown is for the full route except for branching. WRTC stands for Walter Rand Transportation Center in the table below.

Route	Western terminus	Service in Camden	Main routes of travel	New Jersey terminus	Fare collection	Notes	History	Garage
400	Philadelphia	WRTC and local service	Black Horse Pike	Sicklerville	Exact fare		Formerly Route F	Washington Township
401	Philadelphia	WRTC and local service	Broadway/Kings Highway; Route 45	Salem	Full service	Select Saturday and most Sunday trips end in Woodbury	Formerly Route G	Washington Township
402	Philadelphia	WRTC and local service	Broadway; Crown Point Road	Pennsville	Full service	No weekday midday service; Limited service on weekends	Service to Pedricktown was discontinued on June 22, 2002.; Formerly Route J	Washington Township
403	Camden	WRTC and local service	White Horse Pike; Sicklerville Road	Turnersville	Exact fare		Service to Philadelphia was cut back to WRTC on September 5, 2009.; Formerly Route L/M/O	Washington Township
404	Philadelphia	WRTC and local service	Federal Street; Westfield Avenue; Park Avenue	Cherry Hill Mall	Exact fare		Formerly Route D	Newton Avenue
405	Camden	WRTC and local service	Federal Street/Kings Highway	Cherry Hill Mall	Exact fare	Some rush hour trips are extended to Kingston Estates	Formerly Route 6, then later 456	Newton Avenue
406	Philadelphia	WRTC and local service	Route 70	Berlin	Full service		Formerly Route P; Service extended to Horizon Corporate Center on September 2, 2000.	Washington Township
407	Camden	WRTC and local service	Maple Avenue/Main Street	Moorestown Mall	Exact fare	Select Early Morning and Late night service operates via Mount Laurel	Formerly Route 7	Newton Avenue
408	Philadelphia	WRTC and local service	Delsea Drive	Millville	Full service		Formerly Route T	Washington Township
409	Philadelphia	WRTC and local service	Route 130	Trenton Transit Center	Full service	Additional service between White Horse and Downtown Trenton available on 603/613	Formerly Route 9A	Newton Avenue
410	Philadelphia	WRTC and local service	Broadway; Route 45; Route 77	Bridgeton	Full service		Formerly Route S	Washington Township
412	Philadelphia	WRTC and local service	Broadway; Main Street	Glassboro	Full service	Service operating on Sunday is part of a pilot program effective April 2021.	Service to the Rowan University campus began on January 4, 2003.; Formerly Route W	Washington Township
413	Camden	WRTC and local service	Route 38; Kings Highway/Marne Highway/Washington Street; High Street	Florence River Line Station	Exact fare		Formerly Route 71; Service extended to Florence on August 31, 2019.	Newton Avenue
414	Philadelphia; JFK Blvd at 30th Street	Bridge Plaza only	Admiral Wilson Blvd.	Moorestown Mall	Exact fare	Weekday Peak Hour Service Only (AM to Philadelphia, PM to Moorestown)	Express variant of 407, created January 8, 2011.; Service extended to 30th Street Station on January 17, 2017.	Newton Avenue
417	Philadelphia; JFK Blvd at 30th Street	Bridge Plaza only	Route 130; Limited stops	Willingboro & Mt. Holly	Full service	Weekday Peak Hour Service Only (AM to Philadelphia, PM to Willingboro & Mt. Holly); Local service to/from Willingboro-Mt. Holly	Express variant of the 409 for Philadelphia-oriented service.; Formerly Route 9B; Former 409 Philadelphia Express. Renumbered to 417 on January 10, 2009.; Service extended to 30th Street Station on September 17, 2017.	Newton Avenue
418	Camden	WRTC and Route 38	I-295	Trenton Transit Center	Full service	One AM and PM peak-hour trip only (AM to Trenton, PM to Camden)	Express variant of the 409 for Trenton-oriented service.; Operated two short turn trips from Willingboro/Mt. Holly to Trenton, discontinued and merged into the regular 418 routing on September 3, 2016.; Service via Sunset Road and Salem Road initiated on January 6, 2007.; Former 409 Trenton Express. Renumbered to 418 on September 3, 2005.; Formerly Route 9C	Newton Avenue
419	Camden	WRTC and local service	River Road; Broad Street	Riverside	Exact fare		Formerly Route 9; Route cut back from Burlington Towne Center to Riverside on September 1, 2015.	Newton Avenue

== Former routes ==
This list includes routes that have been renumbered or are now operated by private companies.

Route	Terminals		Major streets	Current status
411	Philadelphia	Paulsboro	Crown Point Road	Route became #461, then was later merged into #455 line.
414 (first use)	Frankford, Pennsylvania	Marlton	Route 73	Discontinued due to low ridership.
416	WRTC	UPS Air Hub, Tinicum	I-95	Limited shift change service; Discontinued due to low ridership.
423	Rodney Square, Wilmington	Penns Grove	Shell Road	Discontinued in 2010 due to low ridership.; Operated by Salem County Transit; Formerly Route 123
