= Entertainment Center station =

Light rail station in New Jersey, USA

Waterfront Entertainment Center
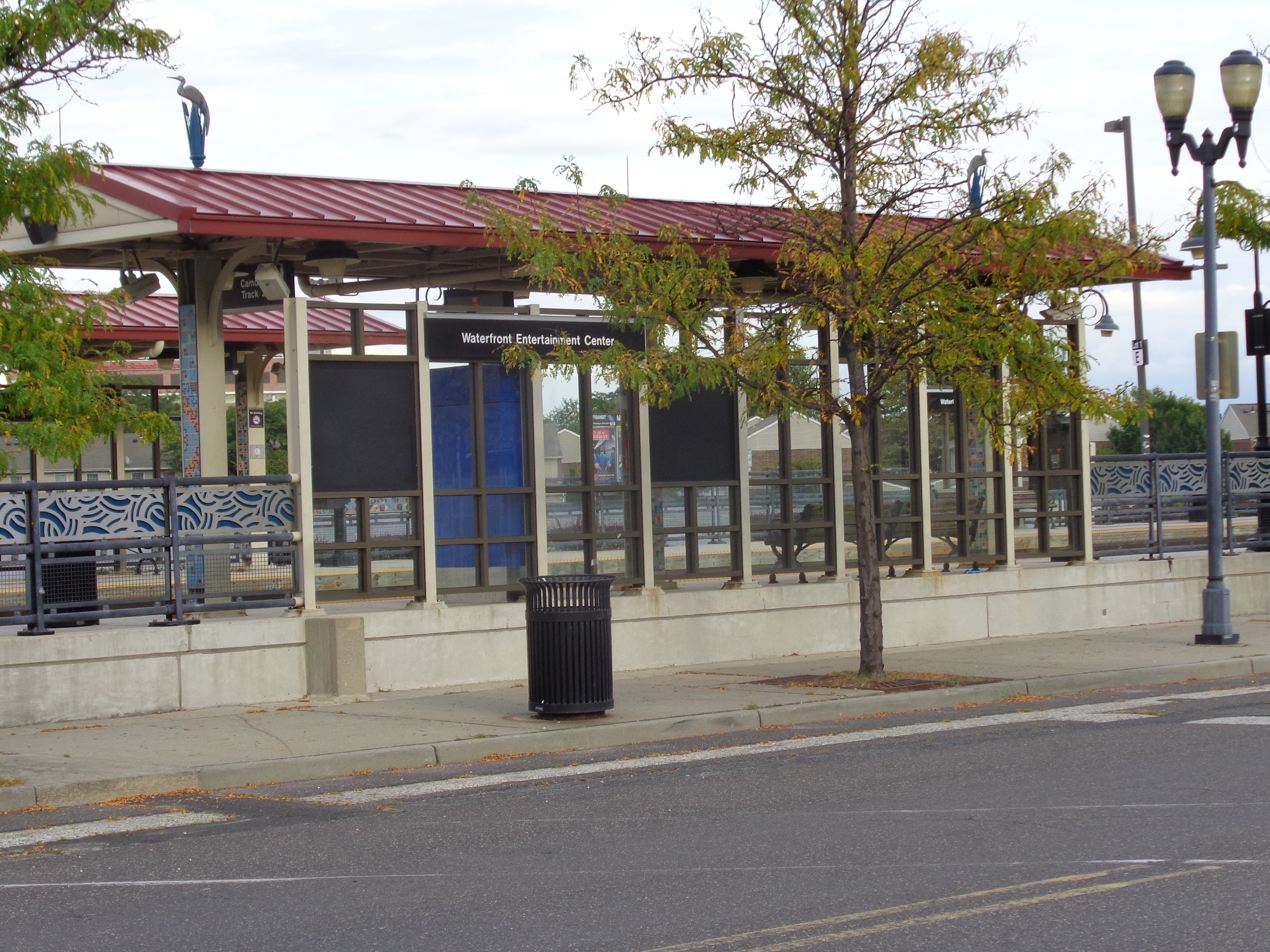
- Waterfront Entertainment Center station platform

General information
- Location: Delaware Avenue; Camden, New Jersey
- Coordinates: 39°56′27″N 75°7′43″W
- Owner: New Jersey Transit
- Platforms: 2 side platforms
- Tracks: 2

Construction
- Accessible: Yes

Other information
- Fare zone: 1

History
- Opened: March 15, 2004

Services
Preceding station	NJ Transit	Following station
Terminus	River Line	Aquarium toward Trenton
Location

Entertainment Center station (signed as Waterfront Entertainment Center) is a station on the River Line light rail system, located on Delaware Avenue in Camden, New Jersey. It is the southern terminus of the River Line, and is named for the nearby Freedom Mortgage Pavilion on the Camden Waterfront.

The station opened on March 15, 2004. Northbound service is available to the Trenton Rail Station with connections to New Jersey Transit trains to New York City, SEPTA trains to Philadelphia, Pennsylvania, and Amtrak trains. Transfers to the PATCO Speedline are available at the Walter Rand Transportation Center.
