= List of Pennsylvania Railroad lines east of Pittsburgh =

The following railroad lines were owned or operated by the Pennsylvania Railroad east of Pittsburgh and Erie.

== New York City to Philadelphia ==
- Main Line (New York to Philadelphia)
  - Harrison Branch (Harrison)
  - Jersey City Branch (Harrison to Jersey City)
    - Harsimus Branch (Harsimus Junction to Harsimus Cove)
    - Passaic Branch (Meadows to Newark)
      - Lister Branch (Newark)
  - Meadows Branch No. 1 (Meadows)
  - Meadows Branch No. 2 (Meadows)
  - Centre Street Branch (Harrison to Newark)
  - West Newark Branch (West Newark Junction to West Newark)
  - Greenville Branch (Newark to Greenville)
  - Perth Amboy and Woodbridge Branch (Perth Amboy Junction to Perth Amboy)
  - Bonhamtown Branch (Metuchen to Nixon)
  - Millstone branch (Millstone Junction to East Millstone)
  - Kingston Branch (Monmouth Junction to Kingston)
    - Rocky Hill Branch (Kingston to Rocky Hill)
  - Princeton Branch (Princeton Junction to Princeton)
  - Philadelphia and Long Branch Railroad
  - Belvidere Delaware Branch (Trenton to Manunka Chunk)
    - Millham Branch (Trenton)
    - South Trenton Branch (Trenton)
    - Enterprise Branch (Trenton)
    - Flemington Branch (Flemington Junction to Flemington)
    - Martins Creek Branch (Martins Creek)
  - Bristol Branch (Bristol)
  - Bustleton Branch (Holmesburg Junction to Bustleton)
  - Kensington and Tacony Branch (Tacony to Kensington)
  - Trenton Avenue Branch (Frankford Junction to Kensington)
    - Frankford Street Branch (Philadelphia)
    - Filter Street Branch (Philadelphia)
    - Westmoreland Street Branch (Philadelphia)
    - Delaware Avenue Branch (Kensington to Philadelphia)
      - Commerce Street Branch (Kensington)
      - Canal Street Branch (Shackamaxon)
  - Delair Branch (Frankford Junction to West Haddonfield)
    - Pemberton Branch (Pavonia to Pemberton)
  - Oxford Road Branch (Philadelphia)
  - Fairhill Branch (Fairhill)
  - Stifftown Branch (North Philadelphia)
  - Chestnut Hill Branch (North Philadelphia to Chestnut Hill)
    - Midvale Branch (Midvale)
    - Fort Washington Branch (Philadelphia to Fort Hill)
  - Engelside Branch (Engelside)
  - New York-Pittsburgh Subway (West Philadelphia)
  - River Line (West Philadelphia)
  - Belmont Branch (West Philadelphia Connection ZOO to Reading Co at Belmont Jct)
  - West Philadelphia Elevated Branch (West Philadelphia)
    - Delaware Extension (West Philadelphia to Philadelphia)
      - Washington Avenue Branch (Philadelphia)
      - Girard Point Branch (Philadelphia)
      - Swanson Street Branch (Philadelphia)
- Amboy Branch (South Amboy to Camden)
  - Jamesburg Branch (Jamesburg to Monmouth Junction)
  - Freehold Branch (Jamesburg to Sea Girt)
  - Bordentown Branch (Bordentown to Trenton)
  - Kinkora Branch (Kinkora to Lewistown)
  - Florence Branch (Florence)
  - Burlington and Mount Holly Branch (Burlington to Mount Holly line was abandoned in 1927)
  - Petty's Island Branch (Beideman to Petty's Island)
  - Pemberton Branch (Pavonia to Pemberton)
    - Mount Holly and Medford Branch (Mount Holly to Medford)
    - Toms River Branch (Birmingham to Bay Head)

== Philadelphia to Washington ==
- Pennsylvania Main Line
  - West Chester Branch (West Philadelphia to West Chester)
    - Newtown Square Branch (Fernwood to Newtown Square)
      - Cardington Branch (Millbourne Mills)
    - Octoraro Branch (Wawa to Port Deposit)
  - 60th Street Branch (West Philadelphia)
  - Chester and Philadelphia Branch (West Philadelphia to Chester)
  - Chester Creek Branch (Chester to Lenni)
  - Lamokin Run Branch (Chester)
    - South Chester Branch (Chester to Marcus Hook)
      - Claymont Branch (Marcus Hook)
  - Linwood Branch (Marcus Hook)
  - Shellpot Branch (Edge Moor to Newport)
    - Edge Moor Branch (Edge Moor)
  - Brandywine Branch (Wilmington)
  - West Wilmington Branch (Wilmington)
  - Delaware Branch (Newport to Cape Charles)
    - New Castle Cut-off (New Castle)
    - Centreville Branch (Townsend to Centreville)
      - Chestertown Branch (Massey to Chestertown)
    - Smyrna Branch (Clayton to Smyrna)
    - Oxford Branch (Clayton to Oxford)
    - Delaware, Maryland and Virginia Branch (Harrington to Ross)
      - Milton Branch (Ellendale to Milton)
      - Rehoboth Branch (Georgetown to Rehoboth)
    - Cambridge Branch (Seaford to Cambridge)
    - Crisfield Secondary Branch Originally opened as Eastern Shore Railroad between Princess Anne (Westover) and Annamessex (Crisfield), Md.
    - Cape Charles Branch (Cape CHarles to Kiptopeke)
  - Newark and Delaware City Branch (Newark to Delaware City)
  - Havre de Grace Branch (Havre de Grace)
  - Port Road Branch (Perryville to Columbia)
    - Perryville Branch (Frenchtown to Principio)
  - Sparrow's Point Branch (Baltimore to Sparrow's Point)
  - President Street Branch (Bay View to Baltimore)
  - Claremont Branch (Baltimore)
  - Catonsville Branch (Loudon Park to Catonsville)
  - Fort George G. Meade Branch (Odenton to Fort George G. Meade)
  - Pope's Creek Branch (Bowie to Pope's Creek)
  - Magruder Branch (Landover to Washington)
  - Rosslyn Branch (Arlington to Rosslyn)
- Northern Central Branch (Baltimore to Wago Junction)
  - Green Spring Branch (Hollins to Chattolanee)
- York Branch (Columbia to York)
  - Frederick Branch (York to Frederick)
    - Union Bridge Branch (Keymar to Union Bridge)
- Baltimore and Eastern Railroad (Marsh Siding to Mardela Springs)
  - Mill Street Branch (Salisbury)
- McDaniel Branch (Easton to McDaniel)
- Denton Branch (Denton to Love Point)

== Philadelphia to Harrisburg ==
- Pennsylvania Main Line
  - 36th Street Connection (West Philadelphia)
  - 32nd Street Branch (West Philadelphia)
  - Schuylkill Branch (West Philadelphia to New Boston Junction)
    - Pencoyd Branch (Barmouth to West Manayunk)
    - Royersford Branch (Royersford)
    - Court Street Branch (Reading)
    - Minersville Branch (Pottsville to Lytle)
    - Shenandoah Branch (Frackville to Shenandoah)
      - Gilberton Branch (Gilberton)
      - Girardville Branch (Girardville)
    - Morea Branch (Morea)
  - West Chester Branch (Frazer to West Chester)
  - Trenton Branch (Glen Loch to Morrisville)
    - Philadelphia and Thorndale Branch (Glen Loch to Thorndale)
      - Phoenixville Branch (Glen Loch to Phoenixville)
    - Swedeland Branch (Swedeland)
  - New Holland Branch (Chester Valley Intersection to Conestoga)
  - Coatesville Branch (Pomeroy)
  - Pomeroy Branch (Pomeroy to Chatham)
  - Atglen and Susquehanna Branch (Parkesburg to Wago Junction)
    - York Haven Line (Wago Junction to Marysville)
  - Quarryville Branch (Lancaster to Quarryville)
  - Lebanon Branch (Conewago to Lebanon)
    - North Lebanon Branch (Lebanon)
    - East Lebanon Branch (Lebanon)
  - Columbia Branch (Dillerville to Royalton)
  - Steelton Canal Branch (Harrisburg)

== Harrisburg to Pittsburgh ==
- Pennsylvania Main Line
  - Cumberland Valley Branch (Harrisburg to Winchester)
    - Dillsburg Branch (Dillsburg Junction to Dillsburg)
    - Waynesboro Branch (Chambersburg to Waynesboro)
    - South Penn Branch (Marion to Richmond)
      - Mercersburg Branch (Mercersburg Junction to Mercersburg)
  - Milroy Branch
  - Petersburg Branch (part became Lower Trail)
    - Clover Creek Branch
    - Springfield Branch
    - Canoe Creek Branch
      - Crissman Branch
    - New Portage Branch (from west of Gallitzin Tunnels to Hollidaysburg; part became a segment of the 6 to 10 Trail)
  - Fairbrook Branch
  - Bald Eagle Branch
    - Clearfield Branch
      - Osceola Branch
      - Moshannon Branch
        - Trout Run Branch
        - Big Run Branch
        - Moshannon and Clearfield Branch
          - Beaver Branch
          - Ednie Branch
        - Coal Run Branch
          - Morgan Run Branch
          - Burley Branch
        - Goss Run Branch No. 1
          - Goss Run Branch No. 2
            - Goss Run Branch No. 3
        - Houtzdale Branch
        - Amesville Branch No. 1
          - Amesville Branch No. 2
        - Little Muddy Run Branch
          - Janesville Branch
        - Muddy Run Branch
          - Smoke Run Branch
        - Banian Branch
        - Betz Branch
      - Mapleton Branch No. 1
        - Mapleton Branch No. 2
      - Philipsburg Branch
      - Derby Branch
    - Snow-Shoe Branch
      - Sugar Camp Branch
        - Grauer Branch
        - Big Sandy Branch
    - Bellefonte Branch
  - Hollidaysburg Branch
    - Morrison's Cove Branch
      - Bloomfield Branch
      - Martinsburg Branch
  - Irvona Branch
    - Stevens Branch
    - Hegarty Branch
    - Mayes Branch
      - South Witmer Branch
    - Bellwood Branch
      - Stroud Branch
  - Cresson Branch
    - Black Lick Branch (became part of Ghost Town Trail)
      - Coal Pit Run Branch
      - Shuman Run Branch
      - Rexis Branch
    - Susquehanna Extension Branch
      - Luther Branch
      - Sterling Branch
      - Walnut Run Branch
      - Porter Run Branch
      - Gardner Run Branch
      - Moss Creek Branch
    - Patton Branch No. 2
      - Patton Branch No. 3
    - Patton Branch No. 1
    - Hastings Branch
    - La Jose Branch
    - McGees Branch
      - Glen Campbell Branch
        - McCoy Run Branch
      - Suter Branch
    - Mahaffey Branch
    - Bear Run Branch
    - Hillman Branch
    - Elk Run Branch
  - Lilly Branch
  - Ben's Creek Branch
    - Martin Branch
    - Sonman Branch
  - Summerhill Branch
  - South Fork Branch
    - Beaver Branch
      - Llanfair Branch
    - Paint Creek Branch
      - Eureka Branch No. 37
      - Shade Creek Branch
        - Reitz Branch
    - Windber Branch
  - Johnstown Branch
  - Sang Hollow Extension
  - New Florence Branch
  - Bradenville Branch
  - Unity Branch
    - Lippincott Branch
  - Alexandria Branch
    - Jamison Branch
  - South-west Branch
  - Brush Creek Branch
  - Bull Run Branch
  - Jeanette Branch
  - Manor Branch
  - Youghiogheny Branch
  - Turtle Creek Branch
    - Lyons Run Branch
  - East Pittsburgh Branch
  - Port Perry Branch
  - Brilliant Branch
  - Duquesne Way Elevated Branch
- Bedford Branch
  - Mt. Dallas Branch
- Rockville Branch
  - Elmira Branch
    - Lykens Valley Branch
    - Bellefonte Branch
      - Laurelton Branch
    - Berwick Branch
      - Millville Branch
    - Williamsport and Linden Branch
    - Canal Branch
    - Williamsport Lumber Branch
    - Sodus Bay Branch
      - Marion Branch
    - Canandaigua Lake Branch
- Philadelphia and Erie Branch
  - Newberry Branch
  - Low Grade Branch (Redbank to Driftwood on Buffalo Line, section became Redbank Valley Trail)
    - Brookville Branch
    - Sligo Branch (became Sligo Spur of Redbank Valley Trail)
  - Ridgway Branch
  - 10th Street Branch
- Wilkes-Barre Branch
  - Glen Lyon Branch
  - West Nanticoke Branch
- Shamokin Valley Branch
  - Lancaster Branch
  - Scott Branch
  - Green Ridge Branch
    - Fagely Branch
  - Montelius Branch
- Lewistown Branch
- Catawissa Branch
  - Nescopeck Branch
- Monongahela Branch
  - Whitehall Branch
  - Axle Works Branch
  - Streets Run Branch
  - McKeesport Branch
  - Peters Creek Branch (became part of Montour Trail)
  - Ellsworth Branch
    - Cokeburg Branch
  - Redstone Branch
    - Grindstone Branch
    - Keister Branch
    - Vance Mill Branch
- South-west Branch
  - Radebaugh Branch
    - Hempfield Branch
      - Andrews Run Branch
  - Sewickley Branch
    - Boyer Run Branch
    - Brinker Run Branch
    - Mammoth Branch
    - Bessemer Branch
      - Marguerite Branch
  - Hunker Branch
  - Yukon Branch
    - Whyel Branch
    - Hunter Run Branch
    - Youghiogheny Branch
  - Tarr Branch
  - Scottdale Branch
  - Everson and Broad Ford Branch
  - Opossum Run Branch
  - Dunbar Branch
  - Coal Lick Run Branch
    - Rainey Branch
  - Fairchance Branch
    - Oliphant Branch
- Indiana Branch
  - Blairsville Branch
  - Yellow Creek Branch
- Conemaugh Line
  - Avonmore Branch
  - Apollo Branch
  - Butler Branch
  - Bailey's Run Branch
- Allegheny Branch
  - Plum Creek Branch
  - Indian Run Branch
  - Pucketa Branch
  - Schenley Branch
  - East Brady Branch
  - Salamanca Branch
    - Kinzua Branch
    - Rochester Branch
      - Nunda Branch
      - Rochester Terminal Branch
  - Chautauqua Branch
- Buffalo Line
  - Clermont Branch
  - Salamanca Branch
  - West Seneca Branch

== See also ==
- List of Pennsylvania Railroad lines west of Pittsburgh
