= Burlington Branch =

History
- Opened: June 18, 1849
- Closed: October 6, 1925

Technical
- Line length: 7.6 mi (12.2 km)
- Track gauge: 1,435 mm (4 ft 8 1/2 in) standard gauge
- Electrification: 500 V DC (1895–1901)

The Burlington Branch was a railway line in the state of New Jersey, in the United States. It ran approximately 7 miles (11 km) from Burlington, New Jersey, to Mount Holly, New Jersey. The line was built by the Burlington and Mount Holly Railroad and Transportation Company between 1848 and 1849. It eventually became part of the Pennsylvania Railroad's network. It was the site of an early railway electrification experiment between 1895 and 1901. The line was abandoned in 1925.

== History ==
The Burlington and Mount Holly Railroad and Transportation Company completed its original line between Burlington, New Jersey, and Mount Holly, New Jersey, on June 18, 1849. At the northern end, the line connected with the main line of the Camden and Amboy Railroad. In the south, the Burlington and Mount Holly extended its line another 6.5 miles (10.5 km) east to Pemberton, New Jersey, on January 1, 1863.

The Burlington and Mount Holly Railroad was consolidated with the Camden, Moorestown, Hainesport and Mount Holly Horse Car Railroad on May 2, 1866, to form the Camden and Burlington County Railroad. The new company built west from Mount Holly to Pavonia (near Camden, New Jersey), also on the Camden and Amboy's main line. This extension was completed on October 21, 1867, at which point the Camden and Amboy leased the Camden and Burlington County Railroad. The Camden and Amboy was consolidated with two other companies in 1872 to create the United New Jersey Railroad and Canal Company, which was leased by the Pennsylvania Railroad. The Pennsylvania Railroad assumed the lease of the Camden and Burlington County Railroad.

The Pennsylvania Railroad selected the Burlington Branch for an early experiment in railway electrification. It constructed a power plant in Mount Holly and electrified the branch with 500 V direct current, using overhead wires. Three converted combine cars provided local service between Mount Holly and East Burlington, on the east side of Assiscunk Creek. Steam locomotives continued to handle through service over the branch. Electrified service began on July 22, 1895. The electrified service was a technical success, but did not dramatically improve the financial performance of the branch line. The power plant was destroyed in a fire on October 29, 1901, and the Pennsylvania Railroad decided to abandon the electrification.

The Camden and Burlington County Railroad was consolidated with the Mount Holly, Lumberton and Medford Railroad and Vincentown Branch of the Burlington County Railroad in 1915 to form the Camden and Burlington County Railway, still leased by the Pennsylvania Railroad. The Pennsylvania Railroad abandoned the branch on October 6, 1925.
