= Mount Holly and Medford Branch =

Railway in New Jersey

History
- Opened: December 20, 1869
- Closed: 1976

Technical
- Line length: 5.94 mi (9.56 km)
- Track gauge: 1,435 mm (4 ft 8 1/2 in) standard gauge

The Mount Holly and Medford Branch was a railway line in the state of New Jersey, in the United States. It ran approximately 6 miles (9.7 km) from Mount Holly, New Jersey, to Medford, New Jersey. It was built by the Mount Holly, Lumberton and Medford Railroad in 1869, and leased by the Camden and Amboy Railroad upon completion. The Pennsylvania Railroad subsequently assumed the lease. The line was not conveyed to Conrail and was abandoned in 1976.

== History ==
The Mount Holly, Lumberton and Medford Railroad was incorporated on April 2, 1866. Construction of its line between Mount Holly and Medford, New Jersey began in July 1869 and was completed on December 20, 1869. At Mount Holly the line connected with the Pemberton Branch of the Camden and Burlington County Railroad. The Camden and Amboy Railroad leased the Mount Holly, Lumberton and Medford Railroad upon the completion of the line. The Camden and Amboy was consolidated with two other companies in 1872 to create the United New Jersey Railroad and Canal Company, which was leased by the Pennsylvania Railroad.

The Philadelphia, Marlton and Medford Railroad, a predecessor of the West Jersey and Seashore Railroad, completed its own line to Medford via Haddonfield, New Jersey, on October 12, 1881. The West Jersey and Seashore Railroad abandoned that branch in 1931.

Ownership of the line passed to the Camden and Burlington County Railway in 1915 when the Mount Holly, Lumberton and Medford Railroad was consolidated with the Camden and Burlington County Railroad and Vincentown Branch of the Burlington County Railroad. Passenger service between Medford and Mount Holly ended on November 27, 1926. The Camden and Burlington County Railway was merged into the Penndel Company, a Pennsylvania Railroad holding company, in 1958. The Medford and Mount Holly Branch was not conveyed to Conrail in 1976 and was subsequently abandoned.
