= Vincentown Branch =

Railway line in New Jersey

History
- Opened: May 10, 1864
- Closed: September 24, 1927

Technical
- Line length: 2.77 mi (4.46 km)
- Track gauge: 1,435 mm (4 ft 8 1/2 in) standard gauge

The Vincentown Branch was a railway line in the state of New Jersey, in the United States. It ran 2.77 miles (4.46 km) from Ewansville, New Jersey, to Vincentown, New Jersey. It was built by the Vincentown Branch of the Burlington County Railroad in 1864 and leased by various companies thereafter, becoming part of the Pennsylvania Railroad network in 1871. It was abandoned in 1927.

== History ==
The Vincentown Branch of the Burlington County Railroad was incorporated on March 15, 1861, to build a line from Ewansville, New Jersey, to Vincentown, New Jersey. In Ewansville it would connect with the Pemberton extension of the Burlington County Railroad, then under construction. Its charter allowed it to build short lateral branches to any of the marl pits in the area. The line to Pemberton opened on January 1, 1863. Construction of the line to Vincentown began in 1864 and was completed on May 10, 1864.

John S. Irick was largely responsible for the construction of the line. His farm was located near Vincentown, and he was also proprietor of the Vincentown Marl Company.

The Vincentown Branch of the Burlington County Railroad was leased by various companies thereafter, culminating in the Pennsylvania Railroad in 1871. In 1915, the company was consolidated with the Camden and Burlington County Railroad and Mount Holly, Lumberton and Medford Railroad in 1915 to form the Camden and Burlington County Railway. The branch was abandoned on September 24, 1927.
