= Ewansville, New Jersey =

Populated place in Burlington County, New Jersey, US

- Unincorporated community
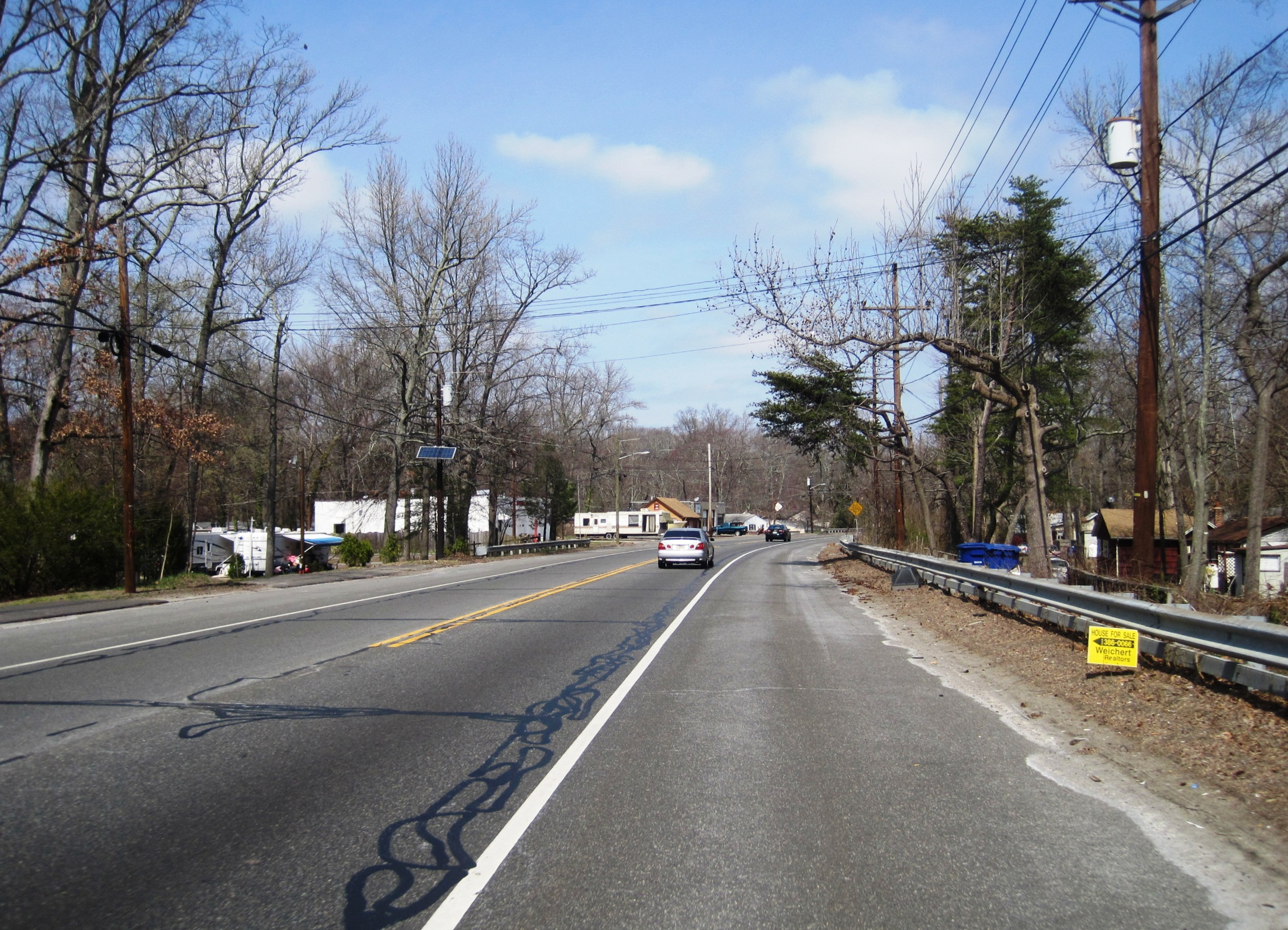
- Looking north along US 206

- Location of Ewansville in Burlington County (Inset: Location of county within the state of New Jersey) Ewansville (New Jersey) Ewansville (the United States)
- Coordinates: 39°58′42″N 74°44′07″W
- Country: United States
- State: New Jersey
- County: Burlington
- Township: Eastampton, Pemberton, Southampton
- Elevation: 39 ft (12 m)
- Time zone: UTC−05:00 (Eastern (EST))
  - Summer (DST): UTC−04:00 (EDT)
- GNIS feature ID: 876246

Ewansville or Ewanville is an unincorporated community located in Burlington County, in the U.S. state of New Jersey. The community is centered on the crossing of US 206 and the North Branch of the Rancocas Creek just north of the former Pemberton Branch of the Pennsylvania Railroad. Ewansville was the site of a station on the aforementioned railroad and was the terminus for a short spur track to Vincentown.

Ewansville is located near the tripoint of Eastampton, Pemberton and Southampton townships. Pemberton Township is situated north of the creek and east of US 206, Eastampton Township generally to the west of US 206, and Southampton comprises the remaining area. Some trailer parks line US 206 in this area; permanent houses are located on nearby Railroad Avenue and Indian Trail.

== Transportation ==
The Burlington and Mount Holly Railroad and Transportation Company began building a line from Mount Holly to Pemberton by way of Ewansville in 1860. It was opened on January 1, 1863 and the railroad changed its name to the Burlington County Railroad that July. The Vincentown Branch of the Burlington County Railroad opened a connecting line from Ewansville south to Vincentown on May 10, 1864. In 1866, the Burlington County Railroad was merged into the Camden and Burlington County Railroad, which leased the Vincentown Branch. The lines through Ewansville were subsequently operated by the Camden and Amboy Railroad and the Pennsylvania Railroad, which made the line to Pemberton its Pemberton Branch. The Vincentown Branch was abandoned in 1927. The Pemberton Branch ultimately passed to Conrail, which abandoned the section east of Mount Holly in 1982.

== Media ==
Ewansville is home to FM radio station 107.9 W300CZ, a translator for WPRB-HD3. W300CZ is Oldies 107.9 and 95.1 WOLD. The translator could not be heard in Ewansville since 2016, yet it remains licensed to the community.
