= Camden and Burlington County Railway =

Overview
- Parent company: Pennsylvania Railroad
- Dates of operation: 1915–1958
- Predecessors: Camden and Burlington County Railroad; Mount Holly, Lumberton and Medford Railroad; Vincentown Branch of the Burlington County Railroad
- Successor: Penndel Company

Technical
- Track gauge: 1,435 mm (4 ft 8 1/2 in)
- Length: 49.26 miles (79.28 km) (maximum)

The Camden and Burlington County Railway was a railway company in the United States. A subsidiary of the Pennsylvania Railroad, it was formed in 1915 from the consolidation of three other companies that owned lines in South Jersey centered on Mount Holly, New Jersey. It was merged into the Penndel Company, a Pennsylvania Railroad holding company, in 1958. Few of its lines exist today.

== History ==
The oldest part of the Camden and Burlington County Railway's network was the original main line of the Burlington and Mount Holly Railroad and Transportation Company, constructed between 1848 and 1863 and running from Burlington, New Jersey, and Pemberton, New Jersey, via Mount Holly, New Jersey. Its successor, Camden and Burlington County Railroad, built west from Mount Holly to Pavonia in 1867, giving it two connections to the Camden and Amboy Railroad main line. The Mount Holly, Lumberton and Medford Railroad and Vincentown Branch of the Burlington County Railroad constructed branches to Medford, New Jersey, and Vincentown, New Jersey, respectively.

The Camden and Burlington County Railway was incorporated on October 4, 1915. Three companies were consolidated to create it: the Camden and Burlington County Railroad; the Mount Holly, Lumberton and Medford Railroad; and the Vincentown Branch of the Burlington County Railroad. The Pennsylvania Railroad, lessor of the previous companies, leased the new company.

The new company constructed no new mileage and abandoned two branches: the Burlington Branch in 1925 and the Vincentown Branch in 1927. The Pennsylvania merged the company into the Penndel Company holding company on January 1, 1958.

== Lines ==
The Camden and Burlington County Railway owned the following lines:

- the Burlington Branch, running 7.12 miles (11.46 km) from Burlington to Mount Holly. Abandoned in 1925.
- the Mount Holly and Medford Branch, running 5.98 miles (9.62 km) from Mount Holly to Medford. Abandoned in 1976.
- the Pemberton Branch, running 22.3 miles (35.9 km) from Pavonia to Pemberton. Partially abandoned in the 1980s and owned by Conrail Shared Assets Operations.
- the Vincentown Branch, running 2.94 miles (4.73 km) from Ewansville to Vincentown. Abandoned in 1927.
