= Bordentown Branch =

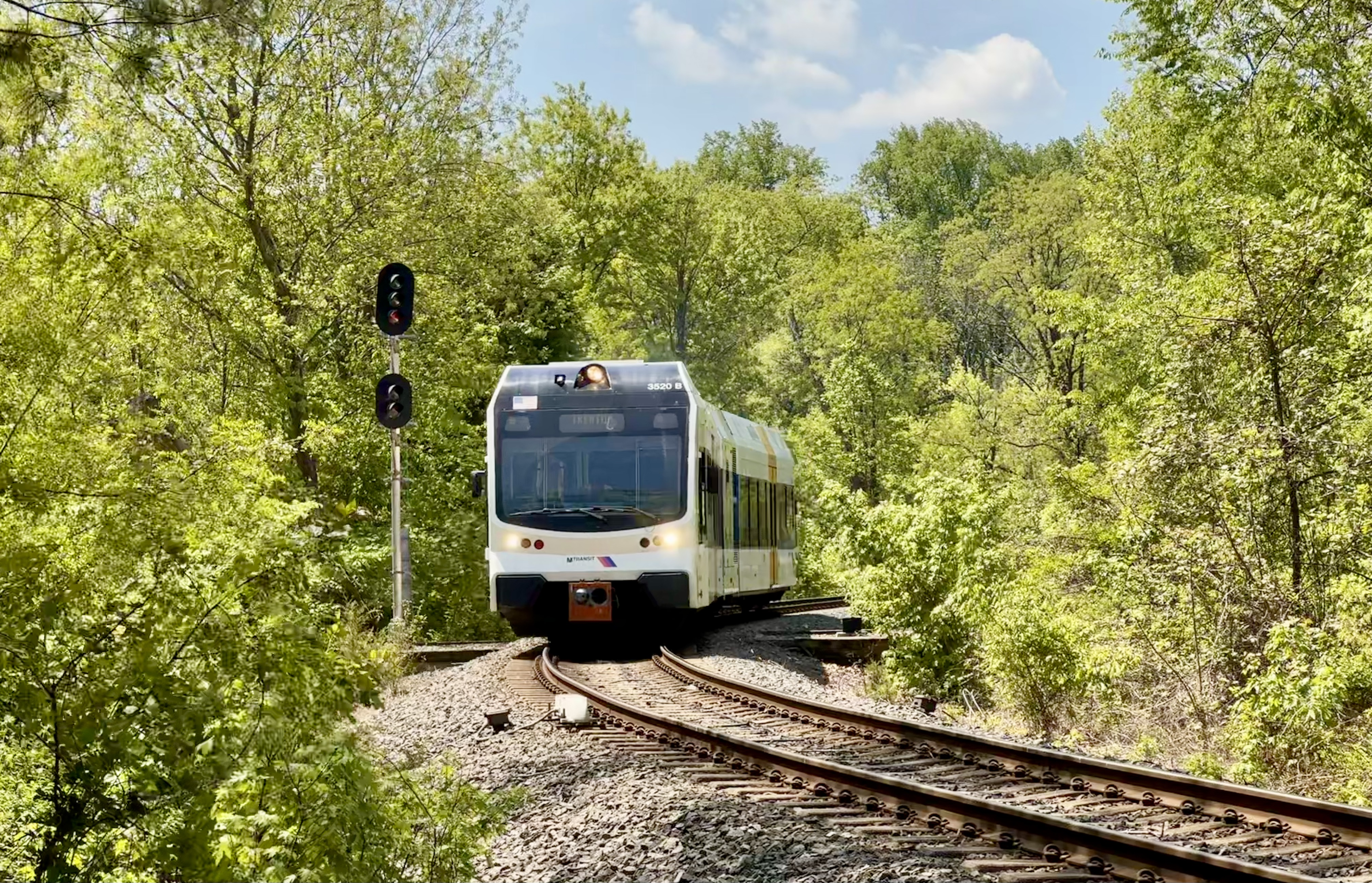
- River Line train in Bordentown

Overview
- Owner: NJ Transit
- Termini: Trenton; Bordentown
- Stations: 4

Service
- Services: River Line
- Operator(s): NJ Transit; Conrail

History
- Opened: January 1838

Technical
- Line length: 6.1 mi (9.8 km)
- Track gauge: 1,435 mm (4 ft 8 1/2 in) standard gauge

The Bordentown Branch is a railway line in the state of New Jersey. It runs between Trenton, New Jersey and Bordentown, New Jersey. It was built in 1837–1838 by the Camden and Amboy Railroad, and as such is one of the oldest railway lines in the United States. It now hosts the northern end of NJ Transit's River Line light rail line. Conrail retains trackage rights for freight operations.

== History ==
The Camden and Amboy Railroad completed its original main line between South Amboy and Camden, New Jersey, in September 1834. From Bordentown, New Jersey, the line followed the east bank of the Delaware River. The Camden and Amboy constructed the Bordentown Branch to connect with the Philadelphia and Trenton Railroad at Trenton, New Jersey. The line, approximately 6 miles (9.7 km) long, opened in January 1838.

The Camden and Amboy was consolidated with the New Jersey Rail Road and Transportation Company and Delaware and Raritan Canal Company in 1872 to form the United New Jersey Railroad and Canal Company. The Pennsylvania Railroad leased this new company from the outset. Although the Camden and Amboy lines became part of the Pennsylvania system, formal ownership remained with the United New Jersey Railroad and Canal Company through the Penn Central merger and bankruptcy.

Passenger service between Trenton and Camden ended on June 28, 1963. The Pennsylvania Railroad and New York Central Railroad merged in 1968 to create Penn Central; Penn Central's bankruptcy two years later led to the creation of Conrail, a government-funded takeover of several failed railroads in the Northeast. The Bordentown Branch was conveyed to Conrail in 1976.

Under Conrail, the line was combined with the Amboy Branch south of Bordentown to form the Bordentown Secondary. Conrail sold the entirety of the Bordentown Secondary to NJ Transit in 1999 for $67.5 million for a planned conversion to light rail operation. Conrail retained trackage rights over the line. The River Line began operation on March 14, 2004, using Stadler diesel-powered light rail vehicles.
