= Farnsworth Avenue Bridge =

- Coordinates: 40.14783°N 74.713083°W
- Carries: Farnsworth Avenue
- Crosses: Former Camden & Amboy Railroad
- Locale: Bordentown, New Jersey

History
- Opened: 1831

The Farnsworth Avenue Bridge is a bridge over the former Camden & Amboy Railroad in Bordentown, New Jersey. It was built in 1831, making it the oldest surviving railway bridge in New Jersey and perhaps the United States.
