= Bordentown station =

Train station in Bordentown, New Jersey

Bordentown
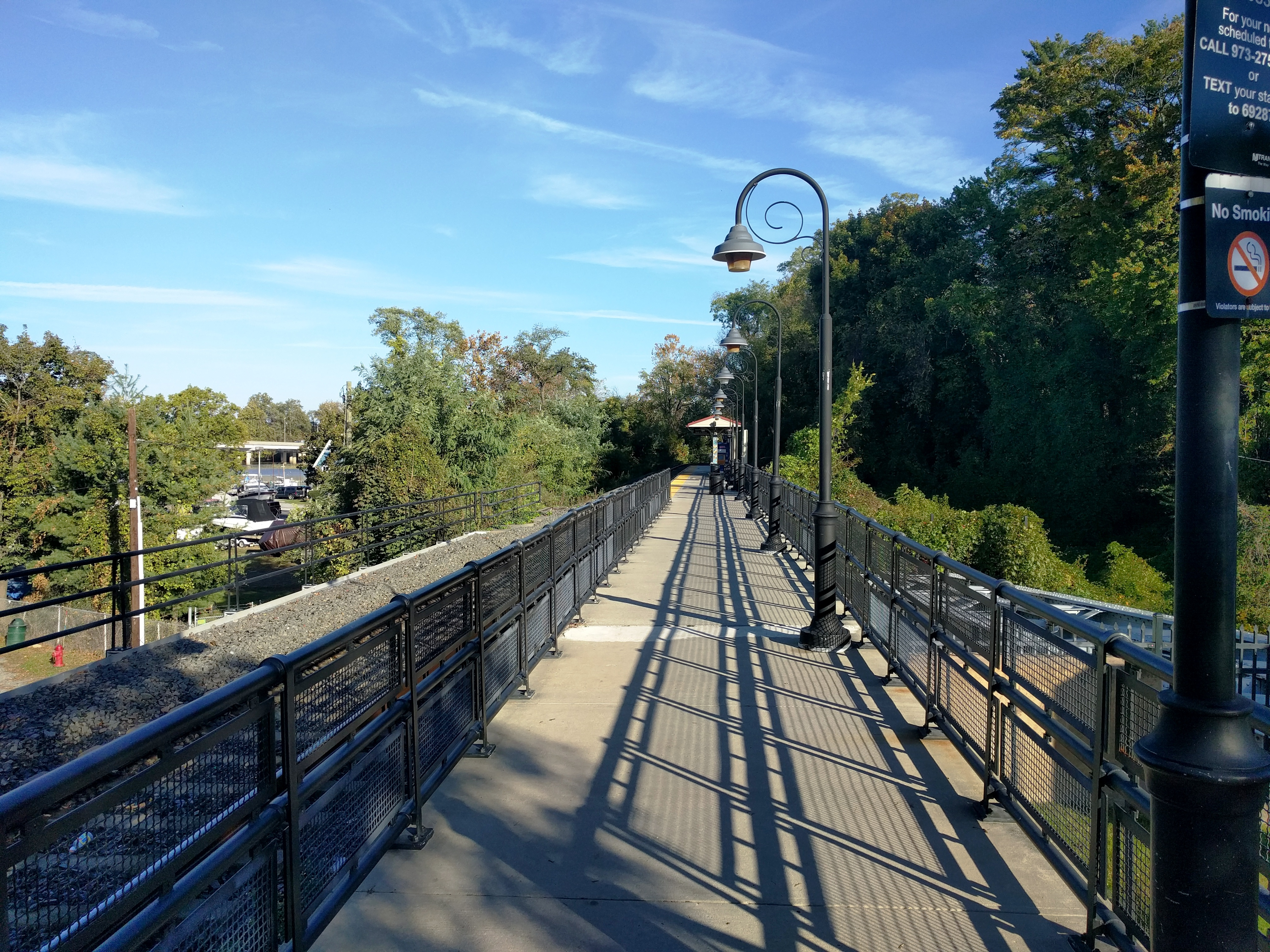
- Station platform and shelter

General information
- Location: 100 West Park Street; Bordentown, New Jersey
- Coordinates: 40°8′54″N 74°42′58″W
- Owner: NJ Transit
- Line: Bordentown Branch
- Platforms: 1 side platform
- Tracks: 1
- Connections: NJ Transit Bus: 409 (stops on U.S. 130)

Construction
- Parking: 183 spaces, 6 accessible spaces
- Accessible: Yes

Other information
- Fare zone: 1

History
- Opened: March 15, 2004

Services
Preceding station	NJ Transit	Following station
Roebling toward Entertainment Center	River Line	Cass Street toward Trenton

Former services
Preceding station	Pennsylvania Railroad	Following station
Terminus	Bordentown Branch	Trenton Terminus
Fieldsboro toward Camden	Amboy Branch	Yardville toward South Amboy
Location

Bordentown station is a station on NJ Transit's River Line light rail system, located on West Park Street in Bordentown, in Burlington County, New Jersey, United States.

== History ==
The Pennsylvania Railroad's Bordentown station lay approximately 500 feet (150 m) south of the current platform, in the southwest corner of the wye where the Amboy and Bordentown Branches met. Service north of Bordentown on the Amboy Branch ended at the end of 1938. Service between Trenton and Camden ended on June 28, 1963.

The station opened on March 15, 2004. Southbound service from the station is available to Camden, New Jersey. Northbound service is available to the Trenton Transit Center with connections to NJ Transit trains to New York City, SEPTA trains to Philadelphia, Pennsylvania, and Amtrak trains. Transfer to the PATCO Speedline is available at the Walter Rand Transportation Center. Transfer to the Atlantic City Line is available at the Pennsauken Transit Center. The station is located on the edge of the Bordentown City Beach and Public Boat Ramp and the Yapewi Aquatic Club.
