= North Pemberton station =

- North Pemberton Railroad Station
- U.S. National Register of Historic Places
- New Jersey Register of Historic Places
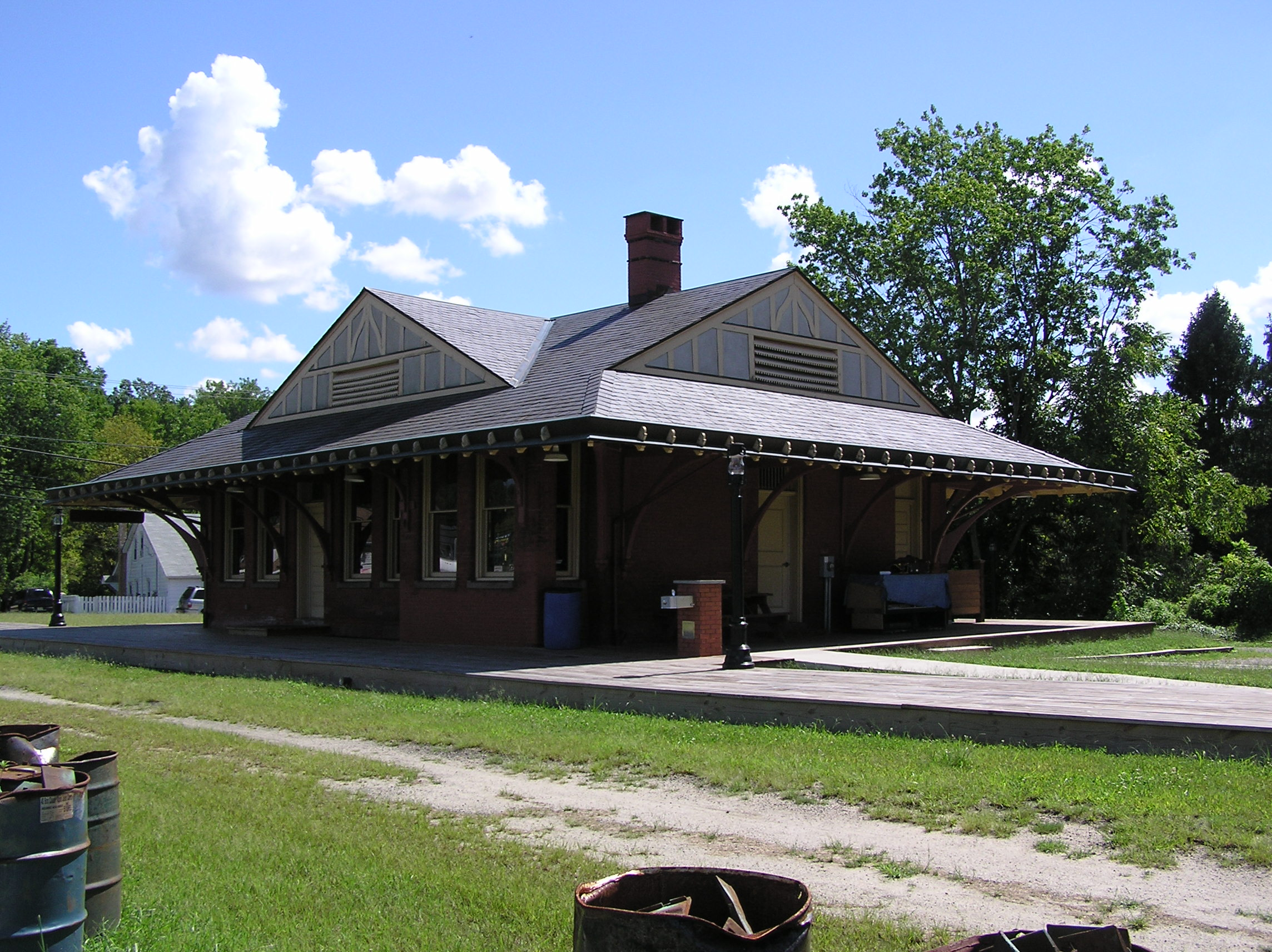

- Location within Burlington County, New Jersey Location within New Jersey Location within the United States
- Location: Hanover Street, Pemberton Township, New Jersey
- Coordinates: 39°58′36″N 74°40′54″W
- Area: 1.5 acres (0.61 ha)
- Built: 1892
- Architect: John S. Rogers
- Architectural style: Queen Anne
- NRHP reference No.: 78001746
- NJRHP No.: 863

Significant dates
- Added to NRHP: May 23, 1978
- Designated NJRHP: December 19, 1977

North Pemberton is a disused railway station located in Pemberton Township, Burlington County, New Jersey, United States. The station was built in 1892 by John S. Rogers and added to the National Register of Historic Places on May 23, 1978, for its significance in architecture and transportation. The station became inactive in 1969 when rail service between Pemberton and Camden ended. The Township of Pemberton now owns the station and operates it as the North Pemberton Railroad Station Museum, a museum of regional history and a Welcome and Information Center for both the Pinelands and the Pemberton area.

The North Pemberton Railroad Station Museum is currently in the process of reopening under the management of the Pemberton Township Historic Trust. Previously, former Pemberton Township Mayor David Patriarca, along with the town council were unable to negotiate a new lease for the site with the Pemberton Township Historic Trust in September 2012.

Preceding station	Pennsylvania Railroad	Following station
Birmingham toward Pavonia	Pemberton Branch	Terminus
Preceding station	Pennsylvania and Atlantic Railroad	Following station
Terminus	Pemberton and Hightstown Railroad	Camp Dix toward Hightstown

== See also ==
- Camden and Amboy Rail Road and Transportation Company
- Operating Passenger Railroad Stations Thematic Resource (New Jersey)
- National Register of Historic Places listings in Burlington County, New Jersey
