= Vincentown Branch of the Burlington County Railroad =

Railroad company in New Jersey

Overview
- Parent company: Burlington County Railroad (1864–1866); Camden and Burlington County Railroad (1866); Camden and Amboy Railroad (1868–1871); Pennsylvania Railroad (1871–1915)
- Dates of operation: 1861–1915
- Successor: Camden and Burlington County Railway

Technical
- Track gauge: 1,435 mm (4 ft 8 1/2 in)
- Length: 2.77 miles (4.46 km)

The Vincentown Branch of the Burlington County Railroad was a railway company in the United States. It was incorporated in 1861 and opened its line in 1864. It was leased in succession by the Burlington County Railroad, Camden and Burlington County Railroad, Camden and Amboy Railroad, and Pennsylvania Railroad. The company was consolidated with the Camden and Burlington County Railroad and Mount Holly, Lumberton and Medford Railroad in 1915 to form the Camden and Burlington County Railway. The Vincentown Branch was abandoned in 1927.

== History ==
In 1860 the Burlington and Mount Holly Railroad and Transportation Company began building east from Mount Holly, New Jersey, to Pemberton, New Jersey. The new line opened on January 1, 1863. The Vincentown Branch of the Burlington County Railroad was incorporated on March 15, 1861, to build a branch from that line from "at or near Charles Ewan's house" (Ewansville, New Jersey) to Vincentown, New Jersey. The line, 2.77 miles (4.46 km) long, opened on May 10, 1864.

The Burlington and Mount Holly Railroad and Transportation Company, since renamed the Burlington County Railroad, leased the Vincentown Branch of the Burlington County Railroad on October 1, 1864. The Camden and Burlington County Railroad assumed the lease on May 2, 1866, but may have ended it on September 30. The Camden and Amboy Railroad leased both companies on April 7, 1868. The Pennsylvania Railroad assumed the leases on December 1, 1871.

An extension of the branch tapped the marl pits of the Vincentown Marl Company, just below Vincentown. This material was in great demand for fertilizer when the branch was constructed, and "marl trains" provided important revenue traffic for the branch. A 19-car marl train originating on the branch, bound for northward points on the Camden and Amboy, suffered a serious accident in Mount Holly, New Jersey on May 21, 1869. A boiler explosion killed the locomotive crew and flung the wrecked locomotive into the North Branch Rancocas Creek.

During the 1890s, dairy production assumed greater importance on the branch. Several platforms were built along the branch so that milk trains could pick up milk for delivery to the city.

The company was consolidated with the Camden and Burlington County Railroad and Mount Holly, Lumberton and Medford Railroad in 1915 to form the Camden and Burlington County Railway. That company abandoned the Vincentown Branch in 1927.
