= Camden, Moorestown, Hainesport and Mount Holly Horse Car Railroad =

Former American railroad company

The Camden, Moorestown, Hainesport and Mount Holly Horse Car Railroad was an American railway company in New Jersey. It was incorporated in 1859 to build a rail line between Camden and Mount Holly, New Jersey. It was consolidated with the Burlington and Mount Holly Railroad and Transportation Company in 1866 to form the Camden and Burlington County Railroad, which ultimately constructed the line from Camden to Mount Holly. Its lines eventually became part of the Pennsylvania Railroad system and are mostly abandoned.

== Background ==
The push for a rail link between Camden and Mount Holly was led by Barclay Haines, a prosperous Quaker merchant who had founded the town of Hainesport, New Jersey, on the South Branch Rancocas Creek, and operated a steamboat line between Hainesport and Philadelphia, Pennsylvania. Mount Holly, a center of population on the North Branch Rancocas Creek, had obtained a somewhat roundabout rail outlet in 1849, via the Burlington and Mount Holly Railroad running north to the Camden and Amboy Railroad. Trains on the latter ran south to Camden and connected with Philadelphia by ferry. The Camden and Amboy enjoyed a state-guaranteed monopoly on rail and canal traffic between New York City and Philadelphia, which it guarded jealously through intense lobbying efforts in the New Jersey Legislature. A line from Camden to Mount Holly could form the nucleus of a competing route through southern New Jersey and was accordingly opposed.

Haines obtained a charter for the Camden, Moorestown, Hainesport and Mount Holly Horse Car Railroad from the legislature on March 15, 1859. The railroad was to begin near Eighth Street in Camden, and then run on or nearly paralleling the Camden and Moorestown Turnpike to Moorestown. From there, it would similarly follow the Moorestown and Mount Holly Turnpike through Hainesport to Mount Holly. (The two turnpikes are now County Route 537.) To appease the Camden and Amboy interests, the railroad was explicitly forbidden to use steam locomotives. The charter rights would expire if the railroad was not completed by July 4, 1864. Political shifts during the American Civil War proved favorable to the project. The conflict between the Camden and Amboy and the Raritan and Delaware Bay Railroad led Radical Republicans to assail the monopoly as a manifestation of states' rights. The Camden and Amboy made peace with Haines, who thereafter became their ally in lobbying the legislature. The charter was extended by the legislature for another year in 1864, and another year in 1865.

No construction work by the company was officially recorded. However, the speed with which the line was completed by its successor (from 1866 to 1867) suggests that surveying and some grading may have been done. On February 6, 1866, the company was merged with the Burlington County Railroad, which had extended the original Burlington and Mount Holly line to Pemberton, New Jersey, to become the Camden and Burlington County Railroad. The Camden and Burlington County proceeded to construct 15.84 miles (25.49 km) of line from the Camden and Amboy at Pavonia (just east of Camden) to a junction with its existing line just south of Mount Holly. It was opened on October 21, 1867, and operated by the Camden and Amboy: the Pavonia to Pemberton line becoming the main line of the Camden and Burlington County. That line became the Pemberton Branch of the Pennsylvania Railroad in 1872; the portion from Pennsauken to Mount Holly survives as the Pemberton Industrial Track of Conrail Shared Assets Operations.
