= Opossum Run Branch =

Former Pennsylvania Railroad line

Overview
- Status: Abandoned
- Owner: Pennsylvania Railroad
- Locale: Pennsylvania, United States
- Termini: New Haven; West Leisenring
- Stations: Trotter, Leisenring, Monarch

Service
- Type: Freight rail
- System: Pennsylvania Railroad

History
- Opened: 1884
- Closed: Early to mid-1900s

Technical
- Character: Former coal and coke transport line

The Opossum Run Branch was a former railroad line constructed by the Pennsylvania Railroad in 1884. It ran from New Haven to West Leisenring, Pennsylvania, through the mining towns of Trotter, Leisenring, and Monarch. The line was abandoned in the early to mid-1900s. Remnants can still be found to this day, most notably in West Leisenring, where a few railroad bridges and a row of coke ovens remain.
