= Mount Holly, Lumberton and Medford Railroad =

Overview
- Dates of operation: 1866–1915
- Successor: Camden and Burlington County Railway

Technical
- Track gauge: 1,435 mm (4 ft 8 1/2 in)
- Length: 5.94 miles (9.56 km)

The Mount Holly, Lumberton and Medford Railroad was a railway company in the United States. It was incorporated in 1866 and opened its line in 1869, at which point it was leased by the Camden and Amboy Railroad. The Pennsylvania Railroad subsequently assumed the lease. The Mount Holly, Lumberton and Medford Railroad was consolidated with the Camden and Burlington County Railroad and Vincentown Branch of the Burlington County Railroad in 1915 to form the Camden and Burlington County Railway. The Mount Holly and Medford Branch was abandoned in 1976.

== History ==
The Burlington and Mount Holly Railroad and Transportation Company had first reached Mount Holly, New Jersey, in 1849. That company built east to Pemberton, New Jersey, in 1863. Its successor, the Camden and Burlington County Railroad, built west to Camden, New Jersey, in 1867.

The Mount Holly, Lumberton and Medford Railroad was incorporated on April 2, 1866. It began building its line between Mount Holly and Medford, New Jersey, in July 1869. The length of the line between the two points was 5.94 miles (9.56 km). The line opened on December 20, 1869, at which point the Camden and Amboy Railroad leased the company. The Camden and Amboy had already leased the Camden and Burlington County Railroad in 1867. The Camden and Amboy was consolidated with two other companies in 1872 to create the United New Jersey Railroad and Canal Company, which was leased by the Pennsylvania Railroad. The Pennsylvania Railroad assumed the lease of the Mount Holly, Lumberton and Medford Railroad.

The company's line between Mount Holly and Medford became the Mount Holly and Medford Branch. The Mount Holly, Lumberton and Medford Railroad was consolidated with the Camden and Burlington County Railroad and Vincentown Branch of the Burlington County Railroad on October 4, 1915, to form the Camden and Burlington County Railway. The Medford and Mount Holly Branch was not conveyed to Conrail in 1976 and was subsequently abandoned.
