= WPRB =

Radio station at Princeton University

- Princeton, New Jersey; United States
- Broadcast area: Central Jersey, South Jersey, Philadelphia
- Frequency: 103.3 MHz (HD Radio)

Programming
- Format: Freeform
- Subchannels: HD2: Radio Mirchi (music of India); HD3: 95.1 WOLD (oldies)

Ownership
- Owner: Princeton Broadcasting Service, Inc.

History
- First air date: December 6, 1940; 85 years ago (campus AM broadcast); November 10, 1955; 71 years ago (FM broadcast)
- Call sign meaning: Princeton Broadcasting Service (owner)

Technical information
- Licensing authority: FCC
- Facility ID: 53567
- Class: B
- ERP: 14,000 watts (analog); 550 watts (digital)
- HAAT: 222 meters (728 ft)
- Transmitter coordinates: 40°16′58.4″N 74°41′9.6″W
- Translators: HD3: 95.1 W236CT (Edison); HD3: 107.9 W300CZ (Ewansville)

Links
- Public license information: Public file; LMS
- Webcast: Listen live
- Website: www.wprb.com; HD3: woldradio.com

WPRB (103.3 MHz) is an FM radio station licensed to Princeton, New Jersey, and owned by Princeton Broadcasting Service, Inc. It broadcasts a freeform radio format, including shoegaze, slowcore, noise music, harsh noise wall, plunderphonics, illbient, jazz, electronic, folk, reggae, ska, metal, world, soul, rap, blues, screamo, and rock. While the station is non-profit, it is licensed as a commercial radio station. It is funded primarily by listener contributions, raised especially during WPRB's annual Membership Drive. It also derives funding through community underwriting contracts with local businesses. Much of the on-air staff and management are Princeton University alumni and students. WPRB's slogan is "New Jersey's Only Radio Station".

The transmitter tower is shared with WKXW "New Jersey 101.5". It is located in Lawrence Township northeast of Trenton. WPRB has an effective radiated power (ERP) of 14,000 watts. It broadcasts using HD Radio technology. The HD2 digital subchannel carries Indian programming and Oldies are heard on its HD3 subchannel.

== History ==
WPRB traces its origins to a campus AM station, WPRU, that launched December 6, 1940. WPRU was founded by H. Grant Theis, a Princeton University student at the time. It often is cited as the oldest commercially licensed campus radio station in the United States. In 1955, WPRU got its FM license. It signed on as WPRB, the first college station on the FM dial in the United States, after the WPRU call sign was found to be already in use by a ship. It is considered a pioneer in FM stereo broadcasting, transmitting a stereo signal beginning in 1964.

WPRB has broadcast on three different FM frequencies in its history: it first was heard on 103.9 MHz; in 1959, it moved to 103.5 MHz; and it moved to its current frequency of 103.3 MHz in 1962. During the 1960s and 1970s, it joined with other Ivy League universities to form the "Ivy Network", sharing some programming and resources. It later was an affiliate of the ABC FM Network.

In 1986, Spin Magazine named WPRB the best commercial college station in the country.

After decades of operation under an advertising-supported business model, in 2006 WPRB switched to a listener-supported model (although it remains a commercially licensed station). In 2009, WPRB went on to acquire a Princeton student magazine, the Nassau Weekly. This partnership concluded in 2024.

One of its disc jockeys, Jon Solomon, has hosted a 24-hour+ Christmas music radiothon every year but one since 1988.

== Broadcast signal ==
WPRB is a full class B signal. Its service contour covers most of Central Jersey and portions of the Philadelphia and New York City radio markets.

WPRB is short-spaced to two other class B stations: WKTU 103.5 KTU (licensed to Lake Success, New York) and WARM-FM Warm 103.3 (licensed to York, Pennsylvania). Since WPRB dates back to the early days of FM broadcasting (before current rules had been adopted) it is grandfathered on its current frequency and power level.

WPRB and WKTU operate on first adjacent channels and the distance between the two stations' transmitters is only 49 miles as determined by Federal Communications Commission rules. The minimum distance between two Class B stations operating on first adjacent channels according to current FCC rules is 105 miles.

WPRB and WARM-FM operate on the same channel and the distance between the two stations' transmitters is only 103 miles. The minimum distance between two Class B stations operating on the same channel according to current rules is 150 miles.

== Translators ==
Call sign	Frequency	City of license	FID	ERP (W)	Class	Transmitter coordinates	FCC info	Notes
W236CT	95.1 FM	Edison, New Jersey	138032	250	D	40°31′45.5″N 74°23′32.2″W	LMS	Relays WPRB-HD3
W300CZ	107.9 FM	Ewansville, New Jersey	141281	100	D	40°24′15″N 74°25′0″W	LMS	Relays WPRB-HD3

== See also ==
- List of community radio stations in the United States
