= West Leisenring, Pennsylvania =

Unincorporated community in Pennsylvania, US

- Unincorporated community
- Location within Pennsylvania
- Coordinates: 39°57′33″N 79°41′55″W
- Country: United States
- State: Pennsylvania
- County: Fayette
- Elevation: 1,047 ft (319 m)
- Time zone: UTC-5 (Eastern (EST))
  - Summer (DST): UTC-4 (EDT)
- ZIP code: 15489
- Area codes: 724, 878
- GNIS feature ID: 1191058

West Leisenring is an unincorporated community in Fayette County, Pennsylvania, United States. The community is 4.2 miles (6.8 km) north of Uniontown. West Leisenring has a post office, with ZIP code 15489, which opened on December 27, 1882.
