= Camden and Burlington County Railroad =

Former railroad company in New Jersey

Overview
- Dates of operation: 1866–1915
- Predecessors: Camden, Moorestown, Hainesport and Mount Holly Horse Car Railroad; Burlington County Railroad
- Successor: Camden and Burlington County Railway

Technical
- Track gauge: 1,435 mm (4 ft 8 1/2 in)
- Length: 29.87 miles (48.07 km)

The Camden and Burlington County Railroad was a railway company in the United States. It was incorporated in 1866, replacing the Camden, Moorestown, Hainesport and Mount Holly Horse Car Railroad and the Burlington County Railroad. The Camden and Burlington County Railroad extended its network by building from Mount Holly, New Jersey, to Pavonia, in the vicinity of Camden, New Jersey. The Camden and Amboy Railroad leased the company in 1867; this was assumed by the Pennsylvania Railroad in 1872. The Camden and Burlington County Railroad was consolidated with the Mount Holly, Lumberton and Medford Railroad and Vincentown Branch of the Burlington County Railroad in 1915 to form the Camden and Burlington County Railway. Of its lines, part of the Pemberton Branch remains.

== History ==
The Burlington County Railroad, incorporated in 1848, had constructed a line from Burlington, New Jersey, to Pemberton, New Jersey, via Mount Holly, New Jersey by 1863. The line connected with the Camden and Amboy Railroad's main line in Burlington. The Camden, Moorestown, Hainesport and Mount Holly Horse Car Railroad, incorporated in 1859, was intended to build westward from Mount Holly to Camden, New Jersey, but did not lay any track.

The Camden and Burlington County Railroad was incorporated on February 6, 1866, consolidating the two companies. The new company built west from Mount Holly to Pavonia (near Camden, New Jersey), also on the Camden and Amboy's main line. This extension was completed on October 21, 1867, at which point the Camden and Amboy leased the Camden and Burlington County Railroad.

The Camden and Amboy was consolidated with two other companies in 1872 to create the United New Jersey Railroad and Canal Company, which was leased by the Pennsylvania Railroad. The Pennsylvania Railroad assumed the lease of the Camden and Burlington County Railroad. The line between Pavonia and Pemberton became the Pemberton Branch, while the line from Mount Holly to Burlington became the Burlington Branch. The Camden and Burlington County Railroad was consolidated with the Mount Holly, Lumberton and Medford Railroad and Vincentown Branch of the Burlington County Railroad on October 4, 1915.

== Lines ==
The Camden and Burlington County Railroad owned approximately 29.87 miles (48.07 km) of main line track. The Burlington Branch, running between Burlington and Mount Holly, was abandoned by the Camden and Burlington County Railway in 1925. The Pemberton Branch, running between Pemberton and Pavonia, was partially abandoned by Conrail between 1981 and 1982. Conrail Shared Assets Operations owns the remainder.
