= United New Jersey Railroad and Canal Company =

American railroad company (1872–1976)

Overview
- Locale: New Jersey and Pennsylvania, U.S.
- Dates of operation: 1872–1976
- Predecessor: Camden and Amboy Railroad; Delaware and Raritan Canal Company; New Jersey Rail Road and Transportation Company
- Successor: Pennsylvania Railroad

Technical
- Track gauge: 4 ft 8 1/2 in (1,435 mm) standard gauge

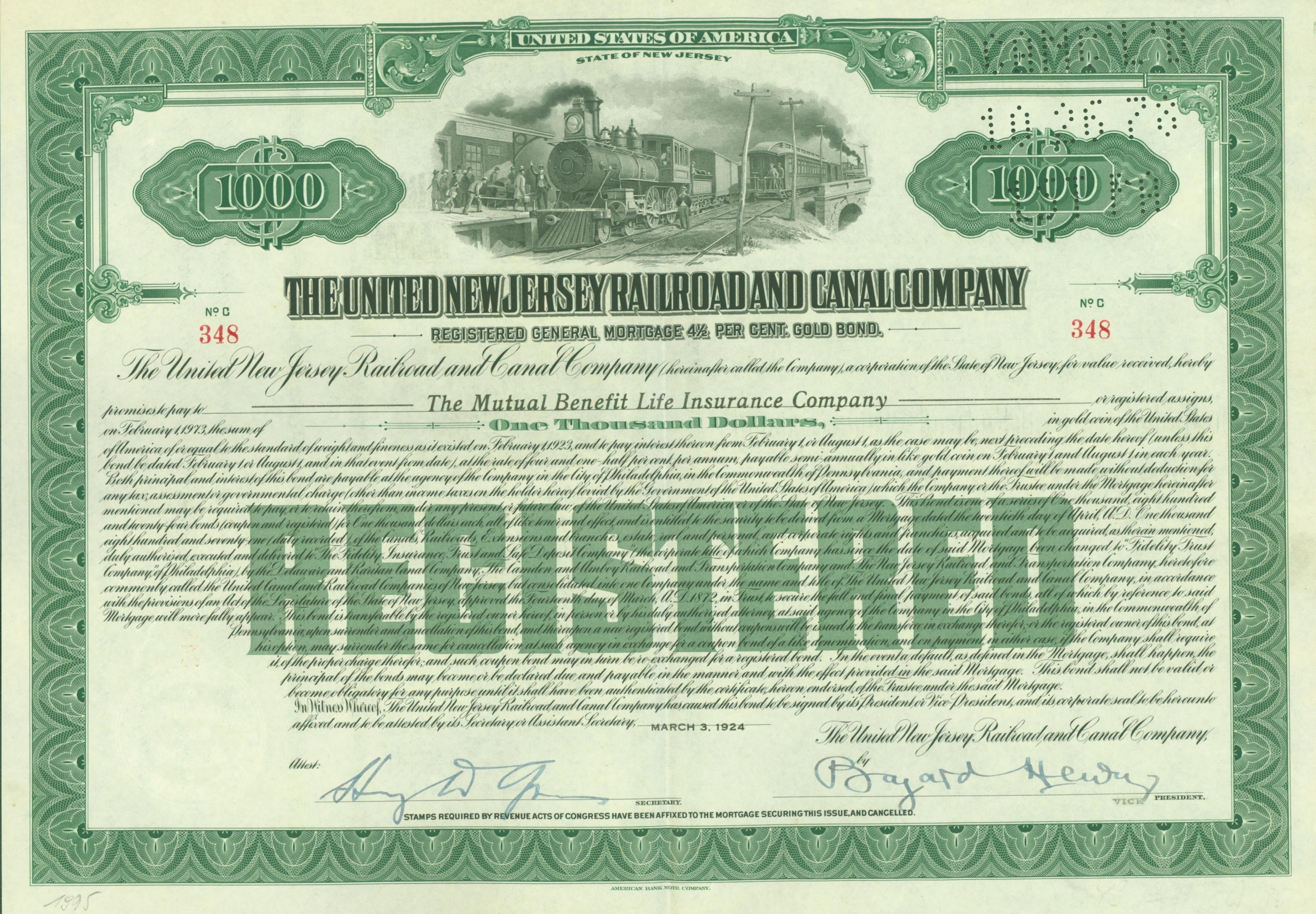
Gold Bond of the United New Jersey Railroad and Canal Company, issued 3 March 1924

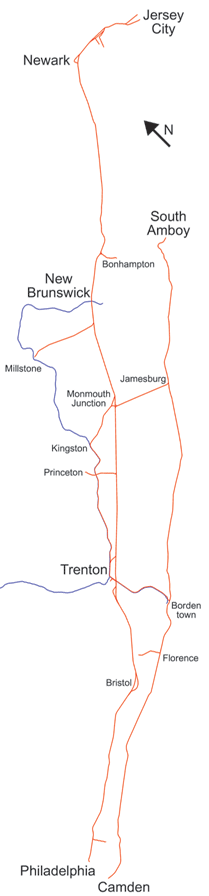
A map of the United New Jersey and Pennsylvania and Trenton Railroads

The United New Jersey Railroad and Canal Company (UNJ&CC) was an American railroad company established in 1872. It was formed by the consolidation of three existing companies: the Camden and Amboy Railroad, Delaware and Raritan Canal Company, and New Jersey Rail Road and Transportation Company. The Camden and Amboy and New Jersey Rail Road were among the earliest North American railroads. The Pennsylvania Railroad leased the United New Jersey Railroad and Canal Company in 1872.

The C&A first purchased and operated the John Bull locomotive, the oldest surviving operable steam locomotive in the world today. It was imported from Great Britain in 1831, and its operations also led to the important development of the iron T-rail type rail tracks that became standard around the world. The canal company, first a competitor and then ally of the C&A, built the Delaware and Raritan Canal. The New Jersey Rail Road and Transportation Company built the first railway line across the New Jersey Palisades.

== History ==
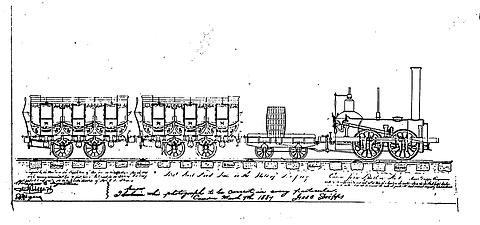
John Bull, circa 1831

The first railroad charter in the United States was issued on February 6, 1815, to the New Jersey Railroad Company. Its proprietors included the famous inventor John Stevens. Based on turnpike charters, it allowed the company to build between New Brunswick and Trenton, and became a model for railroad charters in the future. The Robert Stevens discussed below was the son of John Stevens.

In the early 19th century, travel between New York and Philadelphia, then America's two largest cities, was difficult and expensive. In 1800, a trip between the two cities, by horse, could take as long as eleven hours on a good day and as long as twenty on a bad one. Heavy goods went by boat, around Cape May, New Jersey. In 1829, eager to reduce the cost and difficulty of travel, New Jersey began investigating a cross-state canal and railroads. Railroads had already met with success in Britain and several American cities were planning lines of their own. The legislature, amid very aggressive lobbying, decided to build both a canal and a railroad. The canal and the railroad were to be built parallel to each other and controlled by separate companies chartered by the legislature. Each corporation was to give the state $100,000 worth of stock and pay a transit tax levied on cargo and each passenger carried. The corporation chartered to build the canal complicated this arrangement by deciding to also build a railroad. The legislature responded with a so-called "Marriage Act" to combine the two companies.

=== Camden and Amboy ===
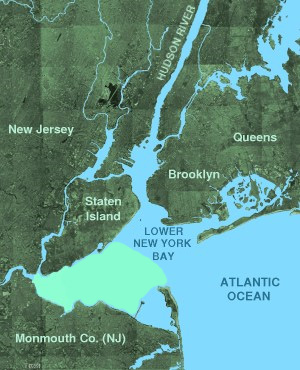
Raritan Bay, located at the southern portion of Lower New York Bay between the U.S. states of New York and New Jersey, is part of the New York Bight. Raritan Bay is shown as the highlighted area south of Lower New York Bay and north of Monmouth County. The bay is bounded on the west by South Amboy, New Jersey, where the Camden and Amboy Railroad (C&A), the nation's first passenger railroad company, had its northern terminus; it connected New York harbor to Philadelphia and Camden.

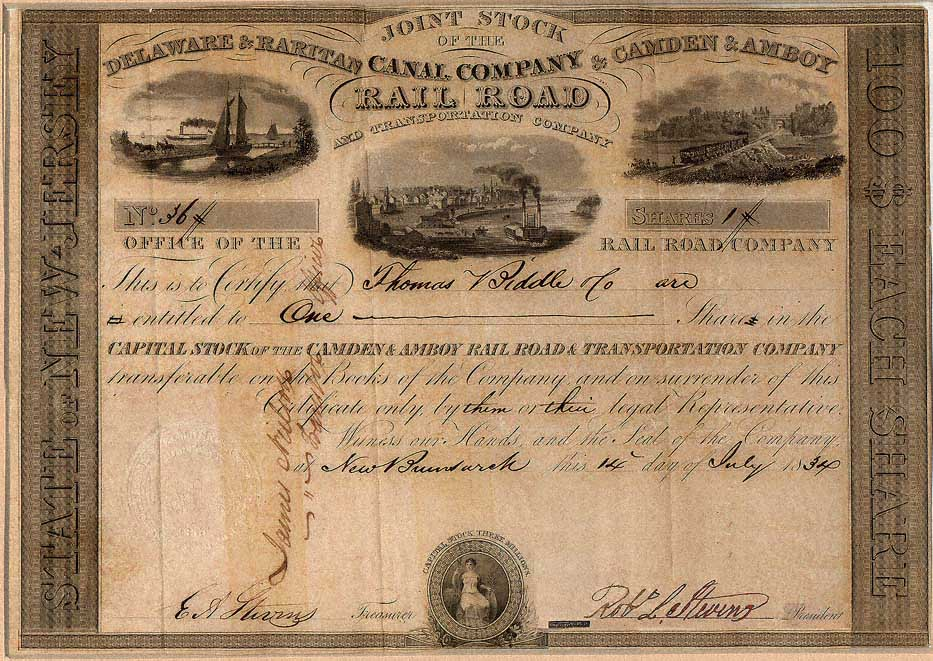
1834 stock certificate of the joint companies signed by President Robert L. Stevens)

The Camden & Amboy Rail Road and Transportation Company (C&A) was chartered on February 4, 1830, the same day as the Delaware and Raritan Canal Company, after the two competing companies had come to a compromise. The C&A and D&R had the same goals: to connect the Delaware River, serving Philadelphia, with the Raritan River for access to New York City by tow-path canal with some new innovations to cross the hills and by the untried railroad technology. Both ventures were considered risky, and both needed right-of-way grants from the legislature along the river's banks, requiring negotiations and design compromises before either could lay claim to a land rights charter.

Subsequently, the D&R was built to the west of the original C&A, leaving the Delaware River at Trenton and running roughly northeast to New Brunswick along the Raritan River valley. From the other direction, the original C&A ran south from New York Harbor via South Amboy on Raritan Bay to Camden, thence across the breadth of New Jersey, connecting by ferry across the Delaware River to Philadelphia, both indirectly and more rapidly linking New York City and Philadelphia, the two largest American cities and industrial centers at the times.

Robert L. Stevens was president of the C&A in the 1830s and 1840s. The C&A was organized on April 28, 1830. Surveys began on June 16. As railroads were a relatively new development in the U.S., rails and locomotives were imported from Britain. Construction began December 4, 1830, at Bordentown on the Delaware River; construction efforts were supported by horse-drawn carriages.

R. Stephenson and Company built a locomotive steam engine for the Camden and Amboy that was completed in July 1831 and shipped to Philadelphia from Liverpool on the 14th of the same month. It was received by "Edwin A. Stephens for the Camden and South Amboy R. Road & Trans Co." The locomotive engine was named John Bull in reference to its place of manufacture. As of 1986, it was the oldest operable locomotive engine. The John Bull arrived at Bordentown on September 4, 1831, and was first tested on November 12. The first section, from Stewarts Point Wharf near Bordentown north to Hightstown, was opened to the public on October 1, 1832, being operated by horse at first.

Service between Philadelphia and Stewarts Point Wharf was provided by steamboats, and a stagecoach trip was used between Hightstown and South Amboy. The trip cost $3 and ran in 9.5 hours, 1–2 hours faster than other routes. The remainder of the line to South Amboy (the current Hightstown Industrial Track) opened on December 17, allowing for the elimination of the stagecoach transfer, but the Delaware froze on December 27, requiring stagecoach operation south of Bordentown. Freight service began on January 24, 1833. Regular locomotive operation by the John Bull began on September 9 of that year. Within two months, a derailment killed two people; this was the earliest recorded train accident involving the death of passengers. In the fall of 1833, the line was extended south to Delanco, and the full line to Camden was completed on December 19, 1834.

The C&A was profitable as soon as it started operations. In 1833, the company grossed about $500,000 but only had $287,000 in expenses.

=== Jersey City–Trenton: 1832–1839 ===
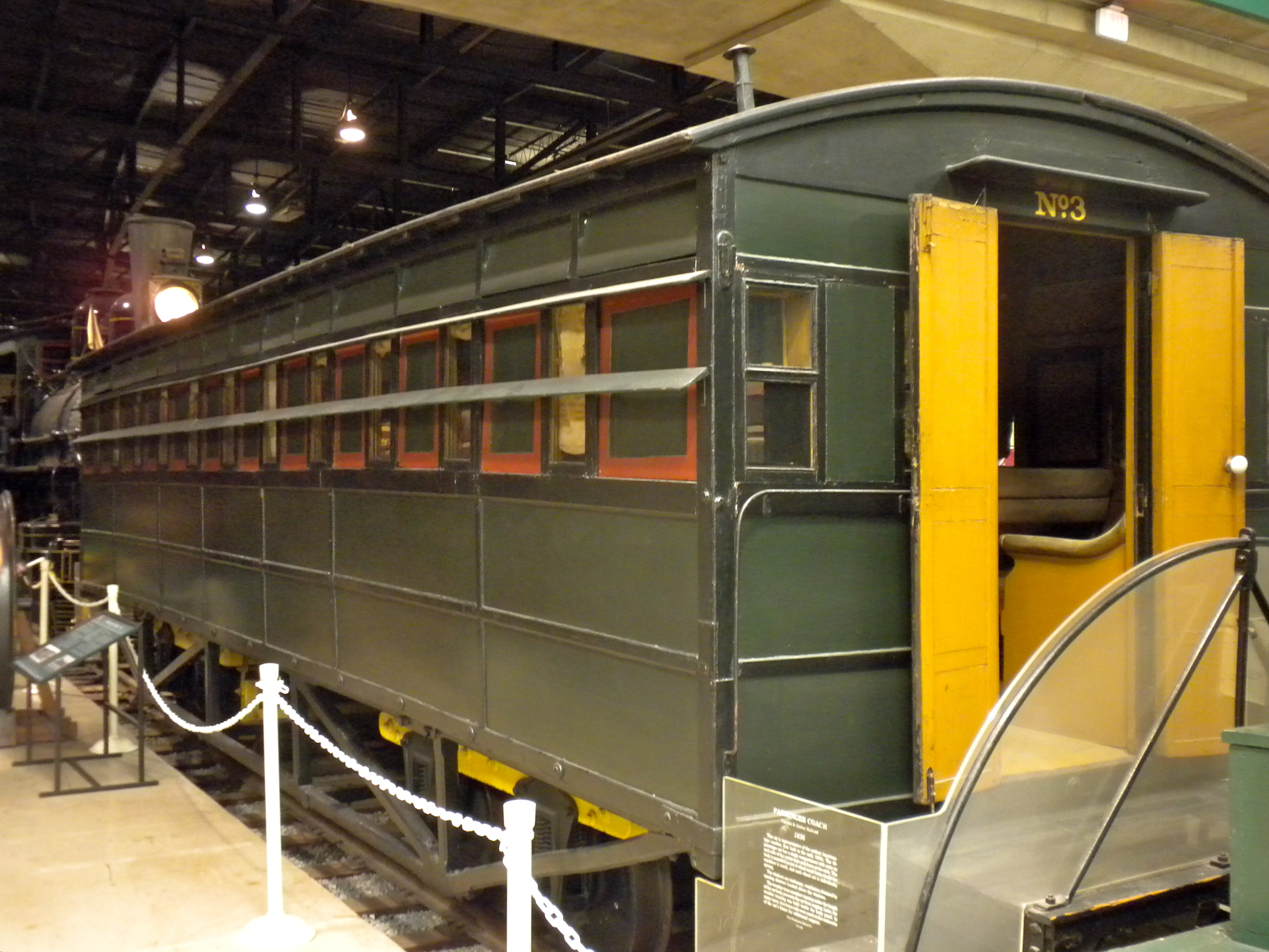
C&A coach #3, built in 1836, was the second oldest passenger coach train in the U.S.

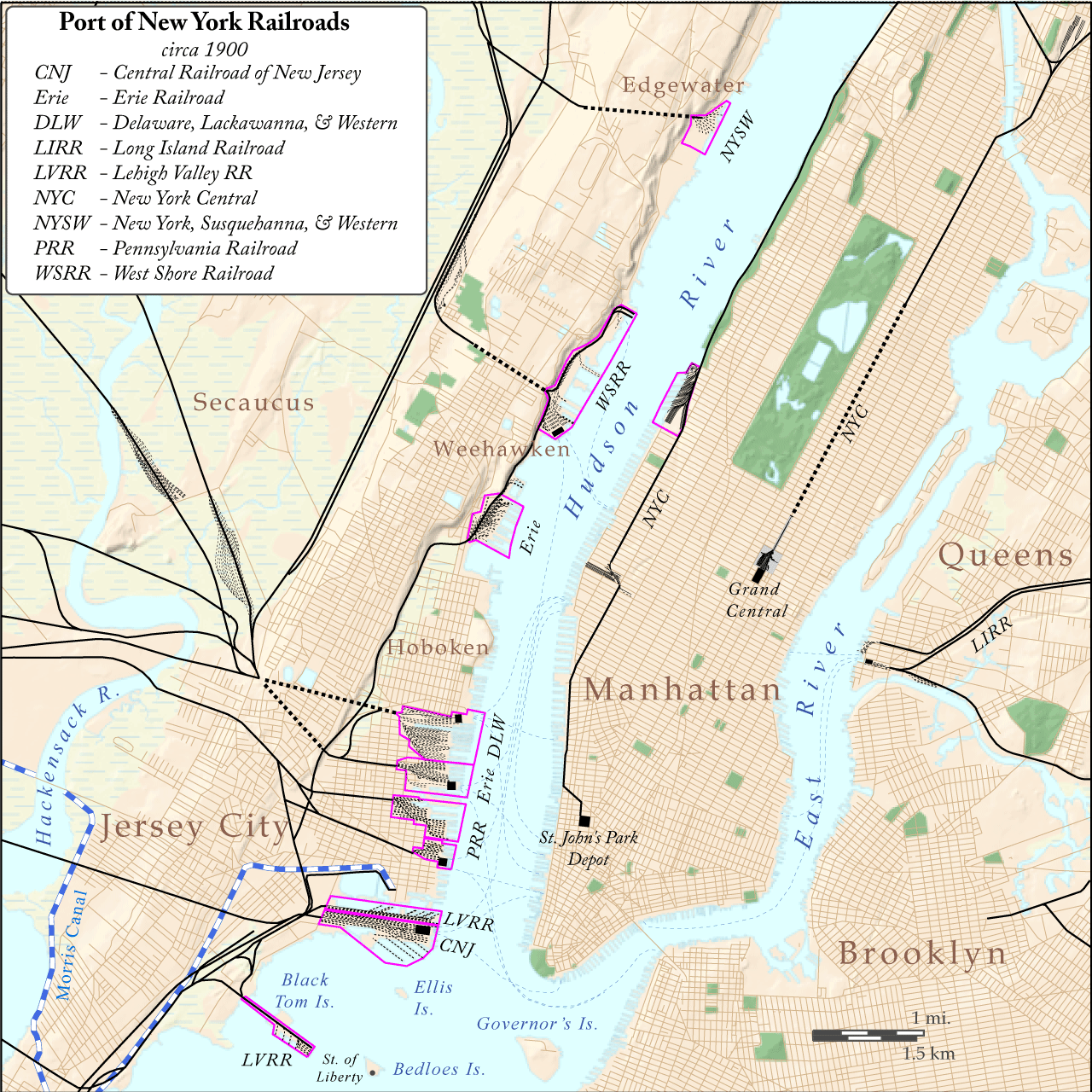
Jersey City terminals, circa 1900

On March 7, 1832, the New Jersey Rail Road and Transportation Company (NJRR) was chartered as a parallel line to the C&A, beginning at Jersey City, closer to New York City, but was limited to building south to New Brunswick due to the C&A's influence; the C&A would build the part from New Brunswick south to Spotswood (changed to Trenton in 1836 due to the alliance with the Philadelphia and Trenton Railroad).

In November 1832, the NJRR acquired control of the Essex and Middlesex Turnpike, which paralleled the planned alignment east of Newark, to avoid problems caused by competition. The stock of the turnpike, running south from Newark to New Brunswick, was bought April 6, 1833; the majority of the line was built directly along the turnpike. The alignment as originally planned crossed the Passaic River on the Centre Street Bridge, then curved south along Park Place and Broad Street directly into the turnpike. A branch would have run from the west end of the bridge south along the river and then southwest to the main line at the south end of Broad Street, but this became the main line and the original plan along Broad Street was never built.

On November 24, 1833, the NJRR bought out the Proprietors of the Bridges over the Rivers Passaic and Hackensack, who had monopolies on their bridges over the Passaic and Hackensack Rivers (on the Newark Turnpike), in order to eliminate their threat. Around 1852, the NJRR acquired the Newark Plank Road and Ferry Company (incorporated 1849) to keep the Passaic and Hackensack monopoly.

Regular NJRR service began September 15, 1834, between Newark and Jersey City, using a temporary track over Bergen Hill. An extension to Elizabeth opened December 21, 1835, using the turnpike from the south end of Broad Street. Service to Rahway began January 1, 1836, again along the turnpike from a point south of Elizabeth. Locomotives were only used south of Newark until January 11, though some horse power operations continued east of Newark. The line opened to east of New Brunswick July 11, with an omnibus transfer the rest of the way; the turnpike was used north of Iselin. On September 8, 1836, the NJRR acquired a majority of stock of the New Brunswick Bridge Company to avoid its local monopoly over crossings of the Raritan River. The double-deck bridge over the Raritan opened October 31, 1837, with a road beneath the railroad, taking the NJRR to New Brunswick. The New Brunswick Bridge Company was authorized to charge a toll on the lower level on May 7, 1838. The old 1795 Albany Street Bridge was removed in 1849 and later rebuilt.

The Bergen Hill Cut, the last part of the Jersey City–New Brunswick line to be finished, opened on January 22, 1838, replacing the old temporary alignment over the hill and ending the use of horse power. On March 15, 1837, a supplement to the C&A's charter was passed, allowing the branch to New Brunswick connecting with the New Jersey Rail Road to branch off of the C&A at Bordentown rather than Spotswood, to pass through Trenton for a connection with the Trenton Delaware Bridge and the Philadelphia & Trenton Railroad. Portions could be built next to the Delaware and Raritan Canal or along the New Brunswick and Trenton Turnpike.

Construction on the branch began in September 1837 between Bordentown and Trenton, where it was built on the east bank of the D&R Canal. The initial branch opened April 4, 1838. Construction on the extension to New Brunswick began June of that year, opening January 1, 1839. The branch continued northeast from Trenton on the east bank of the canal, splitting at Kingston and running cross-country to Millstone Junction, southwest of New Brunswick. That same day, the NJRR was completed from New Brunswick to Millstone Junction. Despite forming one third of the route, the NJRR only got one sixth of the earnings from the joint operation, which ran between Philadelphia and New York City in 5.5 hours.

=== Further connections and realignments: 1839–1867 ===
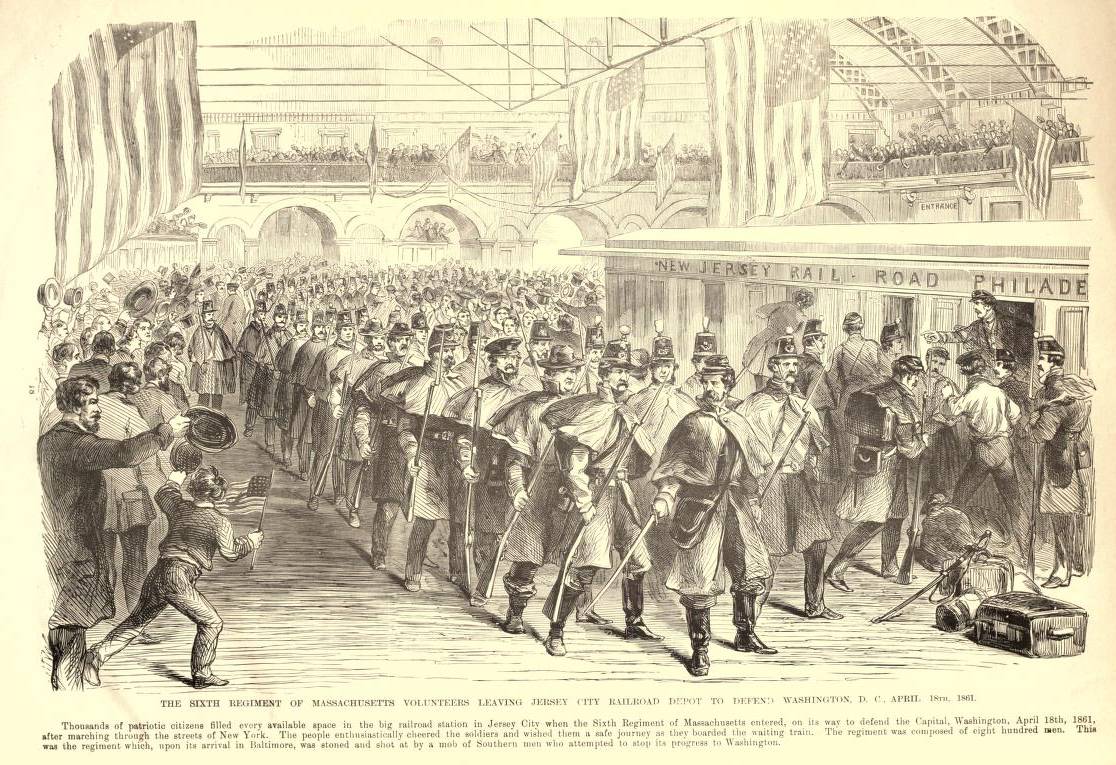
The 6th Massachusetts Militia Regiment departing Jersey City to defend the national capital of Washington, D.C. on April 18, 1861

By 1839, a connection opened between the Philadelphia & Trenton Railroad and the C&A's Trenton Branch, including a bridge over the Delaware and Raritan (D&R) Canal in Trenton. This allowed for through Philadelphia–Jersey City operation, but most traffic continued to run via Camden due to the distance between the P&T's Kensington terminal and central Philadelphia.

On May 31, 1854, the C&A decided to realign and straighten the Trenton Branch between Trenton and Deans Pond near Monmouth Junction due to bad soil conditions on the bank of the D&R Canal. A plank road, later upgraded to a railroad branch, would be built to connect to Princeton, which the new alignment would bypass. A tunnel under the canal in Trenton was completed in March 1860, for the connection between the P&T Railroad and the new alignment. Construction on the new line began October 1862; the Clinton Street Station on the new line at Trenton opened April 20, 1863, replacing the old State Street Station. The first train ran through the new tunnel on October 5, 1863, and the new line (along what is now the Northeast Corridor) opened November 23, cutting New York City–Trenton time to 2.5 hours. The second track on the new line opened September 1864, but the old line remained for southbound freight. The Princeton Branch opened May 29, 1865, on which date passenger trains stopped running over the old line. The old line was removed between Trenton and Princeton in July; a portion in Trenton was kept to serve businesses. The Princeton–Kingston section was removed in September when freight operations began on the Princeton Branch; track north of Kingston (which was not next to the canal) was retained to serve the Rocky Hill Railroad.

=== Competition ===
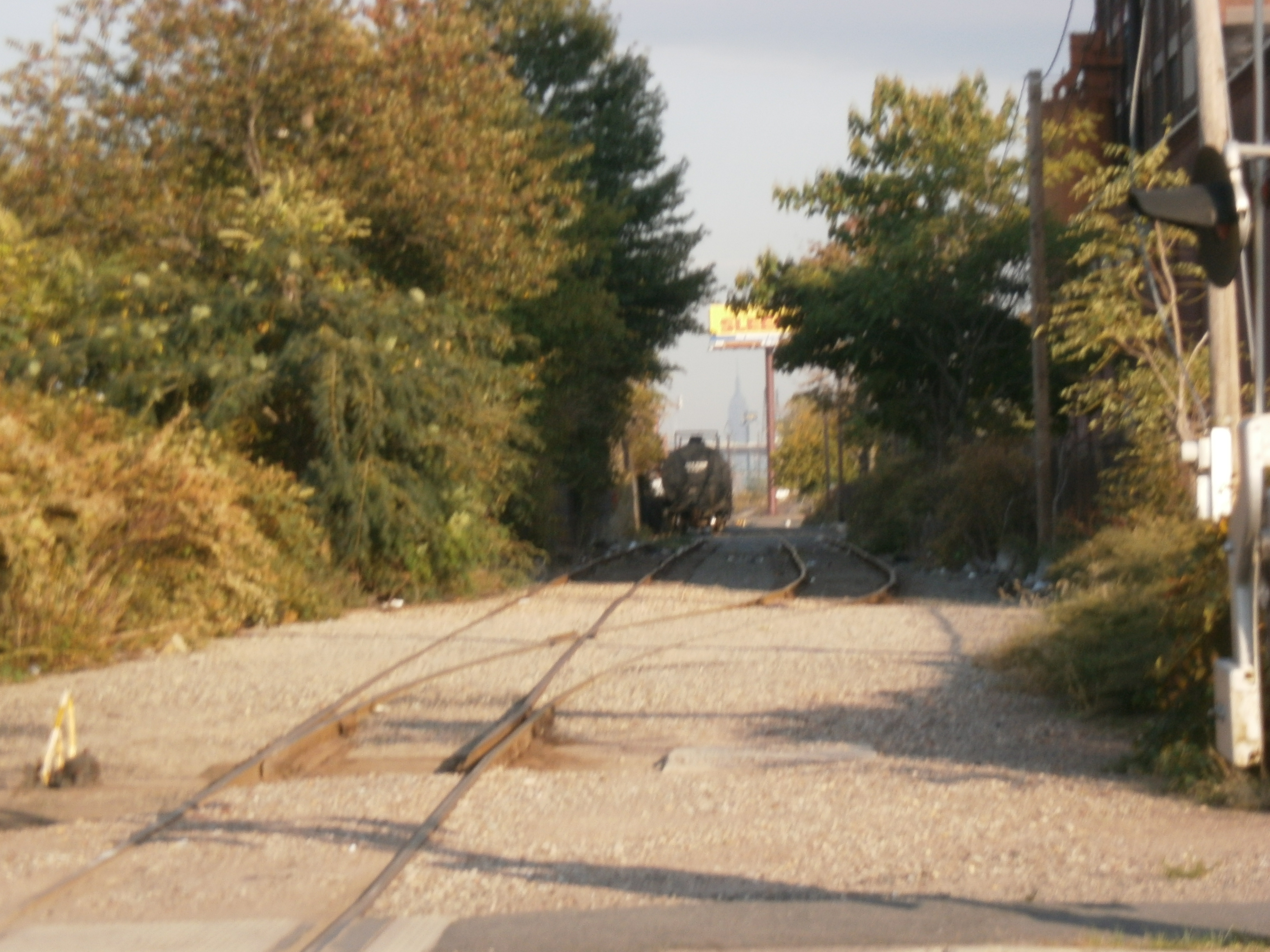
Original alignment from Newark crossing the Passaic River on the Centre Street Bridge to Harrison

Closely tied to the early NJRR was the Paterson and Hudson River Railroad (P&HR), later the main line of the Erie Railroad. The P&HR agreed in June 1833 to build to the west side of the New Jersey Palisades at Marion Junction, where it would use the NJRR's Bergen Hill Cut the rest of the way to the Hudson River. The P&HR opened November 29, 1833, prior to the opening of any part of the NJRR, in the meantime using a stagecoach along the Newark Turnpike to reach the river. A trackage rights agreement was made October 10, 1834, and P&HR operation to Jersey City began October 20. The Long Dock Tunnel opened April 15, 1861, giving the P&HR (by then part of the Erie) its own route to the Hudson River.

Also involved with the NJRR was the Morris and Essex Railroad (M&E), later the Delaware, Lackawanna and Western Railroad's (DL&W) main line. On October 21, 1836, the NJRR agreed to carry M&E traffic between Newark and Jersey City, beginning on November 19. A new alignment meeting the NJRR in Harrison opened August 5, 1854. On October 14, 1863, the M&E began using the Long Dock Tunnel.

The Central Railroad of New Jersey (CNJ) also used the NJRR to reach Jersey City from Elizabeth until its own line opened on August 1, 1864.

The C&A often used legislative and legal means to protect its monopoly on New York City to Philadelphia travel. The monopoly was finally broken on May 1, 1876, with the completion of the National Railway, over seven years after the legal monopoly expired.

On January 19, 1831, New Jersey passed a supplement to the D&R Canal's charter, allowing them to build a railroad alongside their canal. However, this was soon mooted by the union between the C&A and D&R. On February 15, 1831, the C&A and D&R were combined as the Joint Companies, with all important decisions made by a Joint Board, and all stock was consolidated.

An act passed February 4, 1831, gave the C&A monopoly powers for nine years against railroads built within three miles of the C&A, in exchange for the state receiving 1000 shares of stock. The Protection Act, passed March 2, 1832, expanded this to give the Joint Companies a monopoly on New York City-Philadelphia traffic across New Jersey. On March 16, 1854, this exclusive right was extended to January 1, 1869, as long as the C&A helped other railroads including the West Jersey Railroad and double-tracked its main line.

In Summer 1835, Robert F. Stockton bought control of the Trenton Delaware Bridge and Philadelphia and Trenton Railroad to end its competition with the C&A and the legal battle to connect at New Brunswick with the NJRR. On October 12 the C&A/D&R Joint Board authorized a purchase of the P&T, and an agreement was signed November 11, by which the P&T would send all traffic beyond Trenton to New York City via the C&A. A pro-C&A board was elected by the P&T on January 12, 1836, and on June 1 the stock of all three companies was divided pro rata.

On September 1, 1862, a competing line began operating via the Raritan and Delaware Bay Railroad and Camden and Atlantic Railroad, running steamboats between New York City and Port Monmouth at the north end of the R&DB. This common threat caused the C&A and NJRR to work more closely, signing an agreement October 1. The Newark and New York Railroad, later part of the Central Railroad of New Jersey, opened in July 1869, giving major competition to the NJRR from Newark east.

=== PRR lease ===
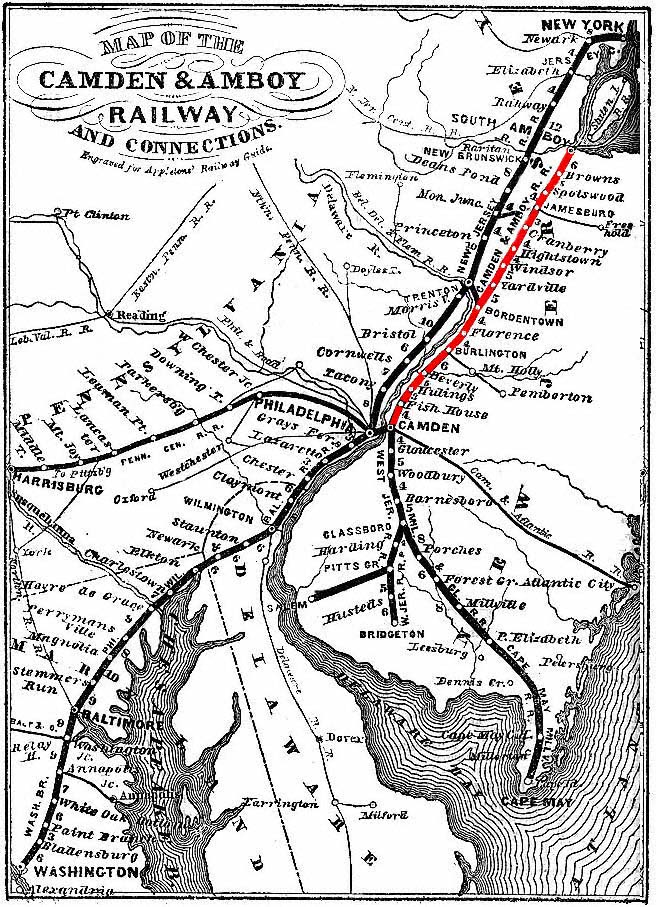
A map of the Camden & Amboy Railway and associated lines, showing the old alignment that operated north from Trenton until May 29, 1865

On February 1, 1867, the C&A and NJRR were informally joined as the United New Jersey Railroad and Canal Companies (UNJ). The Pennsylvania Railroad (PRR) approved a lease of the UNJ on May 15, 1871, and the UNJ approved May 19. On May 18, 1872, the C&A, D&R Canal and NJRR were consolidated, forming the United New Jersey Railroad and Canal Company. The new company was split into two divisions: the New York Division consisted of the NJRR and the C&A Trenton Branch towards Philadelphia, while the Amboy Division was the original C&A main line.

In 1968, the PRR merged with the New York Central Railroad, to form the Penn Central. A series of events including inflation, poor management, abnormally harsh weather conditions and the withdrawal of a government-guaranteed 200-million-dollar operating loan forced the Penn Central to file for bankruptcy protection in 1970. The Penn Central operated under court supervision until 1976, when the Northeast Corridor rail line was transferred to Amtrak for use in passenger service, and the remaining lines were transferred to Conrail. Initially Conrail operated commuter rail service on its lines under contract to the New Jersey Department of Transportation. In 1979, the commuter lines were acquired by New Jersey Transit.

== Other branches ==
- Burlington and Mount Holly Railroad and Transportation Company opened in 1849, providing a branch from Burlington southeast to Mount Holly. From opening it was controlled by the C&A.
- Belvidere Delaware Railroad, also controlled by the C&A, opened in stages from 1851 to 1855, running north from Trenton to Belvidere. The BDRR was leased to the UNJ on January 1, 1876.
- Freehold and Jamesburg Agricultural Railroad opened in 1853 from the C&A at Jamesburg east to Freehold, also under C&A control. In January 1866, a connecting line opened between the new Trenton Branch at Monmouth Junction and the original main line at Jamesburg. That line, built under the F&J charter, was transferred to the United New Jersey Railroad and Canal Company on July 29, 1874. A July 16, 1879 agreement leased the F&J to the UNJ from June 1, 1879.
- Millstone and New Brunswick Railroad, opened in 1854, running west from the south end of the NJRR at Millstone Junction to Millstone. The M&NB was bought on April 21, 1915 at foreclosure.
- Bonhampton opened in 1860
- Perth Amboy and Woodbridge Railroad, operated by the NJRR, opened in 1864 as a branch from Rahway south to Perth Amboy. A June 26, 1889 agreement leased the PA&W to the UNJ from January 1, 1891.
- Rocky Hill Railroad and Transportation Company, opened in 1864 as a branch of the C&A from Kingston on the old alignment north to Rocky Hill. The C&A leased it November 22, 1869 and began operating it June 1, 1870.
- Camden and Burlington County Railroad running east from Camden to Mount Holly, opened in 1867 under C&A operation. In 1868 the C&A leased the Vincentown Branch of the Burlington County Railroad, and soon after formally leased the C&BC.
- Pemberton and Hightstown Railroad opened from the C&A at Hightstown south to Pemberton in 1868, under lease and operation by the C&A.
- NJRR was authorized to acquire underwater land at Harsimus Cove on March 30, 1868. That land became a major freight terminal, served by the Harsimus Branch.
- Mount Holly, Lumberton and Medford Railroad opened in 1869 under C&A lease, running south from Mount Holly to Medford.
- In April 1870, a new direct line opened across the Passaic River bypassing the Centre Street Bridge. The old bridge remained for freight and to serve downtown. Included in the new line was a new station at Market Street, now Newark Penn Station.
- Columbus, Kinkora and Springfield Railroad was leased March 11, 1871. The Mercer and Somerset Railroad was leased October 1, 1871.
- In 1872, a short branch was built at Florence to serve a foundry on the Delaware River.
- In 1876, the Millham Branch opened, connecting the old and new alignments northeast of Trenton.

== Current ==
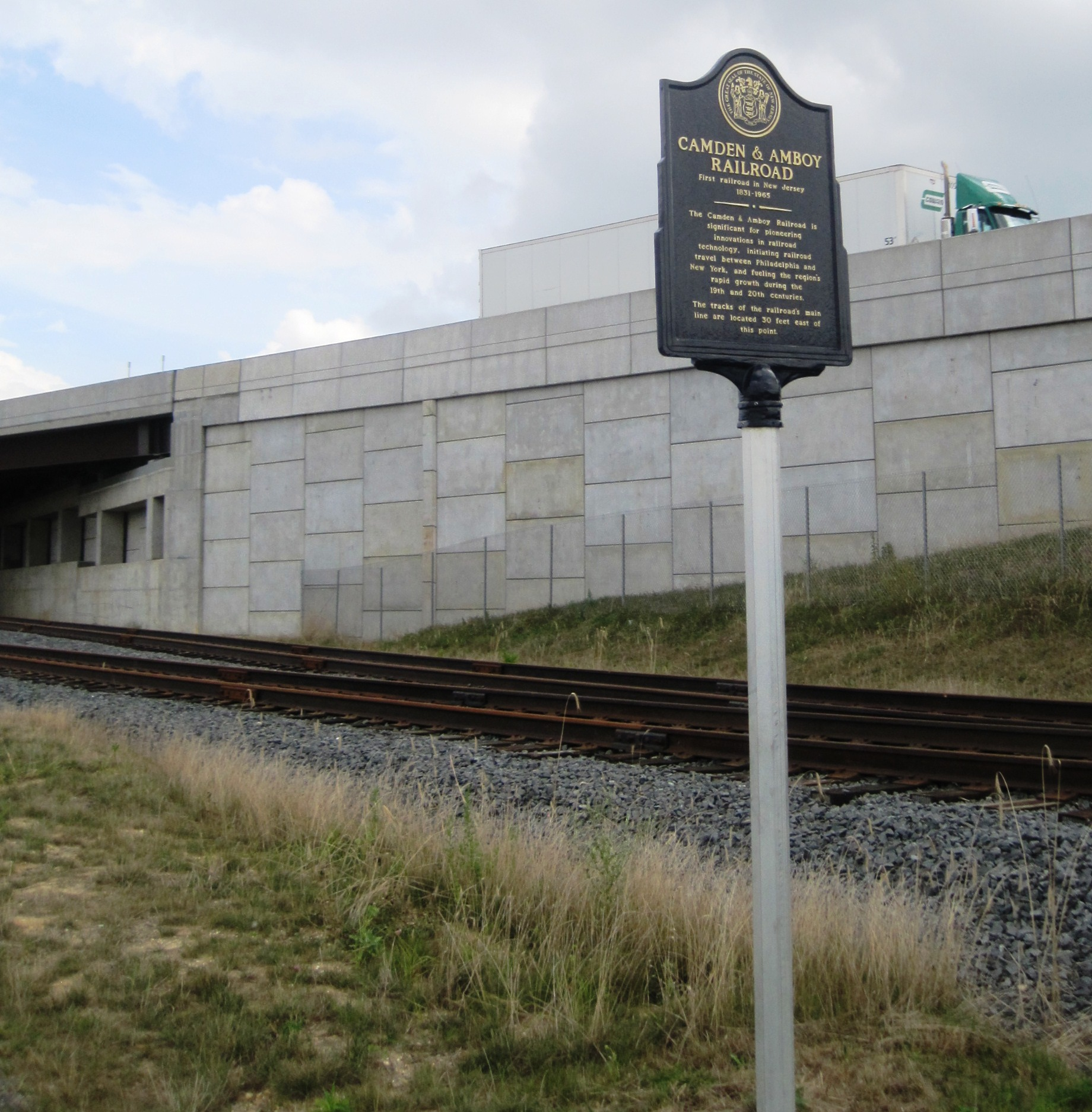
Historical marker signifying the Camden & Amboy Railroad in Cranbury

Until 1999, the original C&A alignment and the Trenton Branch from Pavonia Yard to Trenton was labeled as Conrail's Bordentown Secondary. It is presently operating as New Jersey Transit's RiverLINE, a Diesel multiple unit light rail transit line. Freight trains operate overnight under a Federal Railroad Administration waiver. The remaining portion of the Trenton Branch is part of Amtrak's Northeast Corridor.

The original line from Bordentown heading north to Robbinsville is operated by Conrail Shared Assets as the Robbinsville Industrial Track. The line ceased being a through route in 1967 when the PRR severed trackage between Windsor-Hightstown. Conrail abandoned the Hightstown-Cranbury segment in late 1982; additional trackage between Windsor-Robbinsville was dismantled in 2011 by Conrail Shared Assets. Conrail Shared Assets operates the line north of Cranbury to South Amboy via Jamesburg.

The Princeton Branch is still used by New Jersey Transit for passengers. The old alignment in Trenton is still used for freight; the old alignment from Rocky Hill to Monmouth Junction was abandoned in 1983 by Conrail, and the Rocky Hill Branch was obliterated by Conrail for the use of a rail trail along the D&R Canal. However, the Florence Branch still exists.

For 49 miles east from Trenton to the Manhattan Transfer station the line is part of the Northeast Corridor; from there east to the east side of the Palisades PATH and Conrail's Passaic and Harsimus Line occupy the right-of-way, side by side. East of the Palisades, the elevated structure to Exchange Place Terminal has been largely torn down, as has the elevated structure to Harsimus Cove (with the exception of the Harsimus Stem Embankment), but PATH follows the alignment of the former underground.

== See also ==
- History of rail transport in the United States
