= New Jersey Rail Road and Transportation Company =

Railway company in New Jersey

Overview
- Locale: New Jersey
- Dates of operation: 1832–1872
- Founder: John Stevens III
- Successor: United New Jersey Railroad and Canal Company

Technical
- Track gauge: 4 ft 10 in (1,473 mm)
- Track length: 38.48 miles (61.93 km)

The New Jersey Rail Road and Transportation Company was an early railroad company in the state of New Jersey. It was incorporated in 1832 and opened its first line in 1834, making it one of the oldest railroads in North America. It was consolidated with the Camden and Amboy Railroad and the Delaware and Raritan Canal Company in 1872 to form the United New Jersey Railroad and Canal Company, which was later leased by the Pennsylvania Railroad. Today, its former main line operates as two separate rail roads. The section between Jersey City and Newark is part of PATH's Newark–World Trade Center line and the section between Newark and New Brunswick, is part of Amtrak's Northeast Corridor.

== History ==
The state of New Jersey had chartered Camden and Amboy Railroad and Delaware and Raritan Canal Company in 1830 to develop a connection between Philadelphia and New York City. The two companies, though remaining independent, agreed to cooperate and became known as the "Joint Companies." The Camden and Amboy opened between South Amboy, and Bordentown (near Trenton), in 1832, and extended south to Camden in 1834. The canal opened between Bordentown and New Brunswick the same year. Steamboats operated between South Amboy and New York, and between Bordentown and Philadelphia. The Protection Act, passed in 1832, "prohibit[ed] any other railroad from building within three miles of the Camden & Amboy's termini."

The New Jersey Rail Road and Transportation Company was incorporated on March 7, 1832, to build a line from Jersey City, to New Brunswick. The legislature specified that the line was to handle local traffic only. The line opened between Jersey City and Newark, on September 15, 1834. It was further extended to Elizabeth in 1835 and Rahway and the shore of the Raritan River across from New Brunswick, in 1836. The Raritan was finally bridged in 1837. The completion of the Camden and Amboy 's branch line from Trenton to New Brunswick on January 1, 1839, created the first through route between Philadelphia and New York City.

Although the company's charter authorized it to construct bridges over the Passaic and Hackensack Rivers, this provision conflicted with a 1790 New Jersey statue granting exclusive rights over the same to "The Proprietors of the Bridges over the Rivers Passaic and Hackensack", who had constructed bridges over those rivers in 1795. The railroad resolved the issue by taking stock control of the bridge company. The company took control of the Newark Turnpike Company for similar reasons.

New Jersey Rail Road, Camden and Amboy Railroad, and Delaware and Raritan Canal Company moved to a closer association in 1867 when they created a joint board of directors. This was known as the "United Companies", although all three companies continued to be independent. A formal consolidation into the United New Jersey Railroad and Canal Company followed in 1872; the Pennsylvania Railroad leased the new company from the outset.

== Branches ==
Beyond its main line between Jersey City and New Brunswick, the New Jersey Rail Road constructed three small branches:

- the Bonhamtown Branch, running 1.82 miles (2.93 km) south from Metuchen, New Jersey.
- the Center Street Branch, running 1.34 miles (2.16 km) from Newark to Harrison. This was the original crossing of the Passaic River in Newark, and was retained after the line was realigned in 1869.
- the Harsimus Branch, running 1.47 miles (2.37 km) from Jersey City to Harsimus Cove.
