= Pemberton Branch =

Overview
- Owner: Conrail Shared Assets Operations

History
- Opened: January 1, 1863

Technical
- Line length: 22.3 mi (35.9 km)
- Track gauge: 1,435 mm (4 ft 8 1/2 in) standard gauge

The Pemberton Branch is a railway line in the U.S. state of New Jersey. At its fullest extent it ran 22.3 miles (35.9 km) from Pavonia, near Camden, to Pemberton Township. The current line runs from a junction with the Atlantic City Line in Pennsauken Township to Mount Holly. The line was built by the Burlington and Mount Holly Railroad and Transportation Company and its successor the Camden and Burlington County Railroad between 1863 and 1867. It eventually became part of the Pennsylvania Railroad's network and is now owned by Conrail Shared Assets Operations.

== History ==
The Burlington and Mount Holly Railroad and Transportation Company completed its original line between Burlington, and Mount Holly on June 18, 1849. At the northern end, the line connected with the main line of the Camden and Amboy Railroad. On January 1, 1863, the company built another 6.5 miles (10.5 km) east to Pemberton Township.

The Burlington and Mount Holly Railroad was consolidated with the Camden, Moorestown, Hainesport and Mount Holly Horse Car Railroad on May 2, 1866, to form the Camden and Burlington County Railroad. The new company built west from Mount Holly to Pavonia (near Camden), also on the Camden and Amboy's main line. This extension was completed on October 21, 1867, at which point the Camden and Amboy leased the Camden and Burlington County Railroad.

The Pemberton and Hightstown Railroad built north from Pemberton to Hightstown, between 1867 and 1868. Between 1870 and 1871, the Pemberton and New York Railroad built a line that branched off from the Camden and Burlington County Railroad's line just west of Pemberton and ran east to Whitings. This line reached the Atlantic coast in 1881 under the Philadelphia and Long Branch Railway.

The Camden and Amboy was consolidated with two other companies in 1872 to create the United New Jersey Railroad and Canal Company, which was leased by the Pennsylvania Railroad. The Pennsylvania Railroad assumed the lease of the Camden and Burlington County Railroad. The line between Pavonia and Pemberton became the Pemberton Branch, while the line from Mount Holly to Burlington became the Burlington Branch.

Passenger service on the line ended on April 25, 1969. The line was conveyed to Conrail in 1976 following the Penn Central's bankruptcy. Conrail abandoned the section between Pavonia and Pennsauken in 1981 and between Pemberton and Mount Holly in February 1982. Conrail Shared Assets Operations owns the remaining portion between Pennsauken and Mount Holly, which it calls the Pemberton Industrial Track.
