= Philadelphia and Trenton Railroad =

The Philadelphia and Trenton Railroad was a railroad from Philadelphia, Pennsylvania to Trenton, New Jersey. Opened in 1832, it became part of the Pennsylvania Railroad system in 1871. The majority of it is now part of Amtrak's Northeast Corridor.

== History ==
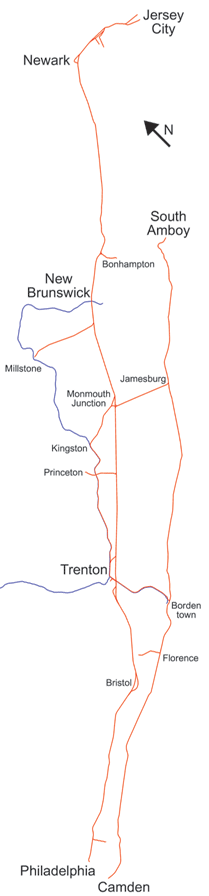
A map of the P&T and related railroads.

The P&T was chartered on February 23, 1832, by the Pennsylvania General Assembly and organized on June 9, 1832. It opened in 1834 from Philadelphia to Trenton. The Camden and Amboy Railroad obtained a controlling stock interest and took over operations in 1836.

The original terminus was at Kensington station in Philadelphia. The PRR, which controlled the Philadelphia & Trenton, had originally intended to directly connect the two lines through the heart of Philadelphia. However, attempts to buy out and demolish buildings in the right-of-way led to riots, and the P&T was forced to end at Kensington.

On March 23, 1839, the railroad was authorized to build a southern extension along Frankford Avenue, Laurel Street and Front Street, and then run west along the Northern Liberties and Penn Township Railroad on Willow Street to its station at the Third Street Hall, at the northwest corner of Third and Willow Streets. This was never built. The part of the planned extension on Front Street would later be used by the North Pennsylvania Railroad.

The several-mile distance between Kensington and downtown Philadelphia led many southbound passengers to Philadelphia to use the Camden and Amboy Railroad, which terminated at Camden and required a ferry ride across the Delaware River.

To resolve the problem, the Connecting Railway Company was incorporated May 15, 1863. Between 1864 and June 1867, constructed a 6.75-mile (10.86 km) connecting line between Frankford Junction on the P&T and Mantua Junction (now Zoo Junction) on the PRR main line, passing through what is now North Philadelphia. The P&T leased the line, allowing its trains to reach 30th Street Station in West Philadelphia.

The Pennsylvania Railroad leased the P&T on June 30, 1871, and began operating it on December 1, 1871. A branch in Philadelphia, known as the Tioga Street Branch, was built in 1878, and later sold to the Kensington and Tacony Railroad (which was consolidated into the Connecting Railway in 1902).

== Realignments ==
Several realignments have been made. In Bristol, the original alignment lies southeast of the current alignment of the Northeast Corridor. Over the Delaware River, the current alignment is southeast of the original one, which used the Trenton Free Bridge.

Finally, the last bit in Trenton originally ran along West Canal Street, Merchant Street, Stockton Street and Hanover Street, ending at the original station at Broad Street and Hanover Street. It was joined to the Camden and Amboy Railroad's Trenton Branch by a bridge across the Delaware and Raritan Canal by 1836; it then used the station on the east side of the canal, just south of State Street, until the C&A Trenton Branch was realigned around 1865 and the current station was built.

== The line today ==
North of Frankford Junction in Philadelphia, where the Connecting Railway joined, the line is part of Amtrak's Northeast Corridor. The northernmost part south of Frankford Junction is still in place for freight, but the rest has been removed.
