= Burlington and Mount Holly Railroad and Transportation Company =

Former railroad and transportation company in New Jersey

- Burlington County Railroad

Overview
- Dates of operation: 1848–1866
- Successor: Camden and Burlington County Railroad

Technical
- Track gauge: 1,435 mm (4 ft 8 1/2 in)
- Length: 13.65 miles (21.97 km)

The Burlington and Mount Holly Railroad and Transportation Company was a railway company in the United States. It was incorporated in 1848 and opened its first line in 1849. It was consolidated with the Camden, Moorestown, Hainesport and Mount Holly Horse Car Railroad in 1866 to form the Camden and Burlington County Railroad. Its lines eventually became part of the Pennsylvania Railroad system and are mostly abandoned.

== History ==
The Burlington and Mount Holly Railroad and Transportation Company was incorporated on February 11, 1848. The company initially planned to build south from a connection with the Camden and Amboy Railroad's main line at Burlington, New Jersey along High Street, but this was opposed by residents, who were already inconvenienced by the Camden and Amboy's street running on Broad Street. Instead, the company settled on a terminal on the mouth of the Assiscunk Creek in East Burlington, crossing and connecting with the Camden and Amboy a short distance to the south. Construction began in December, and the company's initial line extended 7.15 miles (11.51 km) south from East Burlington to Mount Holly, New Jersey. It terminated in the vicinity of Grant Street, to the north of the North Branch Rancocas Creek. Completion was celebrated with special trains on June 16, 1849, and the line was formally opened on June 18, 1849. Four trains operated daily in each direction, except Sundays, when the frequency was reduced to two trains each way. Connections were made at Burlington with Camden and Amboy trains and steamboats on the Delaware River. The railroad initially experimented with an omnibus service to pick up passengers in Mount Holly, but this was discontinued after the first year.

On March 20, 1857, the railroad obtained a supplement to its charter, allowing it to extend from Mount Holly to Pemberton and New Egypt, and change its name to the Burlington County Railroad. The extension was promoted by Samuel R. Gaskill, who owned large marl pits in the vicinity of Pemberton. This material was then in great demand as a fertilizer. Work commenced in late 1860. Building south from Grant Street, the extension crossed the looping North Branch Rancocas Creek three times before turning east, paralleling the creek to the south before crossing it once more east of Birmingham and terminating at a station on the north side of Pemberton. The extension was completed and opened on January 1, 1863 and the company duly changed its name on July 4. It did not make use of its rights to extend beyond Pemberton to New Egypt. Gaskill's marl company made good use of the extension, shipping 12,000 short tons (11,000,000 kg) of marl over the railroad in the first year of its operation.

The company was consolidated with the Camden, Moorestown, Hainesport and Mount Holly Horse Car Railroad on May 2, 1866, to form the Camden and Burlington County Railroad.

The company's line between Burlington and Mount Holly became known as the Burlington Branch, and was the subject of an experimental railway electrification installation between 1895–1901. The Pennsylvania Railroad abandoned the branch in 1925. Track in East Burlington and from Grant Street to the junction at Mount Holly was retained for some time to serve local industries.

The line between Mount Holly and Pemberton was extended west to Pavonia (Camden, New Jersey) by the Camden and Burlington County Railroad and became the Pennsylvania Railroad's Pemberton Branch.
