= Amboy Branch =

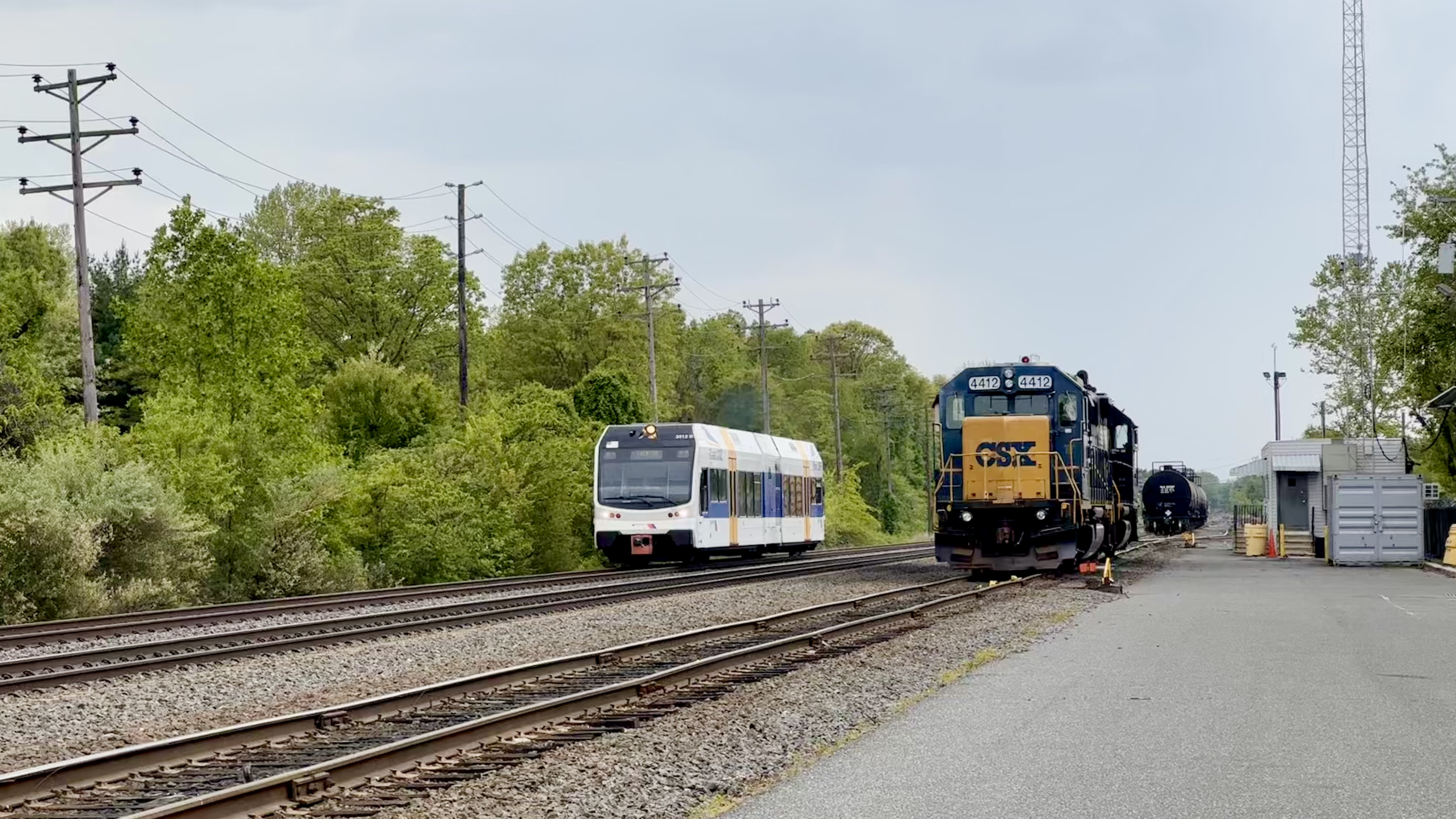
- River Line train and freight train in Burlington

Overview
- Owner: Conrail Shared Assets Operations; NJ Transit

Service
- Services: River Line

History
- Opened: October 1832

Technical
- Line length: 61 mi (98 km)
- Track gauge: 1,435 mm (4 ft 8 1/2 in) standard gauge

The Amboy Branch is a railway line in the U.S. state of New Jersey. It was the original main line of the Camden and Amboy Railroad, and at its fullest extent ran 61 miles (98 km) from South Amboy, New Jersey, to Camden, New Jersey. The line was built between 1830 and 1834 by the Camden and Amboy, and eventually became part of the Pennsylvania Railroad's network. Ownership of the line today is split between Conrail Shared Assets Operations and NJ Transit, whose River Line uses the branch between Camden and Bordentown, New Jersey.

== History ==
The Camden and Amboy Railroad was incorporated on February 4, 1830. Its main line was completed between Bordentown, New Jersey, and Hightstown, New Jersey, in October 1832. It was extended north from Bordentown to South Amboy, New Jersey, on Raritan Bay, that December. The southern extension from Bordentown to Camden, New Jersey, opened in September 1834. Passengers embarked on ships at Bordentown or Camden to reach Philadelphia. The Bordentown Branch opened in January 1838, creating a connection with the Philadelphia and Trenton Railroad at Trenton, New Jersey.

The Camden and Amboy was consolidated with the New Jersey Rail Road and Transportation Company and Delaware and Raritan Canal Company in 1872 to form the United New Jersey Railroad and Canal Company. The Pennsylvania Railroad leased this new company from the outset. Although the Camden and Amboy lines became part of the Pennsylvania system, formal ownership remained with the United New Jersey Railroad and Canal Company through the Penn Central merger and bankruptcy.

The importance of the Amboy Branch as a through route for passengers lessened after the parallel line between Trenton and Newark, New Jersey (now Amtrak's Northeast Corridor) was electrified. The Pennsylvania Railroad discontinued service between Bordentown and Jamesburg, New Jersey, in October 1938. Service north of Jamesburg ended on October 23, 1959. Finally, trains between Camden and Trenton via the Bordentown Branch ended on June 28, 1963.

=== Camden ===
For over a century the line's southern terminus in Camden fronted on the Delaware River, with ferry service to Philadelphia. The completion of the Benjamin Franklin Bridge in 1928 began the decline of ferry service on the river, and the Pennsylvania Railroad ceased that service on March 31, 1952. Broadway station, approximately 0.5 miles (0.80 km) to the east, served as the terminus for Pennsylvania and Pennsylvania-Reading Seashore Lines services until 1966. Broadway was also the eastern terminus of the rapid transit Bridge Line, forerunner of the modern PATCO Speedline. Broadway closed in October 1966 as part of an urban redevelopment plan in Camden that included the demolition of the Pennsylvania's elevated route through the city. The Pennsylvania's remaining local services in Camden moved to a new station at 12th Street. The station closed on February 5, 1971, with the discontinuation of the Pennsylvania-Reading Seashore Lines trains to Millville, New Jersey.

=== Conrail ===
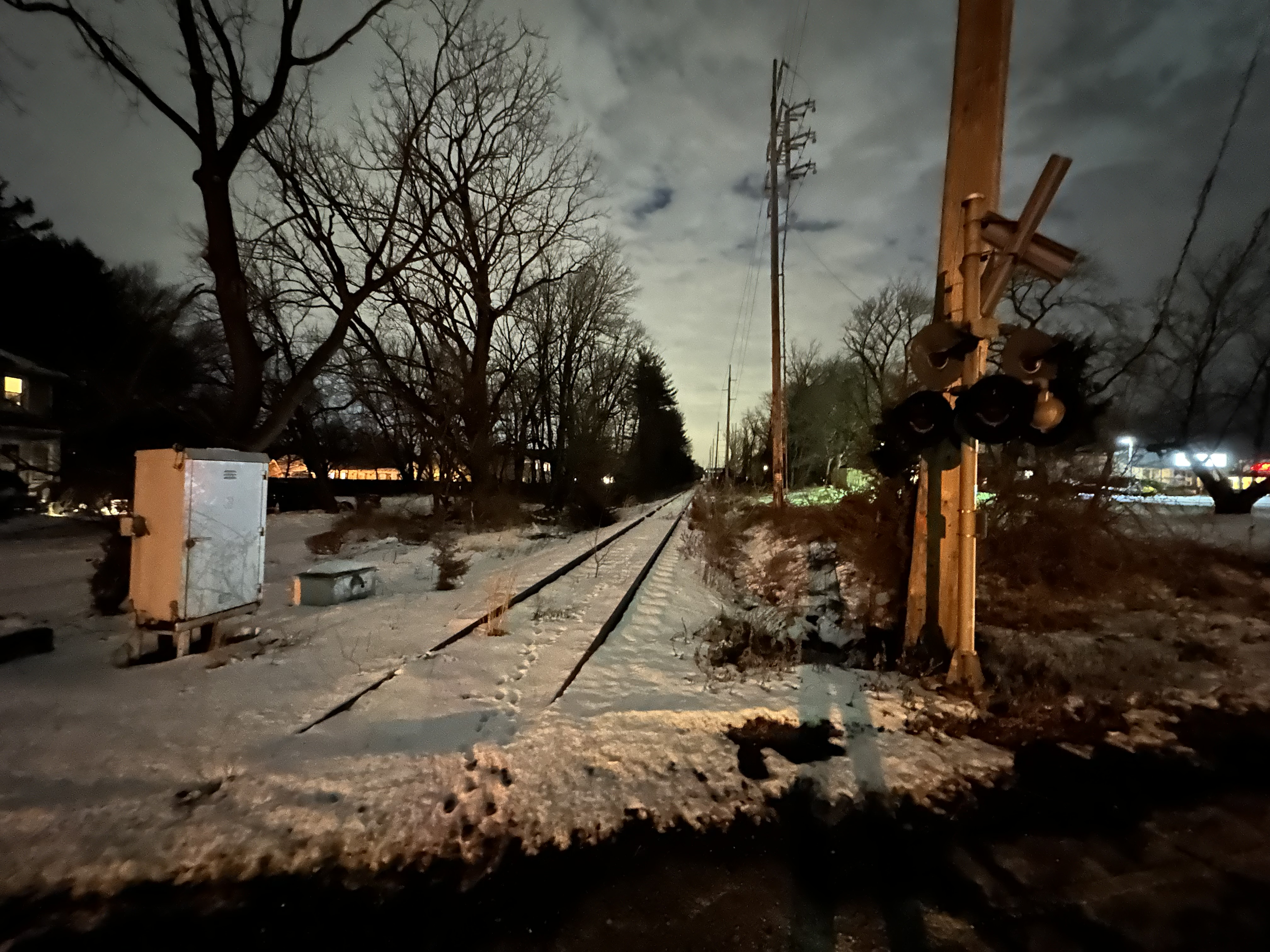
A level crossing of the Hightstown Industrial Track in Monroe Township

Prior to the Penn Central's bankruptcy and the creation of Conrail, the Pennsylvania Railroad abandoned the line between Hightstown and Windsor, New Jersey, splitting the branch. In the latter days of the Penn Central the former Amboy branch was known by several names: Bordentown Branch (Camden–Delair and Trenton–Bordentown), Bordentown Secondary (Delair–Bordentown), Robbinsville Secondary (Bordentown–Windsor), Amboy Secondary (South Amboy–Jamesburg), and Hightstown Secondary (Jamesburg–Hightstown). The entirety was conveyed to Conrail in 1976.

Under Conrail, the line between Bordentown and Camden was combined with the Bordentown Branch to form the Bordentown Secondary. Conrail sold the entirety of the Bordentown Secondary to NJ Transit in 1999 for $67.5 million for a planned conversion to light rail operation. Conrail retained trackage rights over the line. The River Line began operation on March 14, 2004, almost 41 years after the end of Pennsylvania Railroad service.

The section between South Amboy and Jamesburg forms part of the Amboy Secondary, which also includes part of the Jamesburg Branch.

Conrail continues to own the line between Bordentown and Windsor, which it calls the Robbinsville Industrial Track. The line is 5.7 miles (9.2 km) in length and portions run parallel to U.S. Route 130. According to some reports, the line stopped being in active use around the 1990s, while according to other reports, trains were still running on it into the 2000s. In 2006, Conrail filed a petition for abandonment of the stretch. Considering the historic value of a rail line originally completed in 1832, the application for abandonment underwent review by the New Jersey Historic Preservation Office. By 2009, legal abandonment had not happened, but portions of the track had become overgrown or had been pulled up at crossings. At the beginning of 2010, Conrail was made eligible for $2 million in funds from the New Jersey Department of Transportation for a proposed project to make upgrades to the Robbinsville Industrial Track.

The section between Jamesburg and Hightstown is called the Hightstown Industrial Track. When Conrail began operations it considered abandoning this line, but in 1977 announced that it would keep it going. However, while the original Highstown Secondary ran for 8.3 miles (13.4 km) , by the late 1980s, Conrail had terminated the line at Cranbury, short of Hightstown, making it 5.2 miles (8.4 km) in length. Conrail did do $500,000 worth of upgrades to the line during 1988. The New Jersey Department of Transportation undertook work to improve the at-grade crossings for the line in Monroe Township in 2006, and again in 2010.
