= Camden and Amboy Railroad and Transportation Company =

Railway company in New Jersey, US

Overview
- Headquarters: New York City, U.S.
- Locale: New Jersey
- Dates of operation: 1830–1872
- Founder: Robert L. Stevens
- Successor: United New Jersey Railroad and Canal Company

Technical
- Track gauge: 4 ft 10 in (1,473 mm)
- Track length: 99.71 miles (160.47 km)

The Camden and Amboy Railroad and Transportation Company, usually shortened to the Camden and Amboy Railroad (C&A), was a railway company in New Jersey. It was incorporated in 1830 and opened its first line in 1832, making it one of the oldest railroads in North America.

It was consolidated with two other railroads in 1872 to form the United New Jersey Railroad and Canal Company (a forerunner of the Pennsylvania Railroad). Part of the company's original main line between Camden, New Jersey, and Bordentown, is used by the River Line.

At its fullest extent the main line ran 61 miles (98 km) from South Amboy, New Jersey, to Camden, New Jersey.

== History ==
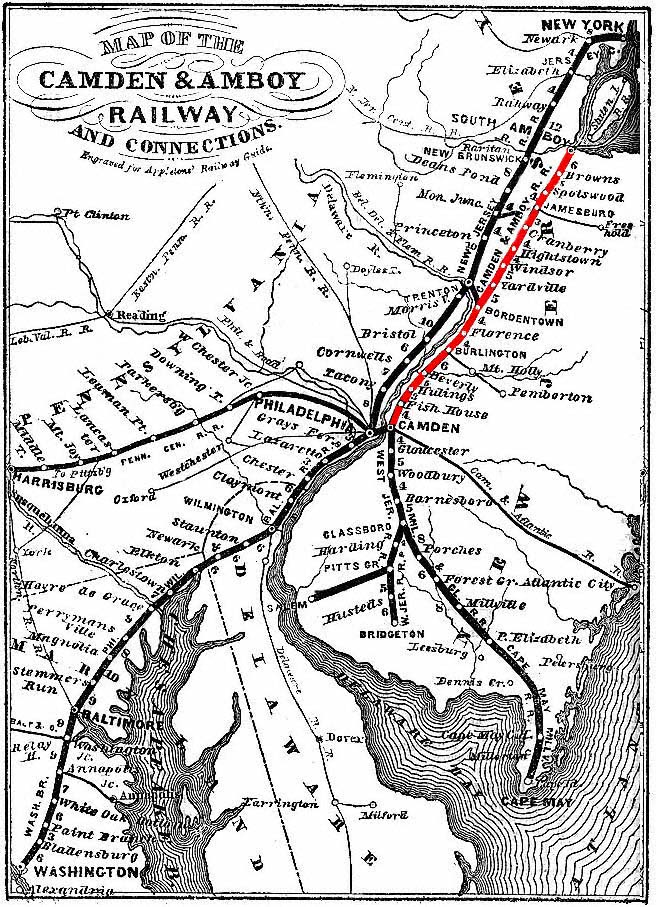
A map of the Camden and Amboy in 1869

The state of New Jersey chartered both the Camden and Amboy and the Delaware and Raritan Canal Company on February 4, 1830, to develop connections between New York City and Philadelphia. The two companies, though remaining independent, agreed to cooperate and became known as the "Joint Companies." The Camden and Amboy's charter gave it a monopoly for rail transportation across the entire state, which one historian called "a very foolish action" by the legislature.

The line was built with a gauge of four feet ten inches between the rails. (Eventually, standard gauge would be set at four feet eight and one-half inches.) The C&A was the first railroad to use wooden railroad ties and T-section rails. The road's first president, Robert L. Stevens, is credited as being the first to develop the use of T-rails in the United States, but such rails were already in use in Great Britain at the time. In fact, T-rails used by the C&A were imported from Britain.

C&A service between Trenton and New Brunswick began in 1832, and the company completed a line between Bordentown, on the Delaware River, and South Amboy, in December of that year.

In 1833, a train traveling from South Amboy broke an axle in Hightstown and derailed. Irish actor Tyrone Power was the only one of the 24 passengers not seriously hurt, suffering only minor injuries; he helped a surgeon treat the injured passengers. He said of the accident that it was "the most dreadful catastrophe that ever my eyes beheld". The injured passengers included former president and current congressman John Quincy Adams and entrepreneur Cornelius Vanderbilt, who broke a leg. Vanderbilt swore he would never ride on a train again, an oath he was unable to keep after he began buying up railroads some decades later.

The C&A purchased the British-built steam locomotive later called John Bull from Robert Stephenson and Company, named it Stevens, after the line's president and gave it the number 1. The line used the engine heavily from 1833 until 1866, when it was removed from active service and placed in storage, later to be refurbished and used for ceremonial purposes by the Pennsylvania Railroad when that line took over the Camden & Amboy's assets.

When the engine arrived, it was in parts, and was assembled by Isaac Dripps, a twenty-nine year old who had never seen a locomotive before and had no drawings to go by – nevertheless he managed to put it together in a matter of a few weeks. This feat earned him a job as the railroad's Chief Engineer, a position he retained for 22 years. Since the engine had no tender, Dripps improvised one by building a small flatcar for the wood with a whiskey cask for the water. Dripps went on to tinker with the Stevens to improve its operation, and then built a new series of engines, the first time a series of new locomotives had been built in the United States. One of Dripps' new engines was a forty-ton machine appropriately named Monster, which had driving wheels with a four-foot diameter.

Dripps also came up with the idea of putting a "cowcatcher" on the front of an engine to prevent stray cows and other animals from being run into and potentially derailing the engine; to keep down construction costs, early American railroads were generally not protected by fences, as those in Britain were. He first tried a low truck with pointed wrought iron bars, but this simple impaled the animal, which at least once had to be removed using a block-and-tackle. He then devised the cowcatcher as it has come to be known, a low frontal appendage that looked something like a snowplow, designed to push the animal to one side of the track or the other.

In September 1834, the C&A was extended south from Bordentown to Camden, across the Delaware from Philadelphia, In the absence of a bridge over the Delaware, passengers bound for Philadelphia transferred to boats at Bordentown or Camden.

The line began carrying mail in 1834, one of the earliest railroads in the US to do so, years before Congress designated all railroads as being "post roads" qualified to carry mail (1838).

The Protection Act, passed in 1832, "prohibit[ed] any other railroad from building within three miles of the Camden & Amboy's termini." This did not preclude the New Jersey Rail Road and Transportation Company from building a line between Jersey City, New Jersey, and New Brunswick, New Jersey. The line was fully opened in 1837. Meanwhile, the Philadelphia and Trenton Railroad, a Pennsylvania company, was building a line between its two namesake cities.

In 1836, the Philadelphia and Trenton agreed to cooperate with the Joint Companies. The Camden and Amboy linked these projects together by building from Bordentown to Trenton (1838), and then Trenton to New Brunswick (1839).

The New Brunswick Division, as originally constructed, closely paralleled the Delaware and Raritan Canal between Kingston and Trenton. In 1864, a new alignment was opened that bypassed this winding route, extending from the Belvidere Delaware's line at Trenton. To maintain access to Princeton, the Princeton Branch, serving Princeton, New Jersey, opened the year after. Upon the old line's closing, the Kingston Branch, serving Kingston, New Jersey, began service on the old line in 1866. A branch to Florence, New Jersey was opened in 1872.

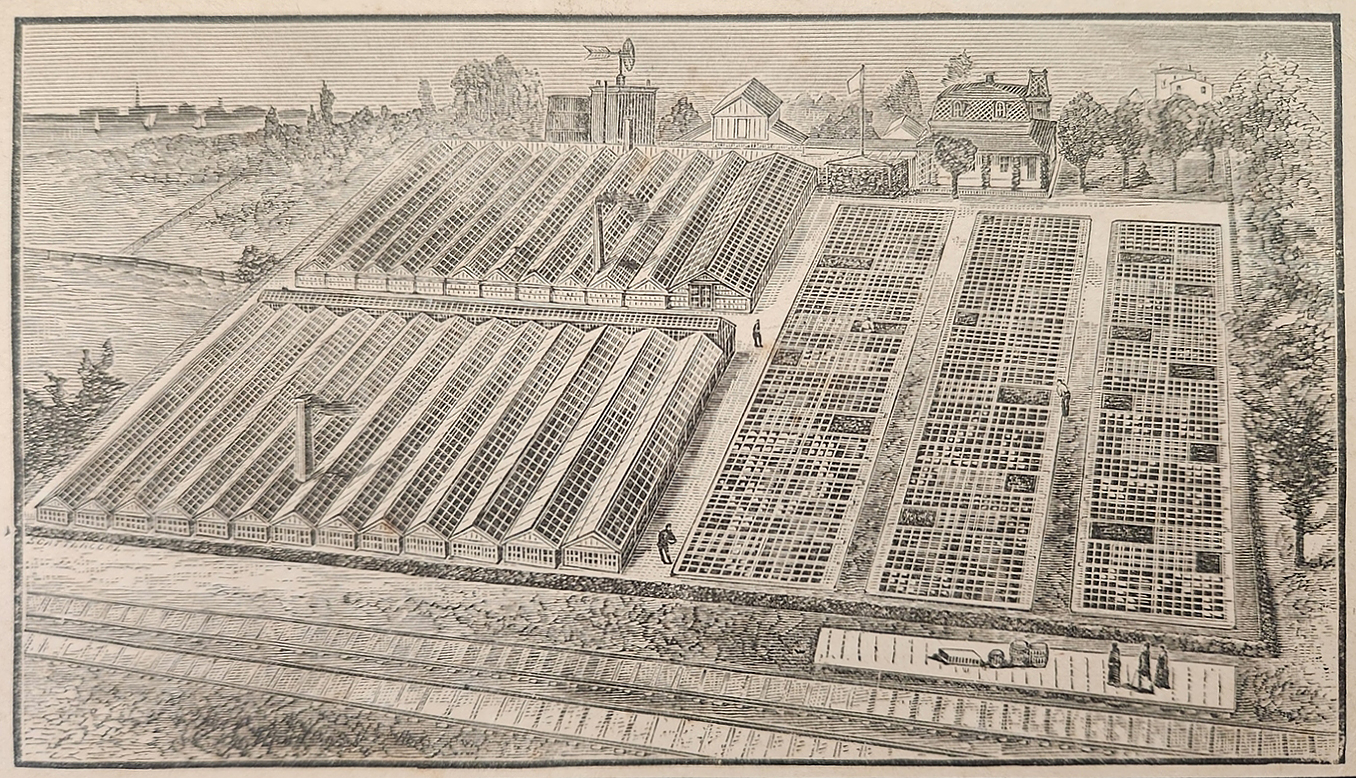
Reverse of an 1876 advertising card for "Mabbett & Wiles, General brokers and commission merchants, No. 1 Dock Street Market, Philadelphia". It is described on the obverse as "Bird's eve view, Green houses and truck farm of Mabbett & Wiles. Located at Beideman Station, three miles from Market St. Ferry, Phila, On P.R.R. C.&A. Division". The line and station are depicted, bottom-right.

The New Jersey Rail Road, Camden and Amboy Railroad, and Delaware and Raritan Canal Company moved to a closer association in 1867 when they created a joint board of directors. This was known as the "United Companies", although all three companies continued to be technically independent. A formal consolidation into the United New Jersey Railroad and Canal Company followed in 1872; the Pennsylvania Railroad leased the new company from the outset. The Camden and Amboy's main line became known as the Amboy Branch, the ownership of which is split between Conrail Shared Assets Operations and NJ Transit, whose River Line uses the branch line between Camden and Bordentown, New Jersey.

== See also ==
- Amboy Branch
- John Bull (locomotive)
