= Clara Barton School =

Clara Barton School may refer to:

- Clara Barton School (Cabin John, Maryland), also known as Clara Barton Community Center, a Maryland Historical Trust-inventoried historic place
- Clara Barton High School, Brooklyn, New York
- Clara Barton School (Philadelphia), listed on the U.S. National Register of Historic Places
- Clara Barton Schoolhouse, Bordentown, New Jersey

== See also ==
- Schools named for Clara Barton
