= Mailliard =

Mailliard may refer to:

- Charlotte Mailliard Shultz (born 1933), American heiress and socialite
- Joseph Mailliard (1873–1945), American ornithologist
- William S. Mailliard (1917–1992), member of the U.S. House of Representatives from California
