= Callier =

Callier is a surname. Notable people with the surname include:

- Alex Callier (born 1972), Belgian musician
- Debbie Gary Callier (born 1948), American air show pilot
- Frances Callier (born 1969), American actress, producer, writer, and comedian
- Terry Callier (1945–2012), American guitarist and singer-songwriter
