= Saint Mary School, Bordentown =

Defunct Catholic school in New Jersey, USA

Coordinates: 40.147389°N 74.709048°W

Saint Mary School was a private coeducational Roman Catholic day school in Bordentown, New Jersey, that served students in kindergarten through eighth grade as part of Saint Mary's parish in the Roman Catholic Diocese of Trenton.

The school closed in June 2013 with a final graduating class of 11 students. The Diocese of Trenton cited the school's financial challenges in the face of enrollment that was half of the 220 students needed to remain financially viable.

== History ==
Saint Mary's was founded by the Sisters of Mercy, a sisterhood based in Ireland. In 1843 the organization came to Pittsburgh before moving their Motherhouse to Bordentown in 1873. They had a church and school built in Hilltop, New Jersey, but the space there was inadequate and they moved back to Bordentown, where they built a new church and school. These two stayed in use, and have been used ever since. This year, 2013, they will be celebrating 125 years of Faith, Service, and Academics.
