= Debbie Gary Callier =

American air show pilot and author

Debbie Gary Callier (born February 24, 1948) is an American air show pilot. She began flying at age nineteen, and was the first woman to fly in a formation aerobatic team. She also wrote the Bellanca Pilot Proficiency Training Manual.

== Biography ==
Callier graduated in 1965 from William McFarland High School in Bordentown Township, New Jersey and attended George Washington University before moving with her father to Saint Thomas.

Gary first took flying lessons in 1966 in New Jersey. Her first solo flight took place in the Virgin Islands, where she had moved with her family. Starting in 1968, she began working as a glider instructor and in 1969, met Jim Holland when she flew a glider at the St. Croix airshow. She learned aerobatics from Holland and joined his airshow. She performed for some time for Holland, then worked for a Canadian aerobatic team. She competed against 40 men for her spot on the aerobatics team. After, she joined the Bede Jet Team. She became the first woman to fly full-time in an aerial formation team. The Star Tribune called Gary "the world's leading woman show pilot" in 1978. She also appeared in episode 12 of the first season of the TV series The Blue Marble in 1974. She has flown a Bede BD-5J and a Pitts S-1A open cockpit biplane doing her stunts.

After 1972, she started working as an instructor at the Flabob Airport. When she was not doing airshows, she worked as an instructor. Later, she worked in Alexandria, Minnesota.

In 1978, Gary married Jim Callier, who was the president of the Bellanca Aircraft Corp. In 1994, Gary earned a journalism degree from the University of Houston. She did an internship at the Houston Post, and wrote for Air & Space, a magazine published by the Smithsonian Institution. She also took time off from air shows to raise her children.

Gary started flying airshows again around 1998. She encourages young people, especially girls, to think about going into aviation as a career.

In 1979, the Supersisters trading card set was produced and distributed; one of the cards featured Gary's name and picture. A photo-lithograph of the card is owned by the Metropolitan Museum of Art.
