= Crosswicks Creek Site III =

- U.S. National Register of Historic Places
- New Jersey Register of Historic Places
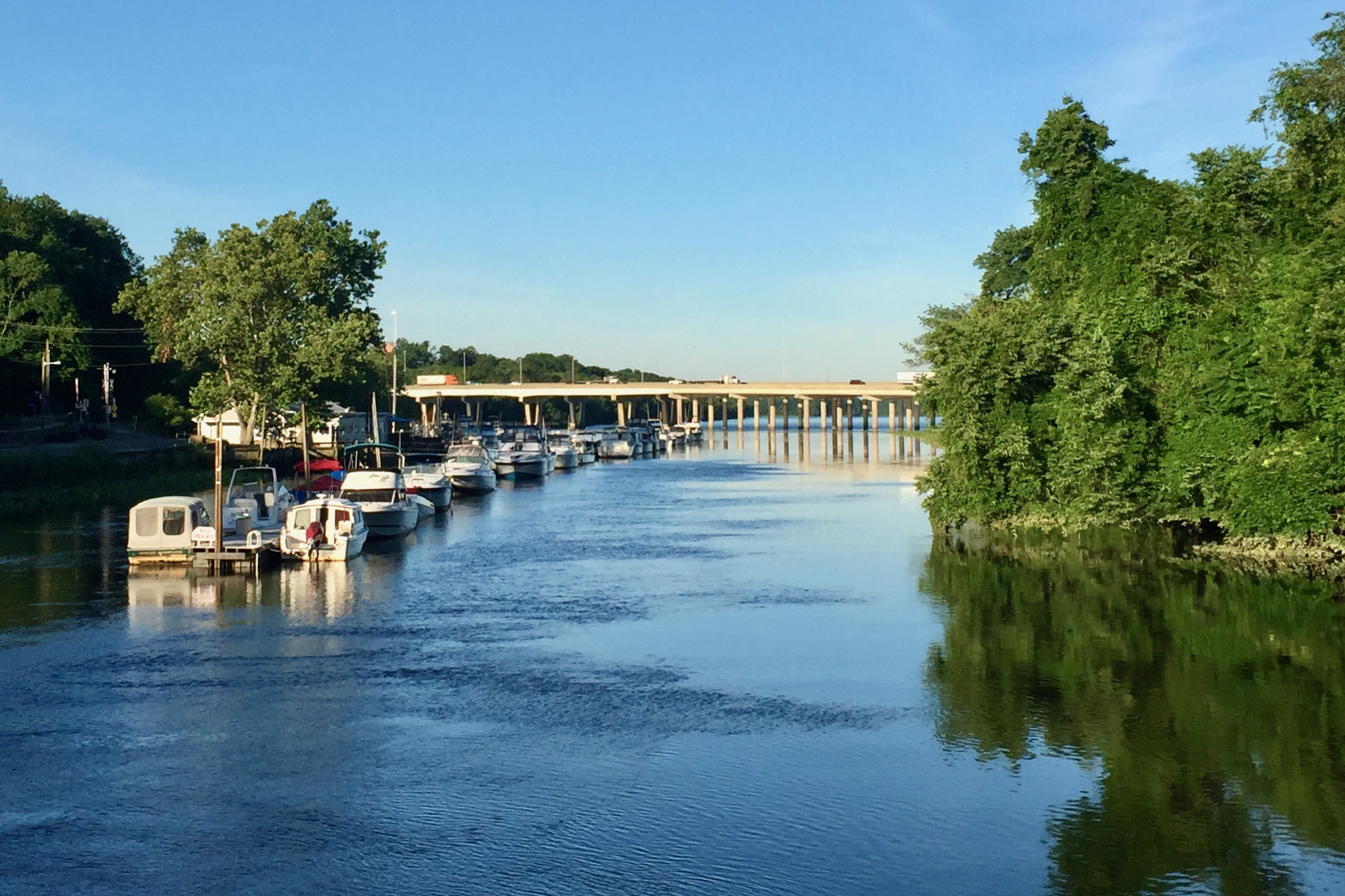
- General area of the site in 2015
- Location: Crosswicks Creek, Bordentown and Hamilton Township
- Area: 3 acres (1.2 ha)
- Built: 1778
- Architectural style: 18th century vessel
- NRHP reference No.: 87001795
- NJRHP No.: 753

Significant dates
- Added to NRHP: November 26, 1990
- Designated NJRHP: August 31, 1987

The Crosswicks Creek Site III is a historical archaeological site in the vicinity of Bordentown in Burlington County and Hamilton Township in Mercer County, New Jersey. It encompasses the remains of Revolutionary War-era ships that were sunk in Crosswicks Creek in 1778. The site was listed on the National Register of Historic Places on November 26, 1990, for its significance in military and maritime history.

== History ==
Many Continental ships were trapped in the Delaware River watershed above Philadelphia following the capture of that city by the British Army in 1777. Prior to departing the city in 1778, the British staged a raid to destroy ships that Continental and state forces had secreted in various waterways on May 8. A significant number of these were located in and around Bordentown, with two known to have been scuttled in Crosswicks Creek. These two wrecks were discovered by an historical archaeological survey in 1984.

== See also ==
- Abbott Farm Historic District – also an archaeological site
