= Susan Waters =

American painter (1823–1900)

- Born: Susan Catherine Moore; May 18, 1823; Binghamton, New York, US
- Died: July 7, 1900 (aged 77); Trenton, New Jersey, US
- Style: Painting
- Movement: Folk art, naïve art

Susan Catherine Moore Waters (May 18, 1823 – July 7, 1900) was an American painter. Her early career in New York and Pennsylvania focused on portraits. After moving to Bordentown, New Jersey, she specialized in paintings of animals as well as the occasional still life and other subjects. She was notable as a self-taught 19th-century woman artist who supported herself and her husband through her art.

== Early years ==
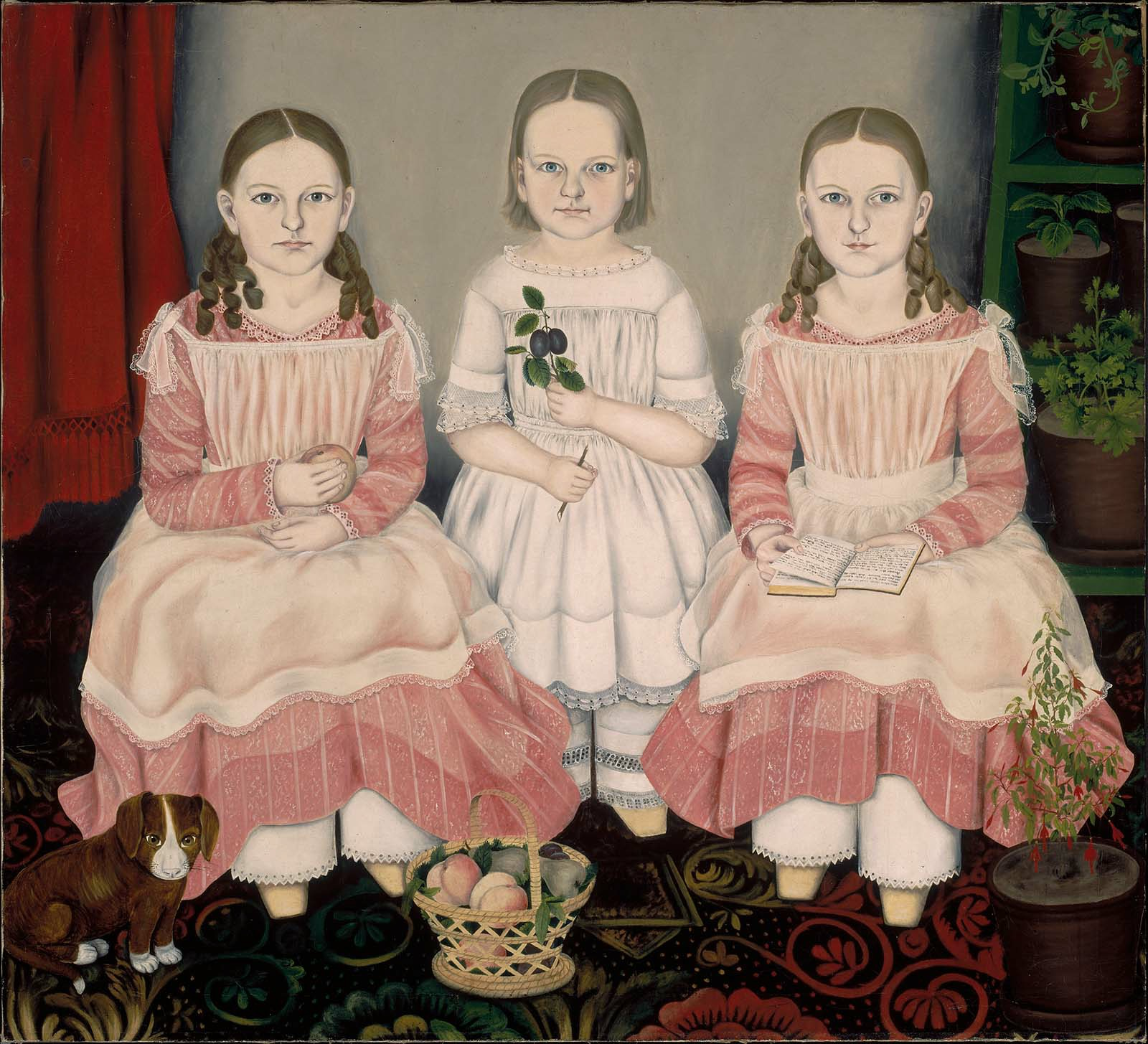
The Lincoln Children, 1845.

Waters was born in Binghamton, New York, to Lark Moore (a cooper) and his wife, Sally. A self-taught artist with little formal training, she attended Friendsville Boarding School, a Quaker school in Friendsville, Pennsylvania, where she helped pay tuition for her sister and herself by "painting copies for the course in Natural History." On June 27, 1841, at age 17, she married William Church Waters, whose poor health left her in the role of breadwinner.

== Artistic career ==
Waters' career as a traveling artist began with commissioned portraits and lessons in New York and Pennsylvania, with her first known painting dated 1843. In addition to canvas, Waters used materials readily available to her, including mattress ticking, cotton, and linen.

Waters’ early paintings, along with her teaching of painting and drawing, were sufficient to ensure herself and her husband some financial security, but she wished to expand her range of subject matter, as she indicated in an 1851 letter. She and her husband switched to photography, taking daguerreotypes and ambrotypes. She also was active in movements for the humane treatment of animals and for women's suffrage, serving as recording secretary of the New Jersey Woman Suffrage Association in 1871.

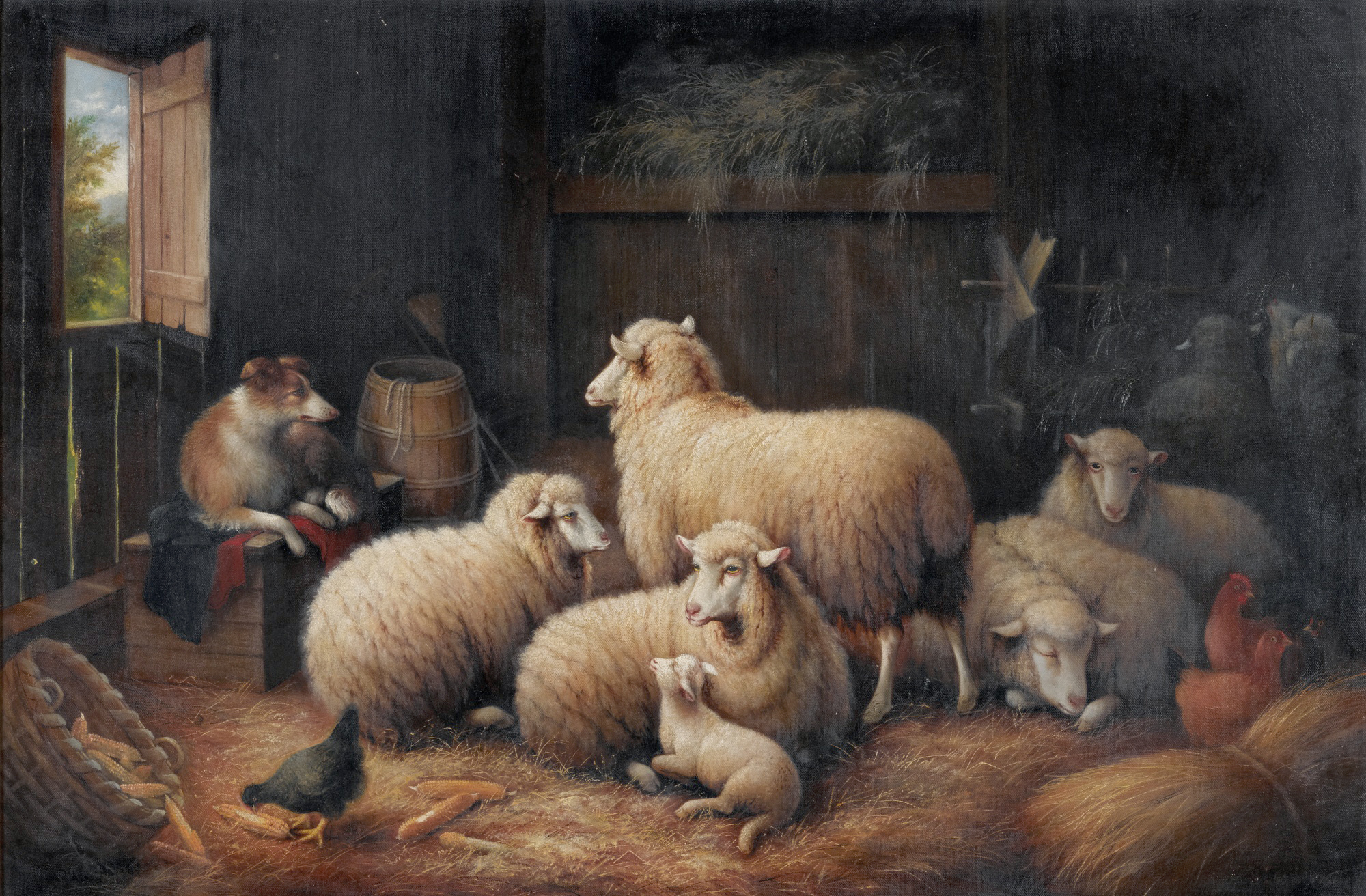
Sheep and Dog in a Barn (1890) by Susan Catherine Waters

By May 1852, the Waters had moved to Bordentown, New Jersey. In 1855, they moved to Mount Pleasant, Iowa, returning to Friendsville four years later. In 1866, the Waters returned to Bordentown, where they spent the rest of their lives. Starting in 1870, Susan Waters began to paint with much greater naturalism and sophistication of style than her 1840s portraits evinced. She produced at least fifty oil paintings during this period, including landscapes, still lifes, and many paintings of sheep, dogs, squirrels, and other animals in pastoral settings.

In 1876, Waters was invited to exhibit two of her animal paintings at the Centennial Exposition in Philadelphia, receiving critical praise along with a glut of commissions. She achieved financial security and continued to paint until two months before her death.

== Later life and death ==
After her husband died in 1899, Waters left Bordentown to live in a Quaker nursing home in Trenton, New Jersey, where she died on July 7, 1900, at the age of 77. She was interred in the Bordentown Cemetery alongside her husband. They had no children.

== Collections ==
Waters' art is held in collections at numerous institutions, including the following:

- Addison Gallery of American Art, MA
- Arnot Art Museum, NY
- Bordentown Historical Society
- Burlington County Historical Society, NJ
- Crystal Bridges Museum of American Art, AR
- Fenimore Art Museum, NY
- Maier Museum of Art, VA
- Metropolitan Museum of Art, NY
- Museum of Fine Arts, Boston, MA
- National Gallery of Art, Washington, D.C.
- New Jersey State Museum, NJ
- The Newark Museum of Art, NJ
- Roberson Museum, NY

== Exhibitions ==
Waters' art was featured in the following exhibitions:

- 1876 Centennial Exhibition, PA
- 1979 Bedford Gallery, Longwood University, VA
- 1980 Arnot Art Museum, NY

== Sources ==
- Bice, Arlene S. Bordentown. Portsmouth, NH: Arcadia Publishing, 2002. p. 61.
- Heslip, Colleen C. “Susan C. Waters.” The Magazine Antiques. vol. 115 (1979): 769–777.
- Gerdts, William H. Painting and Sculpture in New Jersey. Princeton, NJ: 1964. pp. 109–112.
- Strass, Stephanie. “Susan Waters.” American Women Artists, 1819–1947. The Neville Strass Collection, 2003.
- Waters, Susan C. and Paul D. Schweizer. “A Letter by Susan Waters Provides New Information on Her Career.” American Art Journal. Vol. 19, No. 1 (1987): 76–77.
