= Bordentown Regional High School =

High school in Burlington County, New Jersey, US

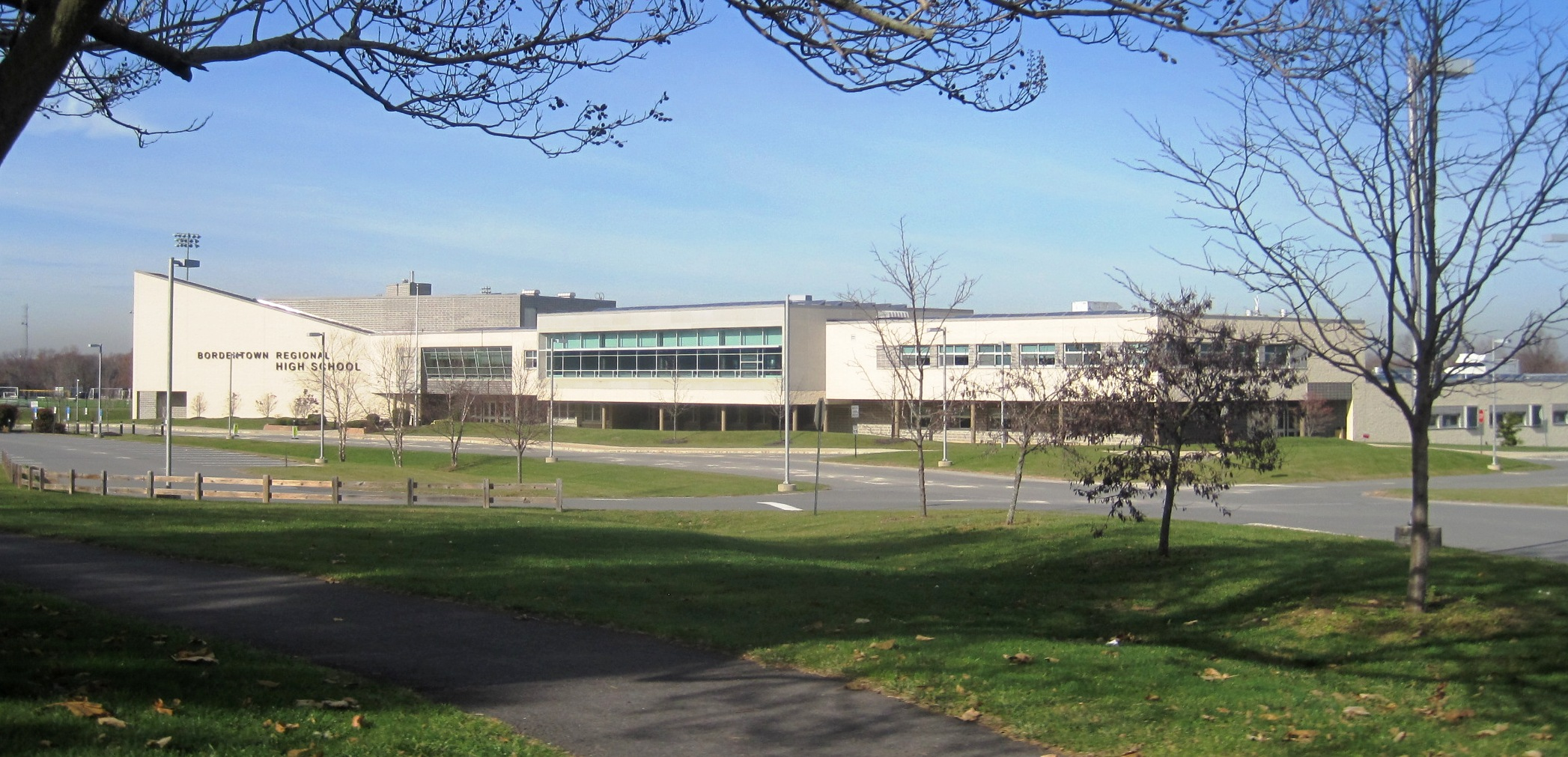

Location
- 318 Ward Avenue; Bordentown, Burlington County, New Jersey 08505; United States
- 40.154203°N 74.684434°W

Information
- Type: Public high school
- Established: 1965
- School district: Bordentown Regional School District
- NCES School ID: 340203000960
- Principal: Michelle Spaventa
- Faculty: 55.0 FTEs
- Grades: 9-12
- Enrollment: 728 (as of 2024–25)
- Student to teacher ratio: 13.2:1
- Colors: Yellow; White
- Athletics conference: Burlington County Scholastic League
- Team name: Scotties
- Rivals: Florence Memorial HS, Burlington Twp. HS, Northern Burlington HS, Burlington City HS, New Egypt HS, Delran HS, Cinnaminson HS
- Yearbook: The Fabella
- Website: brhs.bordentown.k12.nj.us

Bordentown Regional High School is a comprehensive public high school that serves students in ninth through twelfth grades from five communities in northern Burlington County, in the U.S. state of New Jersey, operating as the lone secondary school of the Bordentown Regional School District. The high school serves Bordentown City, Bordentown Township (where the school is located) and Fieldsboro Borough. The New Hanover Township School District, consisting of New Hanover Township (non-military portions) and Wrightstown Borough, sends students to the Bordentown district on a tuition basis for grades 9–12 as part of a sending/receiving relationship.

As of the 2024–25 school year, the school had an enrollment of 728 students and 55.0 classroom teachers (on an FTE basis), for a student–teacher ratio of 13.2:1. There were 115 students (15.8% of enrollment) eligible for free lunch and 13 (1.8% of students) eligible for reduced-cost lunch.

== History ==
Bordentown Regional High School opened in 1965, succeeding William McFarland High School. It is the largest school in the Bordentown Regional School District, which was approved by voters in 1982. Original plans to have a new high school building open in September 2005 had to be delayed after construction bids for the project opened in November 2003 came in substantially above the original estimate of $34 million. With the project mostly completed at a cost of $36 million, the high school then relocated to its current building, opening for students on September 11, 2006, with the former high school building becoming Bordentown Regional Middle School. Rowan College at Burlington County offers college-level courses and provides the opportunity to complete associate degree programs at the high school.

== Awards, recognition and rankings ==
The school was the 193rd-ranked public high school in New Jersey out of 339 schools statewide in New Jersey Monthly magazine's September 2014 cover story on the state's "Top Public High Schools", using a new ranking methodology. The school had been ranked 200th in the state of 328 schools in 2012, after being ranked 218th in 2010 out of 322 schools listed. The magazine ranked the school 208th in 2008 out of 316 schools. The school was ranked 172nd in the magazine's September 2006 issue, which surveyed 316 schools across the state.

The school received the Governor's School of Excellence Award in 2003; from 2000 to 2003 the number of violent acts in the school fell by 40% and graduation rates increased.

The school was recognized as the New Jersey High School Mock Trial co-champion with Montclair High School in 2020 after the finals were cancelled due to the COVID-19 pandemic.

== Athletics ==
The Bordentown Regional High School Scotties compete in the Burlington County Scholastic League, which is comprised of public and private high schools covering Burlington, Mercer and Ocean counties in Central Jersey, operating under the supervision of the New Jersey State Interscholastic Athletic Association (NJSIAA). With 542 students in grades 10–12, the school was classified by the NJSIAA for the 2022–24 school years as Group II Central for most athletic competition purposes. The football team competes in the Freedom Division of the 94-team West Jersey Football League superconference and was classified by the NJSIAA as Group II South for football for 2024–2026, which included schools with 514 to 685 students.

The school participates as the host school / lead agency for a joint wrestling team with Florence Township Memorial High School. The co-op program operates under agreements scheduled to expire at the end of the 2023–24 school year.

The baseball team won the Group II South state sectional title in 1960 and the Group I South title in 1961. The 1978 team finished the season with a 16–6 record after winning the Group I state championship, defeating Chatham Borough High School by a score of 6–4 in the playoff finals at Mercer County Park.

The boys soccer team won the Group I state title in 1986, defeating Chatham Township High School by a score of 2–1 in double overtime in the finals of the playoff tournament at Trenton State College.

The boys track team won the spring / outdoor track state championship in Group I in 2001.

The boys' basketball team won the 2006 Central Jersey Group I state sectional title, edging Metuchen High School by a score of 75–73 in the tournament final.

The girls' softball team made it to the 2006 Central Jersey Group I tournament as the number 1 seed, defeating Middlesex High School 2–0 in the first round and Metuchen High School by a score of 10–0 in the second round, before losing to New Egypt High School by a score of 3–2 in the tournament final.

The boys' bowling team in the 2004-05 year were the 2005 Freedom Division champions, 2005 Burlington County Scholastic League champions and took second place in the NJSIAA team tournament, just 29 pins behind state champion Carteret High School, which had a pinfall of 2,988.

The girls' bowling team won the Group I state championship four times in a span of five years, taking the title in 2007, 2008, 2010 and 2011. The program's four state titles are ranked sixth in the state.

The girls' soccer team won the state sectional tournament but lost in the state tournament finals in Group I in 1986, 1987 and 1991 and in Group II in 2012.

== Administration ==
The school's principal is Michelle Spaventa. Her core administration team includes three assistant principals.

== Notable alumni ==
Includes alumni of Bordentown Regional High School and its predecessor William McFarland High School.

- Len Boone, singer, songwriter and multi-instrumentalist
- Debbie Gary Callier (born 1948, class of 1965), air show pilot
- Herb Conaway (born 1963, class of 1981), physician and member of the New Jersey General Assembly
- Eric Hamilton (born 1953, class of 1971), retired American football coach who was head football coach at The College of New Jersey from 1977 through 2012, where he had a record of 212–144–6
- Rob Novak (born 1986), runner who specialized in the 800 meters
- Pete Reed (1989–2023), aid worker known for co-founding the medical humanitarian aid organization Global Response Medicine
- Julia Reichert (1946–2022, class of 1964), Academy Award-winning documentary filmmaker and feminist
- Danny Sammons (born 1984, class of 2002), former professional stock car racing driver who competed in the NASCAR Whelen Modified Tour
- Harry W. Shipps (1926–2016, class of 1942), eighth Bishop of Georgia
- Joshua Zeitz (born 1974, class of 1990), historian
