= Crosswicks Creek =

Tributary of the Delaware River

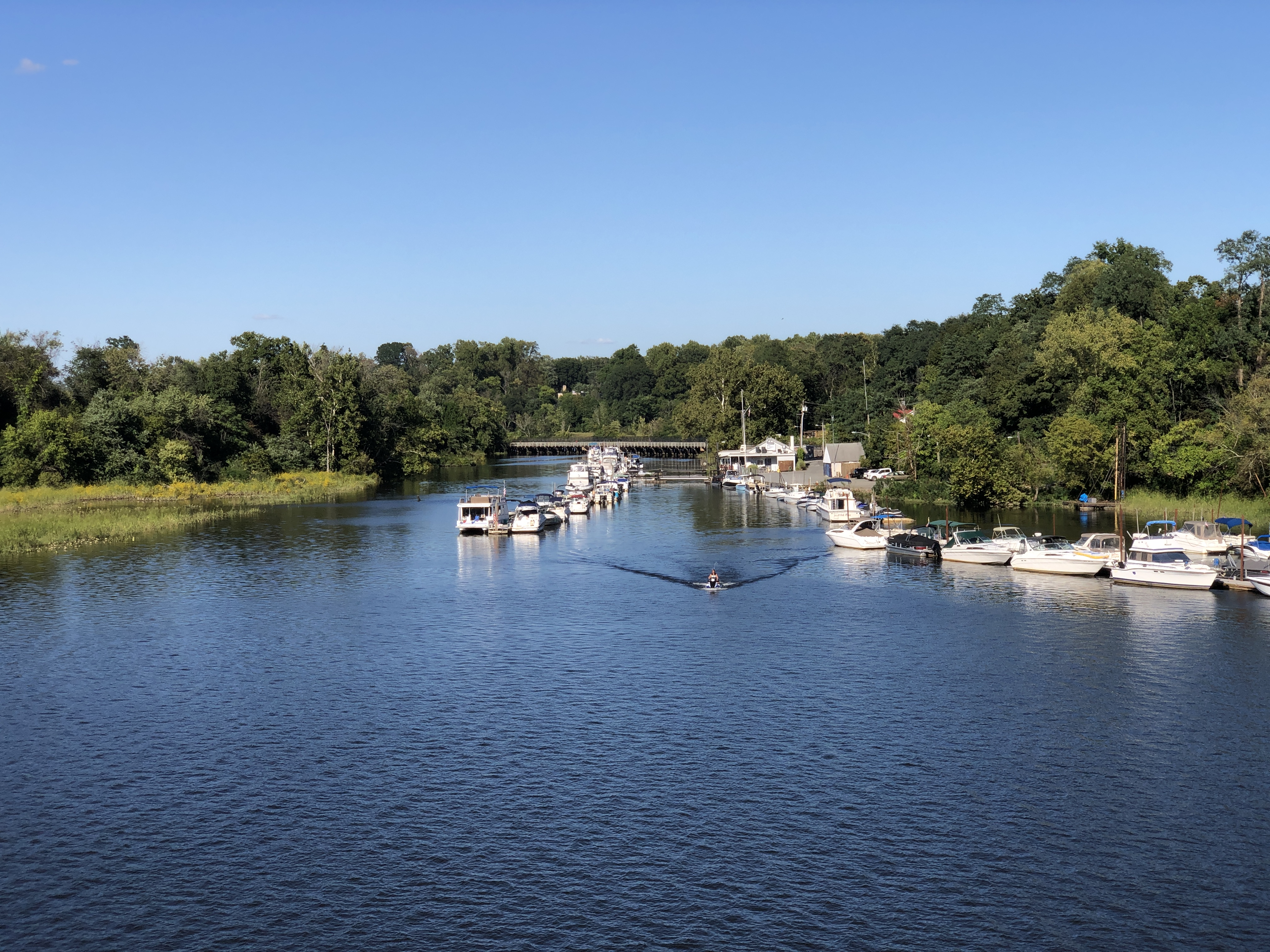
- View upstream from I-295 at the mouth of the Crosswicks Creek on the border of Bordentown and Hamilton Township

Location
- Country: United States
- State: New Jersey
- Region: Burlington County; Mercer County; Monmouth County; Ocean County

Physical characteristics
- Source
  - location: Joint Base McGuire–Dix–Lakehurst
  - coordinates: 40°03′07″N 74°32′41″W
- Mouth: Delaware River
  - location: Bordentown
  - coordinates: 40°08′57″N 74°43′12″W

Basin features
- River system: Delaware River

Crosswicks Creek is a 25.3-mile-long (40.7 km) tributary of the Delaware River in Burlington, Mercer, Monmouth and Ocean Counties in central and southern New Jersey.

== Description ==
Crosswicks Creek watershed encompasses portions of four counties in south-central New Jersey. Its headwaters flow from the Fort Dix and McGuire Air Force Base Military Reserves in a northwesterly direction and then turn sharply south where it meets the Delaware River at Bordentown Township. Due to the testing and use of military equipment, the Crosswicks Creek watershed has a set of unique concerns and is the focus of many protection and restoration activities.

In the mid 1990s, the New Jersey Department of Transportation opened the missing segment of I-295, which has significantly impacted the mouth of the Crosswicks. This area, known as the Hamilton Marsh, had many portions filled in to make way for the freeway. During construction, new wetlands were also created, but at the expense of established woodlands. There is also interference with wildlife movement patterns due to the large freeway's presence in the marsh which is cause for concern. In light of these activities, there is support for the development of a Hamilton Marsh Greenway.

== Fossils ==
Although most of the creek does not yield particularly abundant deposits of fossils, fossils from the Pleistocene and Cretaceous eras have been found. There exist patches of particularly fossiliferous deposits among mostly non-fossiliferous deposits throughout the creek's path.

== Statistics ==
- Length: 25 miles (40 km)
- Watershed Area: 146 square miles (380 km^{2})
- Headwaters: Fort Dix and McGuire Military Bases and Lahaway Creek in the Colliers Mill Wildlife Management Area
- NJ Stream Classification: FW-1 at headwaters, FW-2 Nontrout for the rest of watershed
- Land Use: Agricultural/undeveloped, forested, urban/suburban residential, commercial, and military
- Municipalities:
  - Allentown
  - Bordentown Township
  - Chesterfield
  - City of Bordentown
  - Fort Dix Military Reservation
  - Hamilton
  - Plumsted
  - New Hanover
  - North Hanover
  - Upper Freehold
  - Springfield

== Tributaries ==
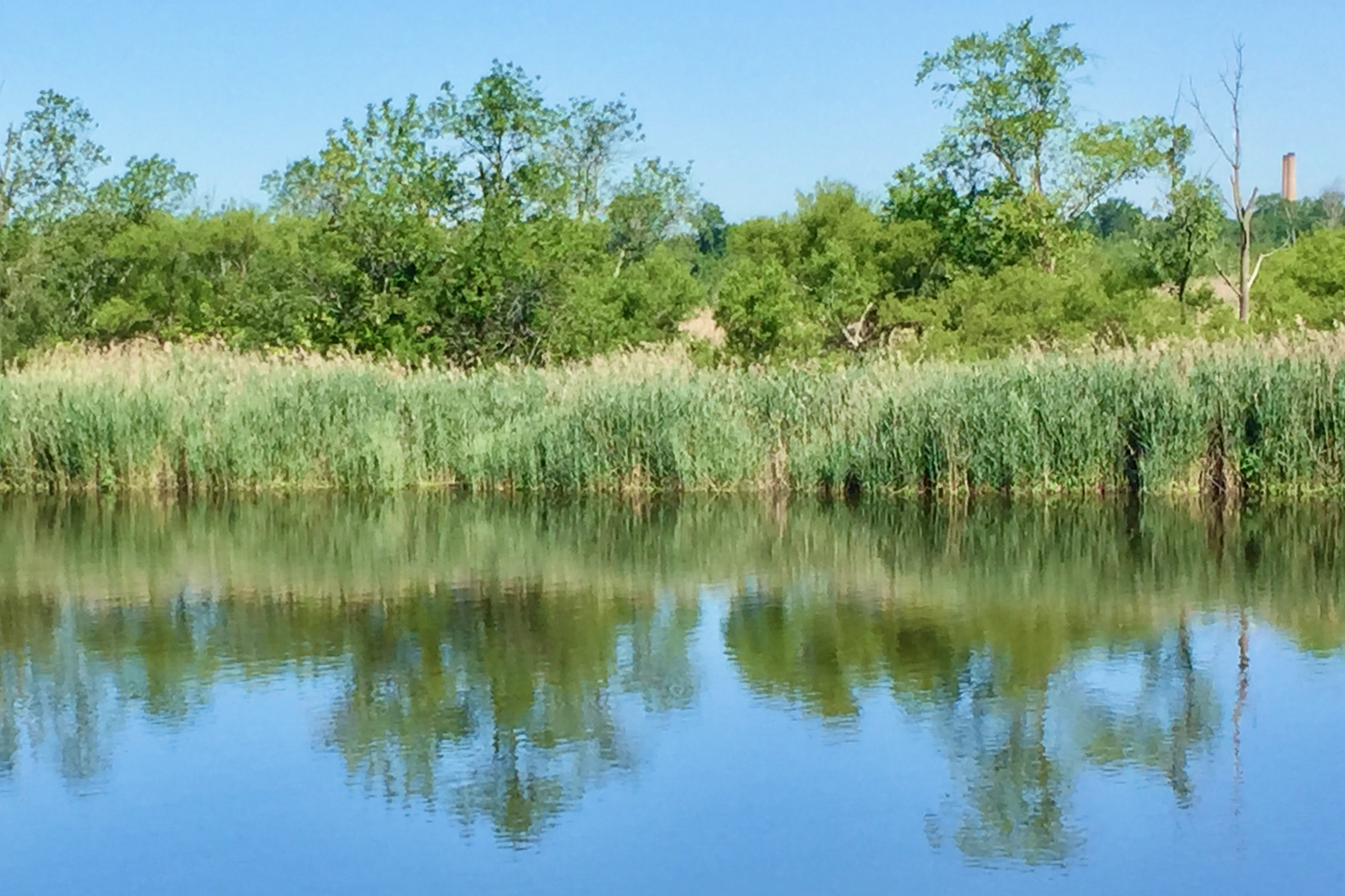
Crosswicks Creek marshlands near Bordentown Township

- Bobs Run
- Buck Brook
- Buckhole Creek
- Culvert Pond Run
- Doctors Creek
- Edges Brook
- Ivanhoe Brook
- Jumble Gut Run
- Jumping Brook
- Lahaway Creek
- Long Bog Run
- Mile Hollow Brook
- North Run
- South Run
- Thornton Creek

== Impoundments ==
- Allentown Lake
- Brindle Lake
- Conines Millpond
- Cookstown Pond
- Gropp Lake
- Hamilton Marsh
- Imlaystown Lake
- Oakford Lake
- Prospertown Lake
- Red Valley Lake

== See also ==
- List of rivers of New Jersey
- Crosswicks Creek Site III
