= Pete Reed (aid worker) =

American aid worker

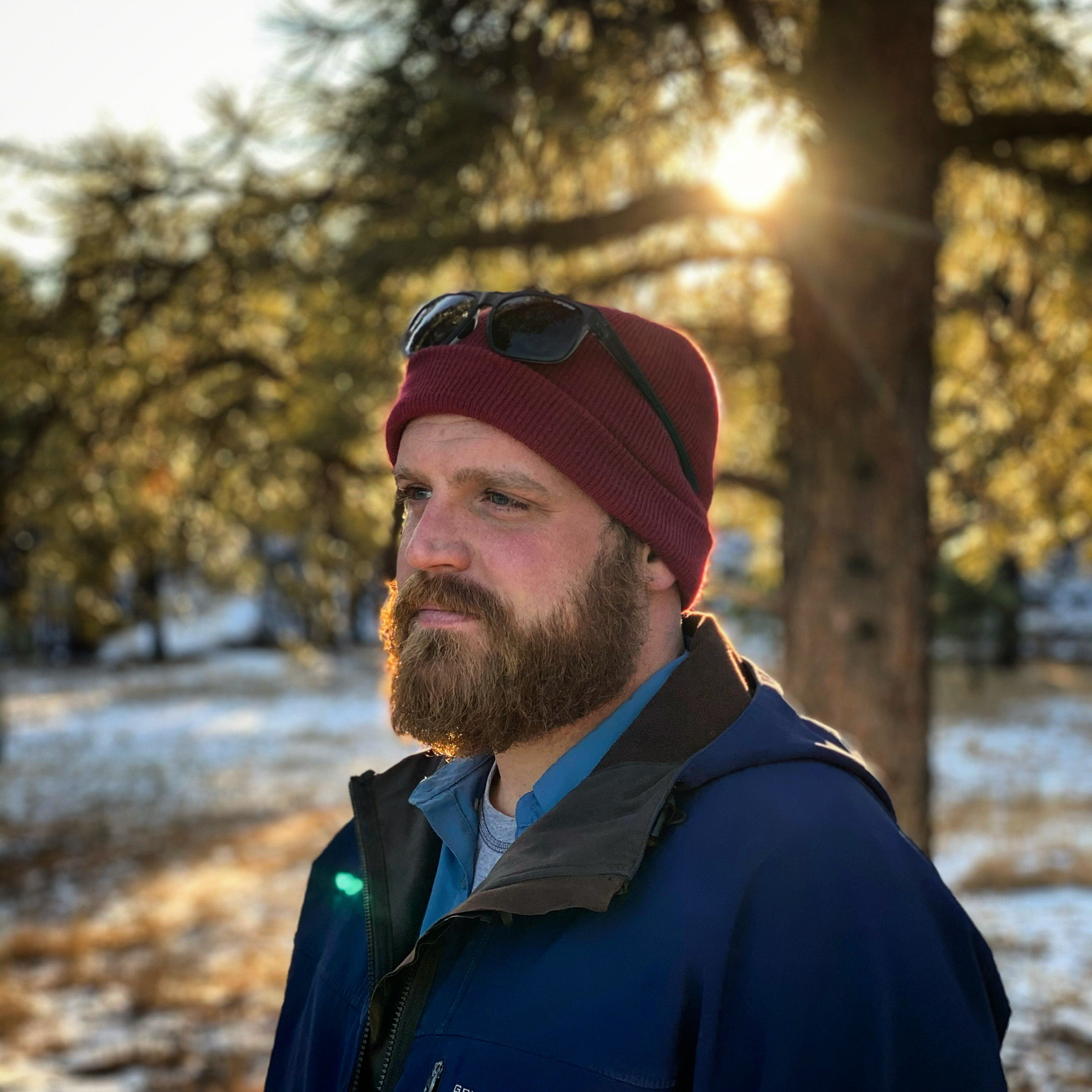
- Reed in 2021
- Born: July 9, 1989; Bordentown, New Jersey, US
- Died: February 2, 2023 (aged 33); Bakhmut, Ukraine
- Occupation: Aid worker
- Organization: Global Response Medicine
- Spouse: Alex Kay Potter

Pete Reed (9 July 1989 – 2 February 2023) was an American aid worker known for co-founding the medical humanitarian aid organization Global Response Medicine.

Raised in Bordentown, New Jersey, Reed attended Bordentown Regional High School.

Reed served as an infantryman in the Marine Corps from 2007 through 2011, doing two tours of Afghanistan. He began working after Hurricane Sandy hit in 2012 and briefly worked as a ski instructor in Jackson Hole, Wyoming. He graduated from paramedic school in June 2022.

He was profiled along with Derek Coleman on PBS NewsHour in 2016 for his volunteer work, offering medical aid in Mosul, Iraq. Global Response Medicine was founded by Reed and Coleman in early 2017. In 2023 Pete stepped away from GRM to work with Global Outreach Doctors where he was the Ukraine country director.

Reed was killed while helping to evacuate wounded civilians in Bakhmut, Ukraine on February 2, 2023. The New York Times stated that he was killed by "a targeted strike by a guided missile almost certainly fired by Russian troops."

Reed was married to photojournalist Alex Kay Potter. They met in Mosul in 2016 and were married in 2022.
