= Bordentown, New Jersey =

City in Burlington County, New Jersey, US

- City
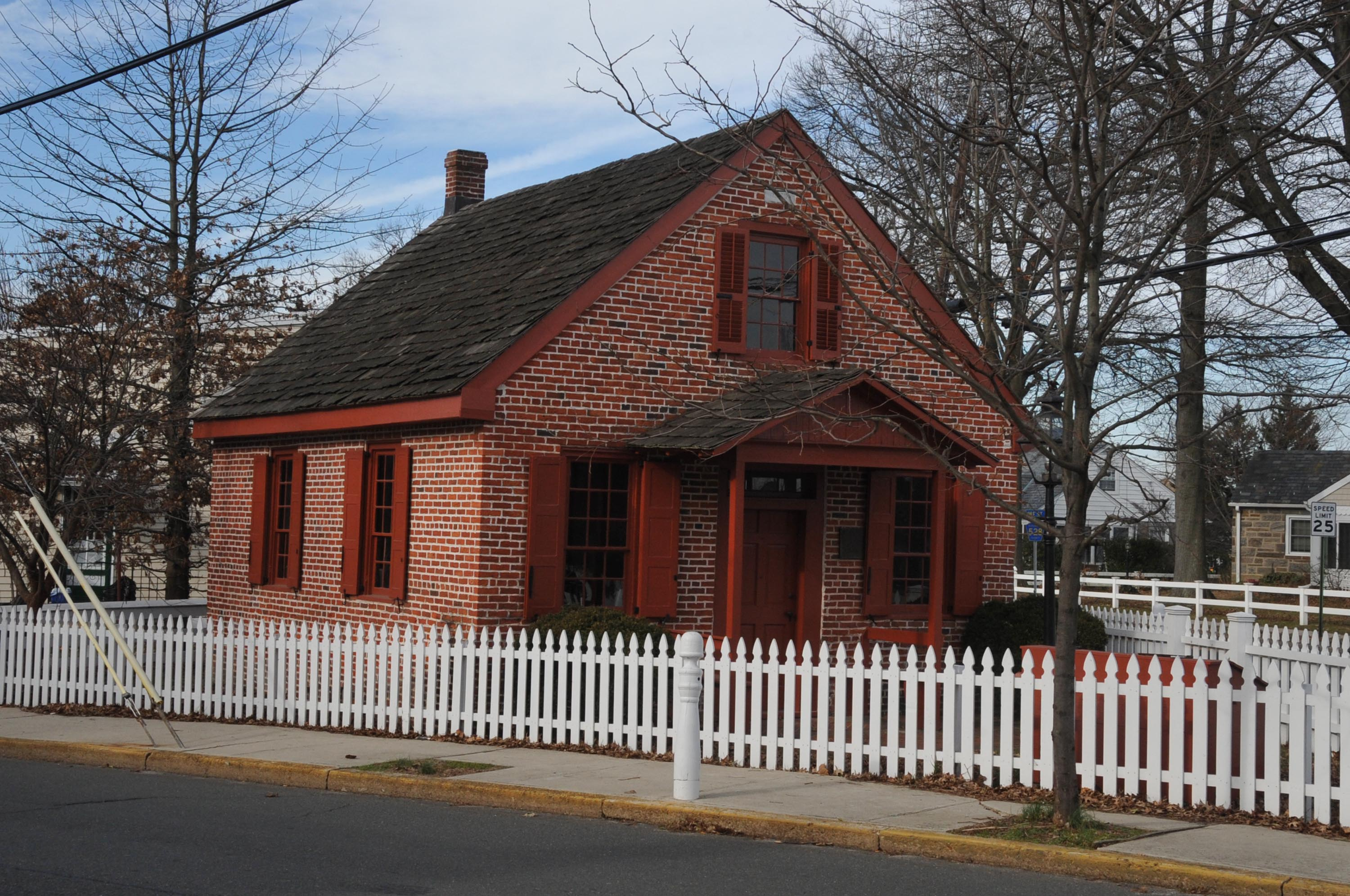
- Clara Barton Schoolhouse

- Seal

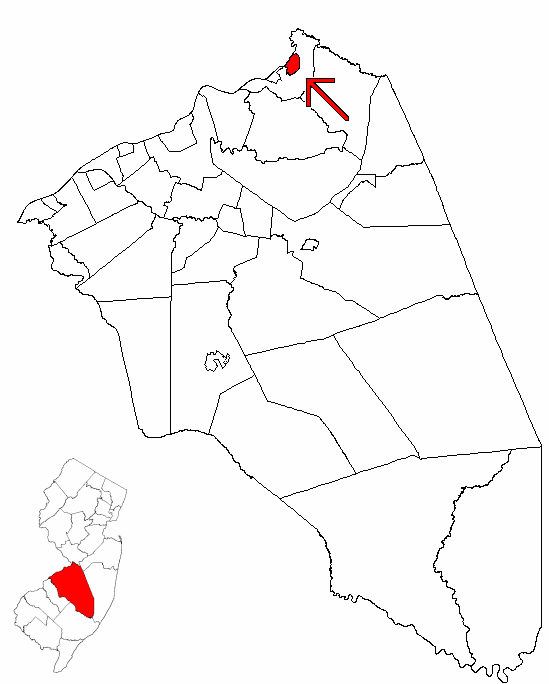
- Location of Bordentown in Burlington County highlighted in red (right). Inset map: Location of Burlington County in New Jersey highlighted in red (left).

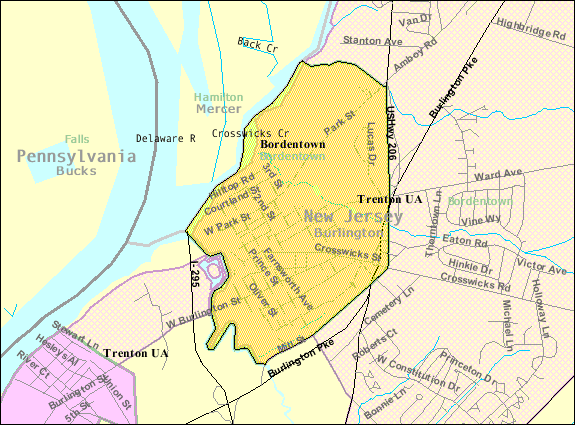
- Census Bureau map of Bordentown, New Jersey

- Location in Burlington County Location in New Jersey Location in the United States
- Coordinates: 40.149693°N 74.707679°W
- Country: United States
- State: New Jersey
- County: Burlington
- Settled: 1682
- Incorporated: December 9, 1825 (as borough)
- Reincorporated: April 3, 1867 (as city)
- Named after: Joseph Borden

Government
  - Type: Walsh Act
  - Body: Board of Commissioners
  - Mayor: Stephanie Lagos (term ends December 31, 2029)
  - Administrator: Margaret M. Peak
  - Municipal clerk: Jennifer Smith (acting)

Area
  - Total: 0.97 sq mi (2.52 km^{2})
  - Land: 0.93 sq mi (2.42 km^{2})
  - Water: 0.039 sq mi (0.10 km^{2}) 4.02%
  - Rank: 504th of 565 in state 36th of 40 in county
- Elevation: 49 ft (15 m)

Population (2020)
  - Total: 3,993
  - Estimate (2023): 4,021
  - Rank: 414th of 565 in state 31st of 40 in county
  - Density: 4,272.7/sq mi (1,649.7/km^{2})
  - Rank: 145th of 565 in state 4th of 40 in county
- Time zone: UTC−05:00 (Eastern (EST))
  - Summer (DST): UTC−04:00 (Eastern (EDT))
- ZIP Code: 08505
- Area code: 609 exchanges: 291, 298, 324, 424
- FIPS code: 3400506670
- GNIS feature ID: 0885165
- Website: www.cityofbordentown.com

Bordentown is a city in Burlington County, in the U.S. state of New Jersey. As of the 2020 United States census, the city's population was 3,993, an increase of 69 (+1.8%) from the 2010 census count of 3,924, which in turn reflected a decline of 45 (−1.1%) from the 3,969 counted in the 2000 census.

Bordentown is located at the confluence of the Delaware River, Blacks Creek, and Crosswicks Creek. The latter is the border between Burlington and Mercer counties. Bordentown is the northernmost municipality in New Jersey that is a part of the Philadelphia metropolitan area. It sits about one-third of the distance from Center City, Philadelphia to Midtown Manhattan; it is located 5.8 miles (9.3 km) south of the state capital Trenton, 27 miles (43 km) northeast of Center City Philadelphia, and 54 miles (87 km) southwest of New York City.

Bordentown's first recorded European settlement was made in 1682 in what became known as Farnsworth's Landing and, after 1717, the town that had developed in the Provence of New Jersey was renamed to Borden's Town. After the American Revolution and the establishment of the New Jersey state government, Bordentown was incorporated with a borough government form by an act of its legislature on December 9, 1825, from portions within Chesterfield Township. It was reincorporated with a city government form on April 3, 1867, and it was separated from Chesterfield Township about 1877.

== History ==
Thomas Farnsworth, an English Quaker, became the first European settler in the Bordentown area in 1682, when he moved his family upriver from Burlington. He made a new home on the windswept bluff overlooking the broad bend in the Delaware River, near today's northwest corner of Park Street and Prince Street, perhaps where an 1883 frame house now stands. "Farnsworth Landing" soon became the center of trade for the region. Farnsworth is also the namesake of one of Bordentown's main streets, Farnsworth Avenue.

Joseph Borden, for whom the city is named, arrived in 1717, and by May 1740 founded a transportation system to carry people and freight between New York City and Philadelphia. This exploited Bordentown's natural location as the point on the Delaware River that provided the shortest overland route to Perth Amboy, from which cargo and people could be ferried to New York City. The town was the childhood home of Patience Wright, America's first female sculptor, who lived there in the 1730s.

By 1776, Bordentown was full of Patriots. Joseph Borden's son (also named Joseph Borden) became a colonel during the American Revolutionary War. Other noted patriots lived in the area, including Thomas Paine. Francis Hopkinson (a signer of the United States Declaration of Independence and designer of a United States Flag), Colonel Kirkbride, and Colonel Oakey Hoagland. Hessian troops briefly occupied Bordentown in 1776 as part of the New York and New Jersey campaign before leaving to engage in the Battle of Iron Works Hill on December 23. On May 8, 1777, during the Philadelphia campaign, British forces raided Bordentown in pursuit of retreating American militiamen. The Redcoats burned several Bordentown buildings along with large quantities of American military supplies and several ships in the nearby waters. On June 23, 1778, British forces again raided Bordentown, destroying several buildings.

In August 1831, master mechanic Isaac Dripps of Bordentown re-assembled (without blueprints or instructions) the locomotive John Bull (originally called "The Stevens") in just 10 days. It was built by Robert Stephenson and Company, in England, and was imported into Philadelphia by the Camden and Amboy Railroad. The next year it started limited service, and the year after that regular service, to become one of the first successful locomotives in the United States. The John Bull is preserved at the Smithsonian Institution in Washington, D.C.

Another notable resident of Bordentown is Clara Barton, who started the first free public school in New Jersey in 1852. Barton later founded the American Red Cross. A recreation of her schoolhouse stands at the corner of Crosswicks and Burlington streets.

In 1866, Susan Waters moved into what is now one of the larger properties on Mary Street. This was a base from which she taught and produced over 50 of her works, many of which are painting of animals in natural settings and pastoral scenes. She was also an early photographer. In 1876 she was asked to exhibit several of her works at the Philadelphia Centennial Exposition.

In 1881, Rev. William Bowen purchased the old Spring Villa Female Seminary building (built on land purchased from the Bonapartes in 1837) and reopened it as the Bordentown Military Institute. In 1886, African-American Rev. Walter A. Rice established a private school for African-American children, the Manual Training and Industrial School for Colored Youth, in a two-story house at 60 West Street, which later moved to Walnut Street on the banks of the Delaware, and became a public school in 1894 under Jim Crow laws. The school, which was known as the Bordentown School, came to have a 400-acre (1.6 km^{2}), 30-building campus with two farms, a vocational/ technical orientation, and a college preparatory program. The Bordentown School operated from 1894 to 1955.

In 1909, the religious order Poor Clares established a convent in the former Motherhouse of the Sisters of Mercy on Crosswicks Street. The building still stands and is used as an assisted living community called The Clare Estate. The Order of Poor Clares moved to a new facility outside Bordentown City.

=== Joseph Bonaparte ===
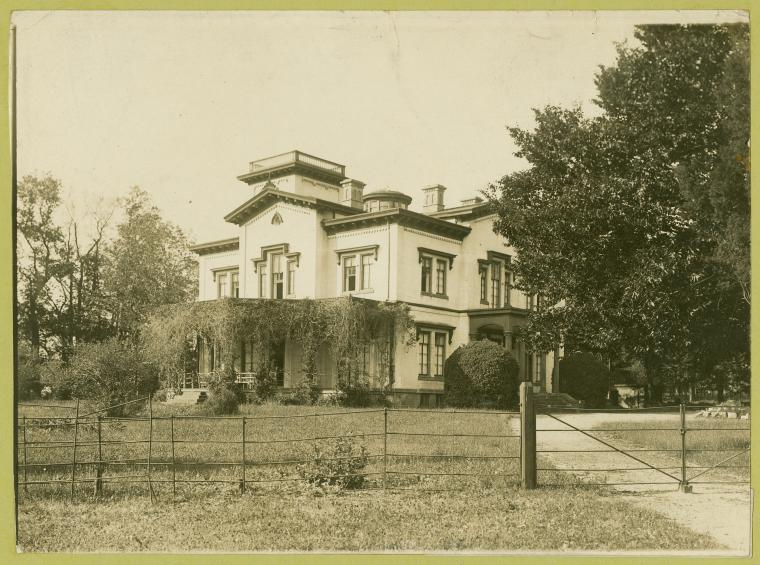
Former Bonaparte mansion, before 1923

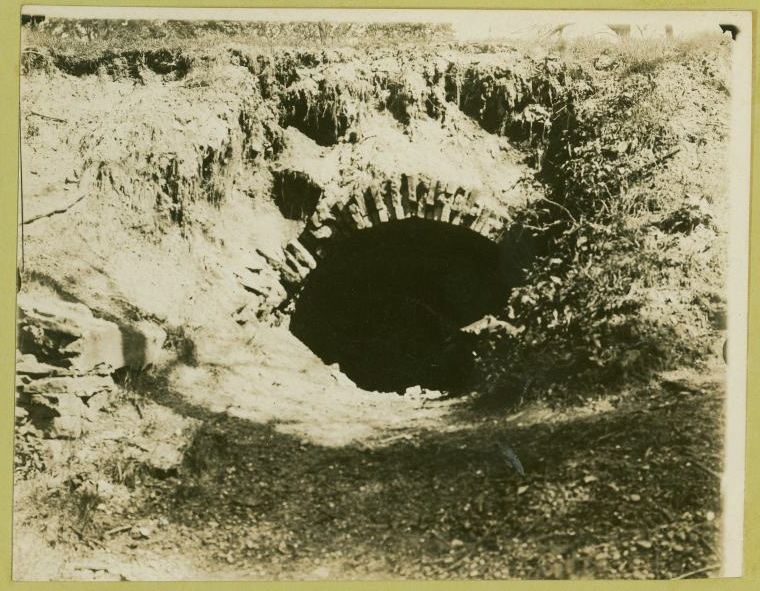
Original entrance of Bonaparte tunnel, before 1923

Several years after the banishing of his family from France in 1816, arriving under vigilant disguise as the Count de Survilliers, Joseph Bonaparte, former King of Naples and Spain and brother to Napoleon I of France, purchased the Point Breeze Estate near Bordentown from American revolutionary, Stephen Sayre. He lived there for 17 years, entertaining guests of great fame such as Henry Clay, Daniel Webster and the future 6th U.S. President, John Quincy Adams. The residents of Bordentown nicknamed the Count, "The Good Mr. Bonaparte" (Good to distinguish him from his younger brother). He built a lake near the mouth of Crosswicks Creek that was about 200 yards (200 m) wide and 1/2 mile (800 m) long. On the bluff above it he built a new home, "Point Breeze". The current Divine Word Mission occupies its former site along Park Street.

Today only vestiges of the Bonaparte estate remain. Much of it is the remains of a formerly Italianate building remodeled in English Georgian Revival style in 1924 for Harris Hammon, who purchased the estate at Point Breeze as built in 1850 by Henry Becket, a British consul in Philadelphia. In addition to the rubble of this mansion and some hedges of its elaborate gardens, only the original tunnel to the river (broken through in several places) and Bonaparte's secretary’s house remain. Many descendants of Joachim Murat, King of Naples and brother-in-law of the Bonapartes executed in 1815, also were born or lived in Bordentown, having followed their uncle Joseph there. After the Bonaparte dynasty was restored by Napoleon III, they moved back to France and were recognized as princes.

== Geography ==
According to the United States Census Bureau, the city had a total area of 0.97 square miles (2.52 km^{2}), including 0.93 square miles (2.42 km^{2}) of land and 0.04 square miles (0.10 km^{2}) of water (4.02%).

The City of Bordentown is surrounded on three sides by Bordentown Township and on the western side by the juncture of the Delaware River and Crosswicks Creek, which is the border with Hamilton Township in Mercer County. It is bounded on the east by U.S. Route 130 and U.S. Route 206, on the south by Black's Creek and Interstate 295, and on the north by the Mile Hollow Run. Across the Delaware River is Falls Township in Bucks County, Pennsylvania.

== Demographics ==
Historical population
| Census | Pop. | Note | %± |
|---|---|---|---|
| 1850 | 2,725 | | — |
| 1860 | 1,130 | | −58.5% |
| 1880 | 4,258 | | — |
| 1890 | 4,232 | | −0.6% |
| 1900 | 4,110 | | −2.9% |
| 1910 | 4,250 | | 3.4% |
| 1920 | 4,371 | | 2.8% |
| 1930 | 4,405 | | 0.8% |
| 1940 | 4,223 | | −4.1% |
| 1950 | 5,497 | | 30.2% |
| 1960 | 4,974 | | −9.5% |
| 1970 | 4,490 | | −9.7% |
| 1980 | 4,441 | | −1.1% |
| 1990 | 4,341 | | −2.3% |
| 2000 | 3,969 | | −8.6% |
| 2010 | 3,924 | | −1.1% |
| 2020 | 3,993 | | 1.8% |
| 2023 (est.) | 4,021 | | 0.7% |
Population sources: 1850–2000; 1850–1920 1850–1870; 1850 1870 1880–1890; 1890–1910 1910–1930; 1940–2000 2000; 2010 2020

=== 2020 census ===
As of the 2020 census, Bordentown had a population of 3,993. The median age was 42.3 years. 17.1% of residents were under the age of 18 and 19.3% of residents were 65 years of age or older. For every 100 females there were 90.0 males, and for every 100 females age 18 and over there were 86.9 males age 18 and over.

100.0% of residents lived in urban areas, while 0.0% lived in rural areas.

There were 1,877 households in Bordentown, of which 22.4% had children under the age of 18 living in them. Of all households, 34.3% were married-couple households, 21.6% were households with a male householder and no spouse or partner present, and 35.5% were households with a female householder and no spouse or partner present. About 39.9% of all households were made up of individuals and 14.4% had someone living alone who was 65 years of age or older.

There were 2,013 housing units, of which 6.8% were vacant. The homeowner vacancy rate was 1.0% and the rental vacancy rate was 6.9%.

Racial composition as of the 2020 census
| Race | Number | Percent |
|---|---|---|
| White | 3,125 | 78.3% |
| Black or African American | 341 | 8.5% |
| American Indian and Alaska Native | 9 | 0.2% |
| Asian | 97 | 2.4% |
| Native Hawaiian and Other Pacific Islander | 0 | 0.0% |
| Some other race | 108 | 2.7% |
| Two or more races | 313 | 7.8% |
| Hispanic or Latino (of any race) | 338 | 8.5% |

=== 2010 census ===
The 2010 United States census counted 3,924 people, 1,859 households, and 922 families in the city. The population density was 4,222.3 per square mile (1,630.2/km^{2}). There were 2,014 housing units at an average density of 2,167.1 per square mile (836.7/km^{2}). The racial makeup was 83.51% (3,277) White, 10.12% (397) Black or African American, 0.20% (8) Native American, 2.73% (107) Asian, 0.03% (1) Pacific Islander, 1.17% (46) from other races, and 2.24% (88) from two or more races. Hispanic or Latino of any race were 5.81% (228) of the population.

Of the 1,859 households, 21.3% had children under the age of 18; 32.4% were married couples living together; 13.5% had a female householder with no husband present and 50.4% were non-families. Of all households, 41.3% were made up of individuals and 14.0% had someone living alone who was 65 years of age or older. The average household size was 2.10 and the average family size was 2.91.

18.4% of the population were under the age of 18, 8.2% from 18 to 24, 30.8% from 25 to 44, 29.2% from 45 to 64, and 13.5% who were 65 years of age or older. The median age was 40.3 years. For every 100 females, the population had 91.1 males. For every 100 females ages 18 and older there were 87.1 males.

The Census Bureau's 2006–2010 American Community Survey showed that (in 2010 inflation-adjusted dollars) median household income was $66,557 (with a margin of error of +/− $9,567) and the median family income was $90,165 (+/− $11,644). Males had a median income of $52,652 (+/− $10,201) versus $48,906 (+/− $9,108) for females. The per capita income for the borough was $36,814 (+/− $3,714). About 1.7% of families and 3.6% of the population were below the poverty line, including none of those under age 18 and 12.1% of those age 65 or over.

=== 2000 census ===
As of the 2000 United States census there were 3,969 people, 1,757 households, and 989 families residing in the city. The population density was 4,303.6 inhabitants per square mile (1,661.6/km^{2}). There were 1,884 housing units at an average density of 2,042.8 per square mile (788.7/km^{2}). The racial makeup of the city was 81.25% White, 13.08% African American, 0.05% Native American, 1.91% Asian, 0.03% Pacific Islander, 0.81% from other races, and 2.87% from two or more races. Hispanic or Latino of any race were 2.82% of the population.

There were 1,757 households, out of which 24.9% had children under the age of 18 living with them, 39.2% were married couples living together, 13.1% had a female householder with no husband present, and 43.7% were non-families. 35.7% of all households were made up of individuals, and 10.9% had someone living alone who was 65 years of age or older. The average household size was 2.23 and the average family size was 2.93.

In the city the population was spread out, with 20.9% under the age of 18, 7.7% from 18 to 24, 34.2% from 25 to 44, 23.2% from 45 to 64, and 14.0% who were 65 years of age or older. The median age was 38 years. For every 100 females, there were 90.1 males. For every 100 females age 18 and over, there were 86.5 males.

The median income for a household in the city was $47,279, and the median income for a family was $59,872. Males had a median income of $39,909 versus $31,780 for females. The per capita income for the city was $25,882. About 4.0% of families and 6.8% of the population were below the poverty line, including 7.8% of those under age 18 and 10.9% of those age 65 or over.

== Economy ==
Downtown Bordentown has record, book and antique stores lining its streets, with two coffee shops, two breweries, an ice cream shop, a candy shop, a couple of pubs and restaurants with Italian, Chinese, Argentinean-inspired menus. The city hosts street fairs a couple times a year, a Halloween parade, garden tours, car shows, etc. Bordentown is a walkable city with a wide variety of establishments.

== Government ==
=== Local government ===
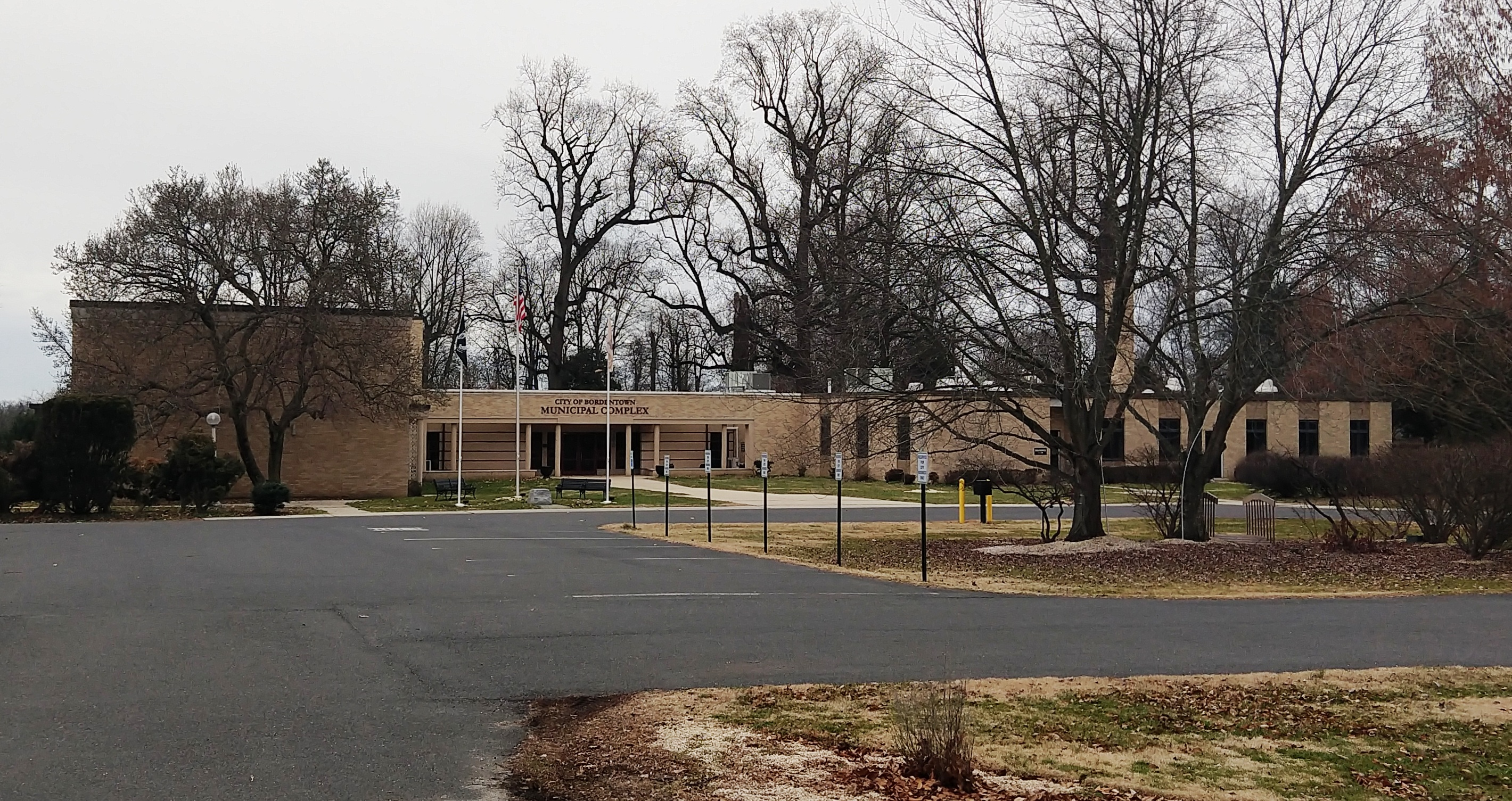
Bordentown City Hall in 2023

Bordentown has been governed under the Walsh Act since 1913. The city is one of 30 municipalities (of the 564) statewide that use this commission form of government. The governing body is comprised of three commissioners, one of whom is selected to serve as Mayor. Each commissioner is assigned a specific department to oversee during their term in office. Members are elected at-large to four-year concurrent terms of office on a non-partisan basis as part of the May municipal election.

As of 2024, Bordentown's commissioners are Mayor Jennifer L. Sciortino (Director of Revenue and Finance), Deputy Mayor Joe Myers (Director of Public Property, Streets and Water) and Commissioner Heather Cheesman (Director of Public Safety and Affairs; appointed to an unexpired term), all serving terms of office that end on May 13, 2025.

In March 2024, the commissioners appointed Heather Cheesman to fill the seat that had been held by James E. Lynch Jr., until he resigned from office; Cheeseman will serve on an interim basis until the November 2024 general election, when voters will choose a candidate to serve the balance of the term of office.

The city's municipal complex is located on the site of the Point Breeze estate. Part of the site was purchased by the city in 2020 from the Divine Word Missionaries who occupied the 60-acre (24-hectare) site previously. The repurposed building opened in August 2022. The former city hall was located at 324 Farnsworth Avenue.

==== Emergency services ====
Hope Hose Humane Fire Company 1 dates its founding to 1767, making it the nation's second-oldest volunteer fire service, having taken its current name from the combination in 1976 of the Hope Hose and the Humane fire companies.

Consolidated Fire Association dates back to the 1966 merger of three separate volunteer fire companies.

==== Environmental Commission ====
The Bordentown City Environmental Commission (BCEC) is a volunteer group of Bordentown City residents. The Commission is an official body, and its chair answers to the Mayor. The BCEC advises local officials and the Planning Board regarding environmental issues and is a watchdog for environmental problems and opportunities. It is designed to inform elected officials and the public, serve on committees, research issues, develop educational programs and advocate for sound environmental policies. Local issues include preservation of open space, promoting walking and bicycling trails and the River Line, protection of wetlands and water quality, recycling and energy conservation, and environmental education.

The BCEC's most current efforts have focuses upon a bicycle and pedestrian circulation study, the City's open space plan, and the development of a set of local greenways (Thorntown and Black Creek).

==== State government facilities ====
The New Jersey Juvenile Justice Commission operates two juvenile detention centers in the Johnstone Campus in Bordentown: Johnstone Campus Juvenile Female Secure Care and Intake Facility, which houses the state's adjudicated girls, and Juvenile Medium Security Facility-North Compound (JMSF-N) and the Juvenile Medium Security Facility-South Compound (JMSF-S) for boys.

=== Federal, state and county representation ===
Bordentown City is located in the 3rd Congressional District and is part of New Jersey's 7th state legislative district. Prior to the 2011 reapportionment following the 2010 census, Bordentown City had been in the 30th state legislative district. Prior to the 2010 Census, Bordentown City had been part of the 4th Congressional District, a change made by the New Jersey Redistricting Commission that took effect in January 2013, based on the results of the November 2012 general elections.

For the 119th United States Congress, New Jersey's 3rd congressional district is currently represented Herb Conaway (D, Delran Township). New Jersey is represented in the United States Senate by Democrats Cory Booker (Newark, term ends 2027) and Andy Kim (Moorestown, term ends 2031).

For the 2026–2027 session, the 7th legislative district of the New Jersey Legislature is represented in the State Senate by Troy Singleton (D, Palmyra) and in the General Assembly by Carol A. Murphy (D, Mount Laurel) and Balvir Singh (D, Burlington Township).

Burlington County is governed by a Board of County Commissioners comprised of five members who are chosen at-large in partisan elections to serve three-year terms of office on a staggered basis, with either one or two seats coming up for election each year; at an annual reorganization meeting, the board selects a director and deputy director from among its members to serve a one-year term. As of 2026, Burlington County's Commissioners are: Director Felicia Hopson (D, Willingboro Township, term as commissioner ends December 31, 2027; term as director ends 2026), Deputy Director Allison Eckel (D, Medford, term as commissioner ends 2028; term as deputy director ends 2026), Randy Brolo (D, Lumberton, 2026; elected to an unexpired term), Tyler Burrell (D, Delran Township, 2027) and Tom Pullion (D, Edgewater Park, 2026).

Burlington County's constitutional officers are Clerk Joanne Schwartz (D, Southampton Township, 2028), Sheriff James H. Kostoplis (D, Bordentown, 2028) and Surrogate Brian J. Carlin (D, Burlington Township, 2026).

=== Politics ===
United States presidential election results for Bordentown 2024 2020 2016 2012 2008 2004
| Year | Republican | | Democratic | | Third party(ies) | |
| Year | No. | % | No. | % | No. | % |
|---|---|---|---|---|---|---|
| 2024 | 603 | 29.34% | 1,409 | 68.56% | 43 | 2.09% |
| 2020 | 750 | 31.73% | 1,564 | 66.16% | 50 | 2.12% |
| 2016 | 659 | 32.66% | 1,231 | 61.00% | 128 | 6.34% |
| 2012 | 605 | 31.23% | 1,298 | 67.01% | 34 | 1.76% |
| 2008 | 669 | 33.47% | 1,305 | 65.28% | 25 | 1.25% |
| 2004 | 778 | 39.98% | 1,151 | 59.15% | 17 | 0.87% |

As of March 2011, there were a total of 2,493 registered voters in Bordentown City, of which 906 (36.3% vs. 33.3% countywide) were registered as Democrats, 500 (20.1% vs. 23.9%) were registered as Republicans and 1,085 (43.5% vs. 42.8%) were registered as Unaffiliated. There were 2 voters registered as either Libertarians or Greens. Among the city's 2010 Census population, 63.5% (vs. 61.7% in Burlington County) were registered to vote, including 77.9% of those ages 18 and over (vs. 80.3% countywide).

In the 2012 presidential election, Democrat Barack Obama received 1,298 votes (66.4% vs. 58.1% countywide), ahead of Republican Mitt Romney with 605 votes (31.0% vs. 40.2%) and other candidates with 34 votes (1.7% vs. 1.0%), among the 1,954 ballots cast by the city's 2,634 registered voters, for a turnout of 74.2% (vs. 74.5% in Burlington County). In the 2008 presidential election, Democrat Barack Obama received 1,305 votes (64.8% vs. 58.4% countywide), ahead of Republican John McCain with 669 votes (33.2% vs. 39.9%) and other candidates with 25 votes (1.2% vs. 1.0%), among the 2,015 ballots cast by the city's 2,543 registered voters, for a turnout of 79.2% (vs. 80.0% in Burlington County). In the 2004 presidential election, Democrat John Kerry received 1,151 votes (58.7% vs. 52.9% countywide), ahead of Republican George W. Bush with 778 votes (39.7% vs. 46.0%) and other candidates with 17 votes (0.9% vs. 0.8%), among the 1,961 ballots cast by the city's 2,488 registered voters, for a turnout of 78.8% (vs. 78.8% in the whole county).

Gubernatorial election results for Bordentown
| Year | Republican | | Democratic | | Third party(ies) | |
| Year | No. | % | No. | % | No. | % |
|---|---|---|---|---|---|---|
| 2025 | 581 | 29.63% | 1,368 | 69.76% | 12 | 0.61% |
| 2021 | 565 | 35.99% | 988 | 62.93% | 17 | 1.08% |
| 2017 | 439 | 31.88% | 893 | 64.85% | 45 | 3.27% |
| 2013 | 661 | 52.05% | 579 | 45.59% | 30 | 2.36% |
| 2009 | 553 | 39.30% | 714 | 50.75% | 140 | 9.95% |
| 2005 | 540 | 41.16% | 698 | 53.20% | 74 | 5.64% |

In the 2013 gubernatorial election, Republican Chris Christie received 661 votes (51.0% vs. 61.4% countywide), ahead of Democrat Barbara Buono with 579 votes (44.7% vs. 35.8%) and other candidates with 30 votes (2.3% vs. 1.2%), among the 1,295 ballots cast by the city's 2,658 registered voters, yielding a 48.7% turnout (vs. 44.5% in the county). In the 2009 gubernatorial election, Democrat Jon Corzine received 714 ballots cast (50.1% vs. 44.5% countywide), ahead of Republican Chris Christie with 553 votes (38.8% vs. 47.7%), Independent Chris Daggett with 86 votes (6.0% vs. 4.8%) and other candidates with 54 votes (3.8% vs. 1.2%), among the 1,424 ballots cast by the city's 2,567 registered voters, yielding a 55.5% turnout (vs. 44.9% in the county).

United States Senate election results for Bordentown1
| Year | Republican | | Democratic | | Third party(ies) | |
| Year | No. | % | No. | % | No. | % |
|---|---|---|---|---|---|---|
| 2024 | 516 | 25.81% | 1,440 | 72.04% | 43 | 2.15% |
| 2018 | 591 | 32.76% | 1,100 | 60.98% | 113 | 6.26% |
| 2012 | 601 | 32.91% | 1,190 | 65.17% | 35 | 1.92% |
| 2006 | 464 | 39.29% | 685 | 58.00% | 32 | 2.71% |

United States Senate election results for Bordentown2
| Year | Republican | | Democratic | | Third party(ies) | |
| Year | No. | % | No. | % | No. | % |
|---|---|---|---|---|---|---|
| 2020 | 731 | 31.65% | 1,531 | 66.28% | 48 | 2.08% |
| 2014 | 365 | 33.36% | 693 | 63.35% | 36 | 3.29% |
| 2013 | 269 | 34.40% | 503 | 64.32% | 10 | 1.28% |
| 2008 | 655 | 35.73% | 1,144 | 62.41% | 34 | 1.85% |

== Education ==
=== Public schools ===
Public school students in pre-kindergarten through twelfth grades attend the schools of the Bordentown Regional School District, which serves students from Bordentown City, Bordentown Township and Fieldsboro Borough. As of the 2023–24 school year, the district, comprised of five schools, had an enrollment of 2,232 students and 190.0 classroom teachers (on an FTE basis), for a student–teacher ratio of 11.8:1. Schools in the district (with 2023–24 enrollment data from the National Center for Education Statistics) are Clara Barton Elementary School with 215 students in grades K–2 (generally serves Bordentown City and the Holloway Meadows section of Bordentown Township), Peter Muschal Elementary School with 480 students in grades PreK–5 (generally serves remainder of Bordentown Township and the Borough of Fieldsboro), MacFarland Intermediate School with 247 students in grades 3–5, Bordentown Regional Middle School with 505 students in grades 6–8 and Bordentown Regional High School with 762 students in grades 9–12. The board's nine seats are allocated based on the population of the constituent municipalities, with three seats assigned to Bordentown City.

The New Hanover Township School District, consisting of New Hanover Township (including its Cookstown area) and Wrightstown Borough, sends students to Bordentown Regional High School on a tuition basis for ninth through twelfth grades as part of a sending/receiving relationship that has been in place since the 1960s, with about 50 students from the New Hanover district being sent to the high school. As of 2011, the New Hanover district was considering expansion of its relationship to send students to Bordentown for middle school for grades 6–8.

Students from Bordentown, and from all of Burlington County, are eligible to attend the Burlington County Institute of Technology, a countywide public school district that serves the vocational and technical education needs of students at the high school and post-secondary level at its campuses in Medford and Westampton.

=== Private schools ===
Saint Mary School was a Catholic school serving students in Pre-K–8, that operated for over 100 years under the auspices of the Roman Catholic Diocese of Trenton. The school closed its doors in June 2013 due to the school's financial challenges in the face of enrollment that was half of the 220 students needed to remain financially viable.

The Bordentown Military Institute was located in the city from 1881 to 1972. The Society of the Divine Word fathers operated a minor seminary in Bordentown from 1947 to 1983. One of its more notable alumni Douglas Palmer was the four-term mayor of Trenton, New Jersey, leaving office in 2009.

== Transportation ==
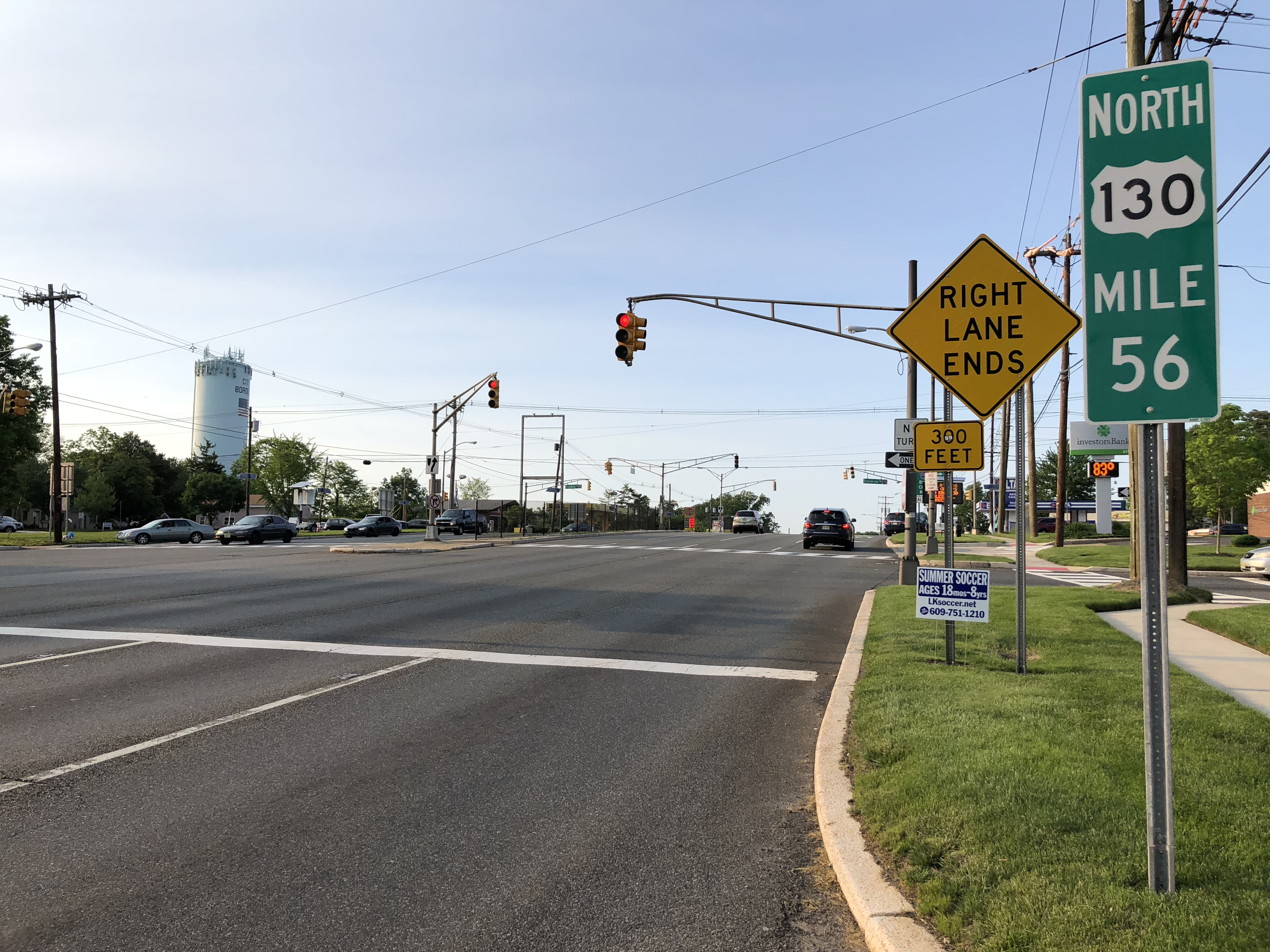
U.S. Route 130 / U.S. Route 206 at County Route 528 in Bordentown

=== Roads and highways ===
As of May 2010, the city had a total of 12.73 miles (20.49 km) of roadways, of which 10.09 miles (16.24 km) were maintained by the municipality, 2.25 miles (3.62 km) by Burlington County and 0.39 miles (0.63 km) by the New Jersey Department of Transportation.

U.S. Route 130 and U.S. Route 206 run through very briefly and intersect at County Route 528 in the city. In addition to CR 528's western terminus in Bordentown, County Route 545 has its northern terminus in the city. The New Jersey Turnpike (Interstate 95) passes through neighboring Bordentown Township with access at interchange 7 to U.S. Route 206, which is signed as Bordentown-Trenton. Interstate 295 also passes through Bordentown Township and has two interchanges that take travelers into Bordentown: exit 56 and exit 57.

=== Public transportation ===
The Bordentown station at Park Street offers service between the Trenton Rail Station in Trenton and the Walter Rand Transportation Center (and other stations) in Camden, on NJ Transit's River Line Light rail system.

NJ Transit provides bus service in the township between Trenton and Philadelphia on the 409 route.

== Religion ==
Bordentown City's one square mile is home to more than 10 houses of worship, including: American Presbyterian Church, B'nai Abraham Synagogue, Christ Episcopal Church, Dorothea Dix Unitarian Universalist Community, Ebenezer Full Gospel Community Church, First Baptist Church of Bordentown, First Presbyterian Church, Mount Zion AME Church, Saint Mary's Roman Catholic Church, Shiloh Baptist Church, Trinity United Methodist Church and Union Baptist Church.

== Points of interest ==
The city has become a destination for weekend dining as well as for the casual perusal of its book and record stores, historical sites and art galleries. The active downtown business association sponsors an annual Iris Festival & Art Show in early May, an annual Street Fair in mid- to late May, and an annual Cranberry Festival in early October. The Bordentown Historical Society sponsors events, such as the Holiday House Tour and Peach Social.

The Historical Society hosts exhibits at the Bordentown Friends Meeting House each year, and the 2022 exhibition consists of artifacts collected from Joseph Bonaparte which led to a visit from Philippe Étienne, the ambassador of France to the United States.

Crosswicks Creek Site III, an archaeological site from the American Revolutionary War era, was added to the National Register of Historic Places in 1990 for its significance in military and maritime history.

Point Breeze, the former estate of Joseph Bonaparte, was added to the NRHP in 1997 for its significance in architecture, landscape architecture, and politics/government.

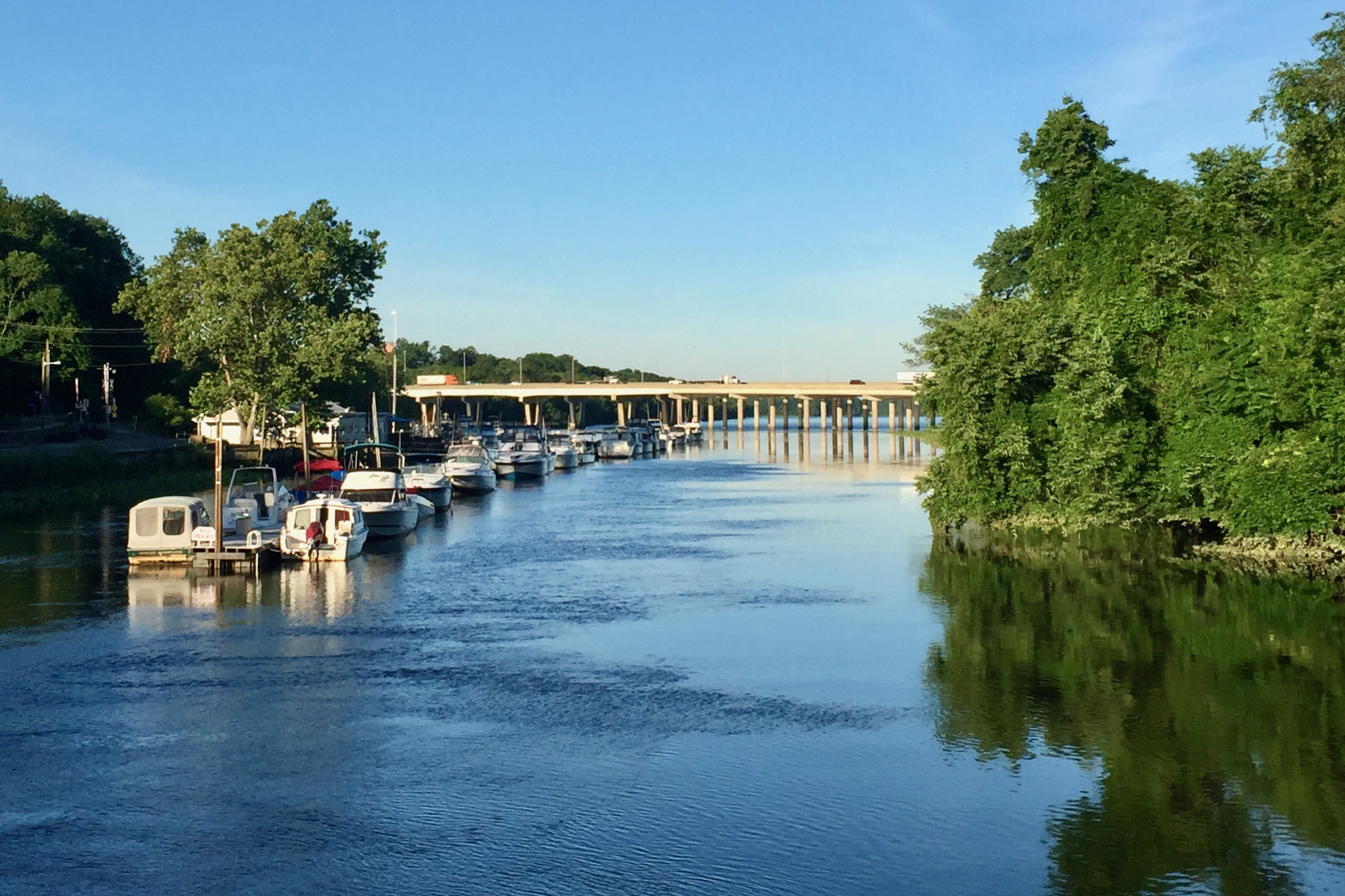
Crosswicks Creek Site III

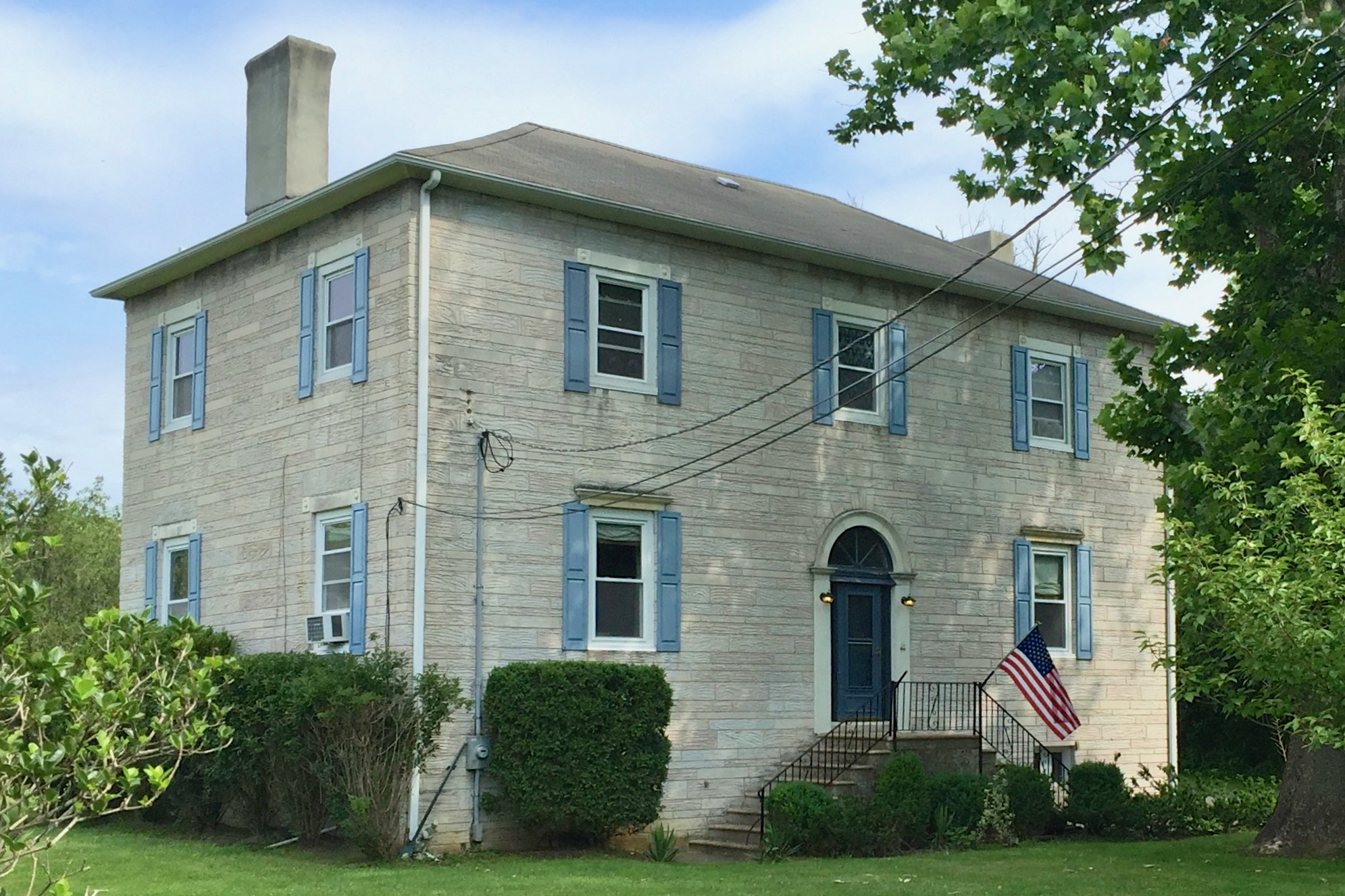
Point Breeze

== Notable people ==
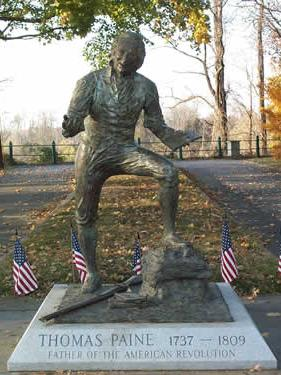
This statue on Prince Street honors Thomas Paine, who periodically lived in Bordentown

People who were born in, residents of, or otherwise closely associated with Bordentown include:

- Burgiss Allison (1753–1827), Chaplain of the United States House of Representatives from 1816–1820
- Ricardo Almeida (born 1976), Brazilian-American mixed martial artist and Brazilian jiu-jitsu grappler
- Al Aronowitz (1928–2005), rock journalist who claimed that Bob Dylan wrote his famous "Mr. Tambourine Man" in Aronowitz's former Berkeley Heights home
- Clara Barton (1821–1912), in 1852 started the first free public school in New Jersey and later founded the American Red Cross
- Charlotte Bonaparte (1802–1839), artist and daughter of Joseph Bonaparte, whose works included a series of landscape paintings of New Jersey scenes
- Joseph Bonaparte (1768–1844), King of Naples and Sicily, King of Spain and the Indies and brother to Napoleon I of France
- Denise Borino-Quinn (1964–2010), actress who played the role of Ginny Sacramoni, the wife of New York mob boss Johnny Sack in The Sopranos
- Herb Conaway (born 1963), member of the New Jersey General Assembly who has represented the 7th Legislative District since 1988
- Erica Dambach (born 1975), head coach of Penn State Nittany Lions women's soccer team
- Robert Duncan (born 1948), Anglican bishop who was the first primate and archbishop of the Anglican Church in North America (ACNA), serving from June 2009 to June 2014
- Dionne Farris (born 1968), singer-songwriter best known for her work as a vocalist with the hip-hop group Arrested Development
- Samuel C. Forker (1821–1900), represented New Jersey's 2nd congressional district in the United States House of Representatives from 1871–1873
- Peter Gamble (1793–1814), midshipman who was killed in action at the Battle of Lake Champlain during the War of 1812
- Richard Watson Gilder (1844–1909), poet, author and editor of The Century Magazine
- Eric Hamilton (born 1953), retired American football coach, who was head football coach at The College of New Jersey from 1977 through 2012
- Francis Hopkinson (1737–1791), author who was one of the signers of the Declaration of Independence and designer of an early United States Flag
- Joseph Mailliard (1873–1945), ornithologist who served as a curator of ornithology at the California Academy of Sciences
- Joachim, 4th Prince Murat (1834–1901), Major-General in the French Army
- Gia Maione (1941–2013), singer who was the wife of singer Louis Prima
- Joseph R. Malone (born 1949), former member of the New Jersey General Assembly who served as Bordentown's mayor from 1973 to 1993 and 2013 to 2017
- Edward McCall (1790–1853), officer in the United States Navy during the War of 1812 who was awarded a Congressional Gold Medal
- Joseph Menna (born 1974), sculptor
- Rob Novak (born 1986), runner who specialized in the 800 meters
- Thomas Paine (1737–1809), American and French Revolution inspiration and author of many works, including "Common Sense" and "The Rights of Man"
- Chris Prynoski (born 1971), animator
- Pete Reed (1989–2023), aid worker known for co-founding the medical humanitarian aid organization Global Response Medicine
- Danny Sammons (born 1984), former professional stock car racing driver who competed in the NASCAR Whelen Modified Tour
- Joshua Shaw (1776–1860), English-American artist and inventor
- Harry W. Shipps (1926–2016), eighth Bishop of Georgia
- Charles Stewart (1778–1869), United States Navy admiral, resided in Bordentown at the time of his death in 1869
- Ishod Wair (born 1991), professional skateboarder who was Thrasher magazine's Skater of the Year 2013
- Susan Waters (1823–1900), painter and photographer, who was active in the suffrage movement and in animal rights causes
- Joseph Wright (1756–1793), artist and engraver who is credited as the designer of the Liberty Cap Large Cent
- Patience Wright (1725–1786), America's first native-born sculptor
- Joshua M. Zeitz (born 1974), historian and writer who ran unsuccessfully for Congress in 2008 and served as a policy adviser to the Corzine Administration
- August Zeller (1863–1918), sculptor who was a student of Thomas Eakins and Auguste Rodin
