= Bordentown Township, New Jersey =

Township in Burlington County, New Jersey, US

- Township
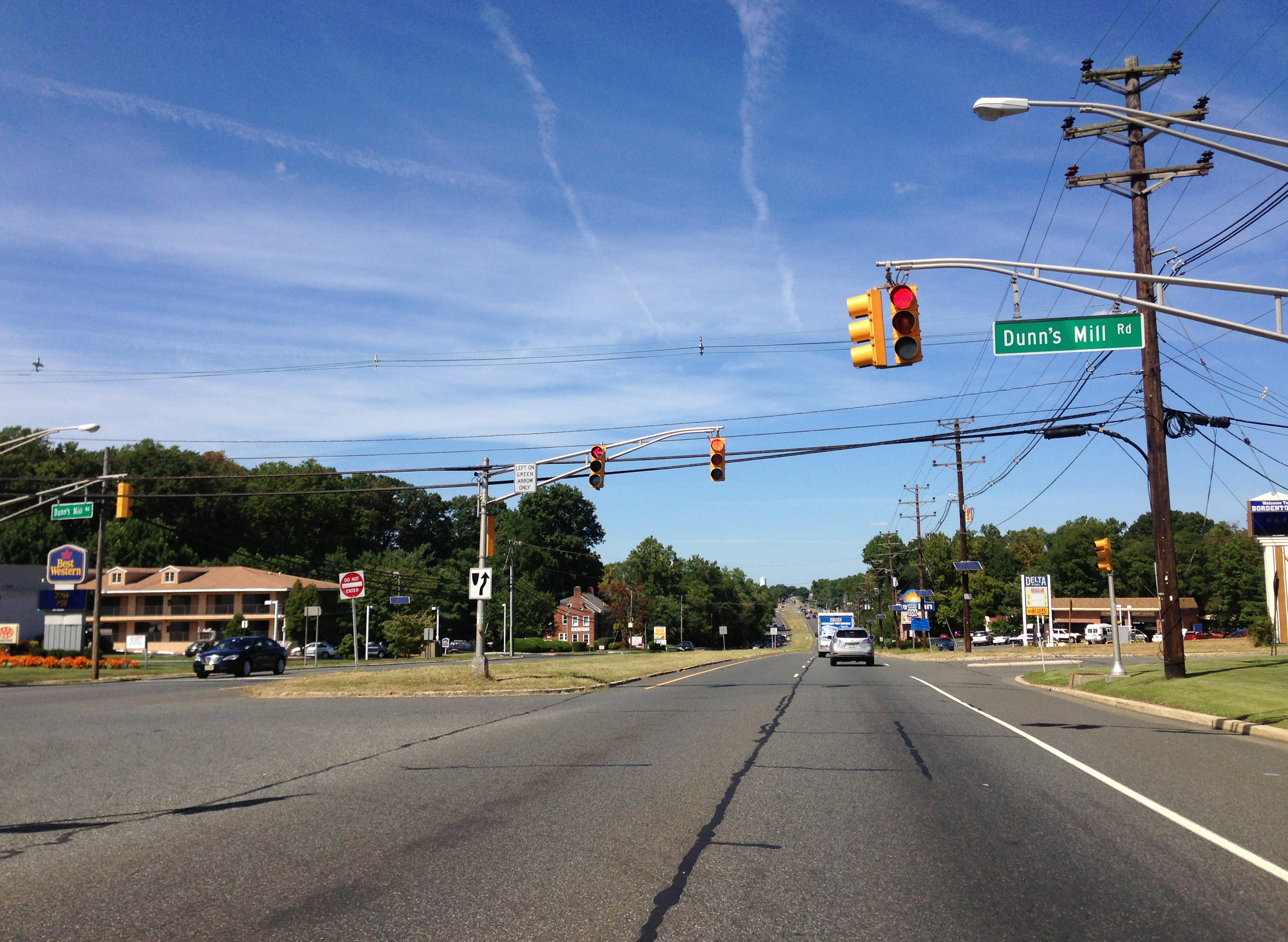
- U.S. Route 206 northbound in Bordentown Township

- Seal

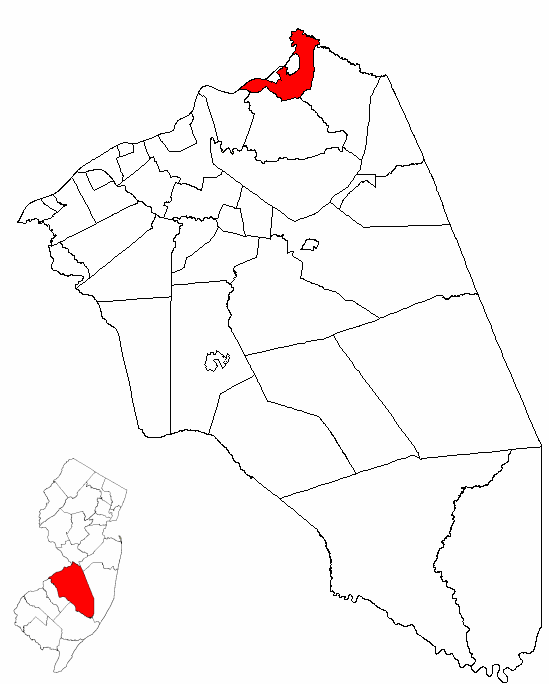
- Location of Bordentown Township in Burlington County highlighted in red (right). Inset map: Location of Burlington County in New Jersey highlighted in red (left).

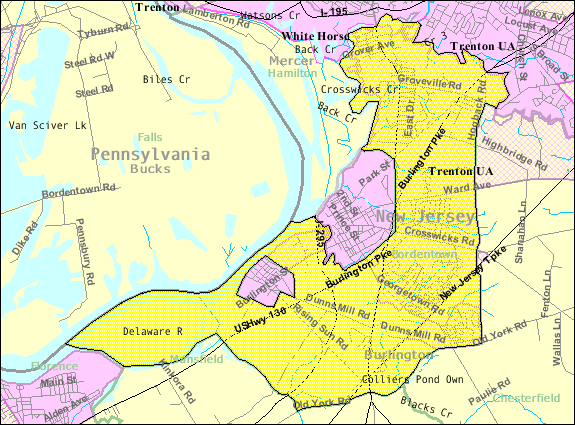
- Census Bureau map of Bordentown Township, New Jersey

- Location in Burlington County Location in New Jersey Location in the United States
- Coordinates: 40.12732°N 74.755339°W
- Country: United States
- State: New Jersey
- County: Burlington
- Incorporated: March 8, 1852
- Named after: Joseph Borden

Government
  - Type: Township
  - Body: Township Committee
  - Mayor: Aneka Miller (D, term ends December 31, 2026)
  - Administrator: Michael P. Theokas
  - Municipal clerk: Maria Carrington

Area
  - Total: 9.27 sq mi (24.02 km^{2})
  - Land: 8.66 sq mi (22.44 km^{2})
  - Water: 0.61 sq mi (1.58 km^{2}) 6.59%
  - Rank: 216th of 565 in state 21st of 40 in county
- Elevation: 59 ft (18 m)

Population (2020)
  - Total: 11,791
  - Estimate (2023): 12,038
  - Rank: 214th of 565 in state 13th of 40 in county
  - Density: 1,361.1/sq mi (525.5/km^{2})
  - Rank: 350th of 565 in state 21st of 40 in county
- Time zone: UTC−05:00 (Eastern (EST))
  - Summer (DST): UTC−04:00 (Eastern (EDT))
- ZIP Code: 08505
- Area code: 609
- FIPS code: 3400506700
- GNIS feature ID: 0882110
- Website: www.bordentowntownship.com

Bordentown Township is a township in Burlington County, in the U.S. state of New Jersey. As of the 2020 United States census, the township's population was 11,791, an increase of 424 (+3.7%) from the 2010 census count of 11,367, which in turn reflected an increase of 2,987 (+35.6%) from the 8,380 counted in the 2000 census. The township, and all of Burlington County, is a part of the Philadelphia metropolitan area.

Bordentown was incorporated as a township by an act of the New Jersey Legislature on March 8, 1852, from portions of Chesterfield Township and Mansfield Township, based on the results of a referendum held that same day. Bordentown city separated from the township in 1877 and Fieldsboro became fully independent in 1894 The township was named for founder Joseph Borden.

== Geography ==
According to the United States Census Bureau, the township had a total area of 9.28 square miles (24.02 km^{2}), including 8.66 square miles (22.44 km^{2}) of land and 0.61 square miles (1.58 km^{2}) of water (6.59%).

The township borders Bordentown City, Chesterfield Township, Fieldsboro, Florence Township and Mansfield Township in Burlington County; Hamilton Township in Mercer County; and Falls Township across the Delaware River in Pennsylvania.

Crosswicks Creek and its juncture with the Delaware River, otherwise known as the Trenton-Hamilton Marsh, is a significant ecosystem and, with the peninsula of land and waterways to the northwest of Bordentown Township known, respectively, as Duck Island, Duck Creek and the Delaware and Raritan Canal, it is protected by the State of New Jersey as the Duck Island Recreation Area.

Unincorporated communities, localities and place names located partially or completely within the township include Bossert Estates, Dunns Mill and Newbold Island.

The former 40-acre (16 ha) Parklands dump brownfield site is being transformed to a solar array by PSE&G as part of a project that began in 2014.

== Demographics ==
Historical population
Census	Pop.	Note	%±
1860	4,027		—
1870	6,041	*	50.0%
1880	1,076		−82.2%
1890	858		−20.3%
1900	488	*	−43.1%
1910	608		24.6%
1920	596		−2.0%
1930	818		37.2%
1940	1,095		33.9%
1950	2,033		85.7%
1960	5,936		192.0%
1970	7,303		23.0%
1980	7,170		−1.8%
1990	7,683		7.2%
2000	8,380		9.1%
2010	11,367		35.6%
2020	11,791		3.7%
2023 (est.)	12,038		2.1%
Population sources: 1860–2000 1860–1920; 1860–1870 1870 1880–1890; 1890–1910 1910–1930; 1940–2000 2000; 2010 2020 * = Lost territory in previous decade.

=== 2010 census ===
The 2010 United States census counted 11,367 people, 4,173 households, and 3,096 families in the township. The population density was 1,335.0 per square mile (515.4/km^{2}). There were 4,360 housing units at an average density of 512.1 per square mile (197.7/km^{2}). The racial makeup was 74.38% (8,455) White, 10.70% (1,216) Black or African American, 0.26% (30) Native American, 10.57% (1,201) Asian, 0.06% (7) Pacific Islander, 1.58% (180) from other races, and 2.45% (278) from two or more races. Hispanic or Latino of any race were 6.02% (684) of the population.

Of the 4,173 households, 36.6% had children under the age of 18; 58.1% were married couples living together; 12.2% had a female householder with no husband present and 25.8% were non-families. Of all households, 20.9% were made up of individuals and 6.1% had someone living alone who was 65 years of age or older. The average household size was 2.67 and the average family size was 3.13.

26.0% of the population were under the age of 18, 7.2% from 18 to 24, 28.1% from 25 to 44, 28.0% from 45 to 64, and 10.6% who were 65 years of age or older. The median age was 38.1 years. For every 100 females, the population had 94.9 males. For every 100 females ages 18 and older there were 89.9 males.

The Census Bureau's 2006–2010 American Community Survey showed that (in 2010 inflation-adjusted dollars) median household income was $80,860 (with a margin of error of +/− $4,727) and the median family income was $97,346 (+/− $8,031). Males had a median income of $60,690 (+/− $3,155) versus $52,076 (+/− $4,827) for females. The per capita income for the borough was $35,276 (+/− $1,638). About 1.7% of families and 1.8% of the population were below the poverty line, including 3.2% of those under age 18 and 1.7% of those age 65 or over.

=== 2000 census ===
As of the 2000 United States census there were 8,380 people, 3,293 households, and 2,305 families residing in the township. The population density was 984.9 inhabitants per square mile (380.3/km^{2}). There were 3,436 housing units at an average density of 403.8 per square mile (155.9/km^{2}). The racial makeup of the township was 89.33% White, 5.02% African American, 0.20% Native American, 3.32% Asian, 0.68% from other races, and 1.44% from two or more races. Hispanic or Latino of any race were 3.03% of the population.

There were 3,293 households, out of which 32.6% had children under the age of 18 living with them, 56.5% were married couples living together, 9.8% had a female householder with no husband present, and 30.0% were non-families. 23.5% of all households were made up of individuals, and 7.4% had someone living alone who was 65 years of age or older. The average household size was 2.53 and the average family size was 3.03.

In the township the population was spread out, with 23.7% under the age of 18, 6.3% from 18 to 24, 34.6% from 25 to 44, 23.8% from 45 to 64, and 11.7% who were 65 years of age or older. The median age was 38 years. For every 100 females, there were 94.9 males. For every 100 females age 18 and over, there were 90.9 males.

The median income for a household in the township was $60,131, and the median income for a family was $71,627. Males had a median income of $45,604 versus $35,115 for females. The per capita income for the township was $26,934. About 2.0% of families and 2.8% of the population were below the poverty line, including 2.2% of those under age 18 and 5.3% of those age 65 or over.

The most common ancestries in Bordentown Township were Italian (25.7%), Irish (23.8%), German (20.0%), English (11.8%) and Polish (9.8%).

== Government ==
=== Local government ===
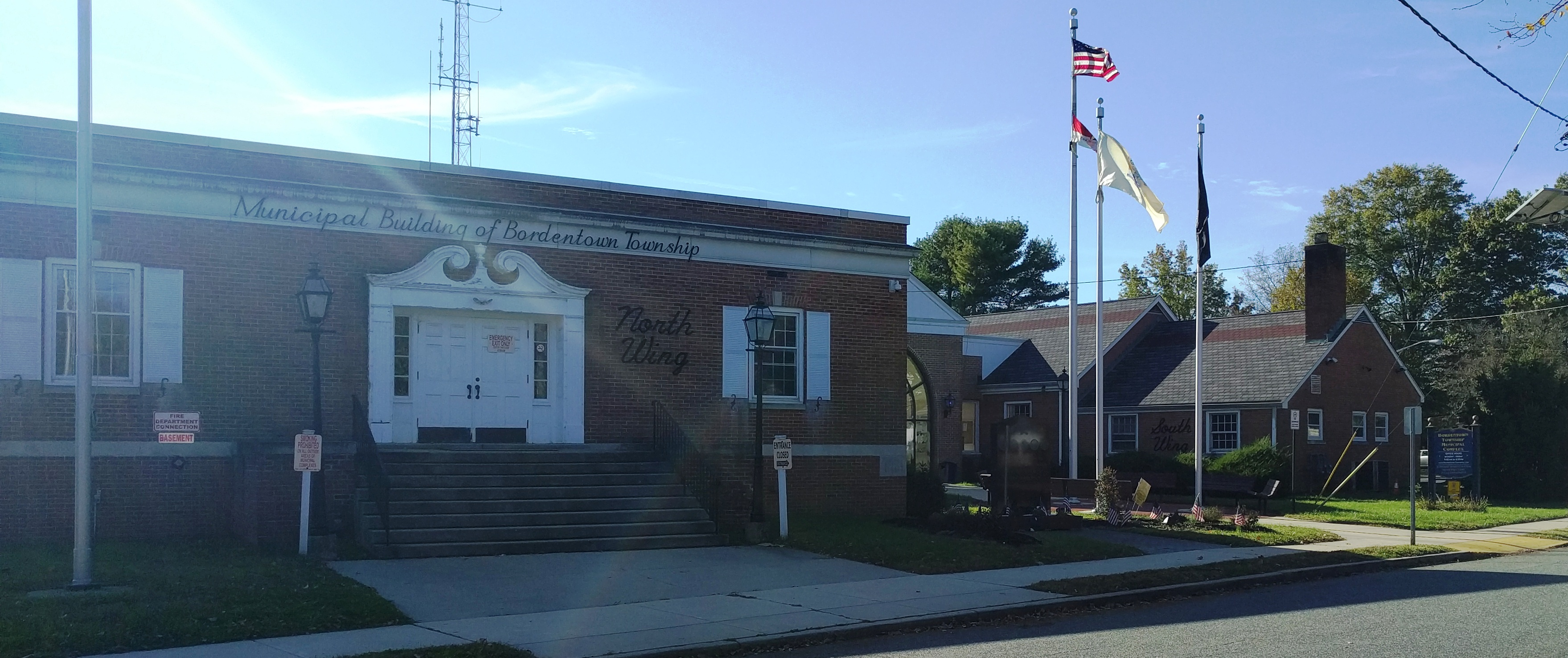
Municipal Building of Bordentown Township

Bordentown Township is governed under the Township form of New Jersey municipal government, one of 141 municipalities (of the 564) statewide that use this form, the second-most commonly used form of government in the state. The Township Committee is comprised of five members, who are elected directly by the voters at-large in partisan elections to serve three-year terms of office on a staggered basis, with either one or two seats coming up for election each year as part of the November general election in a three-year cycle. At an annual reorganization meeting, the Township Committee selects one of its members to serve as Mayor and another as Deputy Mayor.

As of 2024, members of the Bordentown Township Committee are Mayor Eugene M. Fuzy (D, term on committee ends December 31, 2025; term as mayor ends 2024), Deputy Mayor Aneka A. Miller (D, 2026), Bill Grayson (D, 20226), Eric Holliday (D, 2024), and Kelly Lozito (D, 2024).

In January 2023, Bill Grayson was appointed to fill the seat expiring in December 2023 that had been held by James H. Kostoplis until he resigned the previous month after being elected as Sheriff of Burlington County.

John Moynihan was selected in July 2012 from a list of three candidates nominated by the Republican municipal committee to fill the seat vacated by Anita DiMattia after she left office the previous month.

=== Federal, state and county representation ===
Bordentown Township is located in the 3rd Congressional District and is part of New Jersey's 7th state legislative district. Prior to the 2011 reapportionment following the 2010 census, Bordentown Township had been in the 30th state legislative district. Prior to the 2010 Census, Bordentown Township had been part of the 4th Congressional District, a change made by the New Jersey Redistricting Commission that took effect in January 2013, based on the results of the November 2012 general elections.

For the 119th United States Congress, New Jersey's 3rd congressional district is currently represented Herb Conaway (D, Delran Township). New Jersey is represented in the United States Senate by Democrats Cory Booker (Newark, term ends 2027) and Andy Kim (Moorestown, term ends 2031).

For the 2026–2027 session, the 7th legislative district of the New Jersey Legislature is represented in the State Senate by Troy Singleton (D, Palmyra) and in the General Assembly by Carol A. Murphy (D, Mount Laurel) and Balvir Singh (D, Burlington Township).

Burlington County is governed by a Board of County Commissioners comprised of five members who are chosen at-large in partisan elections to serve three-year terms of office on a staggered basis, with either one or two seats coming up for election each year; at an annual reorganization meeting, the board selects a director and deputy director from among its members to serve a one-year term. As of 2026, Burlington County's Commissioners are: Director Felicia Hopson (D, Willingboro Township, term as commissioner ends December 31, 2027; term as director ends 2026), Deputy Director Allison Eckel (D, Medford, term as commissioner ends 2028; term as deputy director ends 2026), Randy Brolo (D, Lumberton, 2026; elected to an unexpired term), Tyler Burrell (D, Delran Township, 2027) and Tom Pullion (D, Edgewater Park, 2026).

Burlington County's constitutional officers are Clerk Joanne Schwartz (D, Southampton Township, 2028), Sheriff James H. Kostoplis (D, Bordentown, 2028) and Surrogate Brian J. Carlin (D, Burlington Township, 2026).

=== Politics ===
United States presidential election results for Bordentown Township 2024 2020 2016 2012 2008 2004
Year	Republican		Democratic		Third party(ies)	
Year	No.	%	No.	%	No.	%
2024	2,607	43.68%	3,264	54.69%	97	1.63%
2020	2,900	42.08%	3,888	56.42%	103	1.49%
2016	2,493	44.34%	2,929	52.10%	200	3.56%
2012	2,034	40.22%	2,949	58.32%	74	1.46%
2008	2,232	43.71%	2,812	55.07%	62	1.21%
2004	2,305	49.48%	2,320	49.81%	33	0.71%

As of March 2011, there were a total of 6,378 registered voters in Bordentown Township, of which 1,793 (28.1% vs. 33.3% countywide) were registered as Democrats, 1,263 (19.8% vs. 23.9%) were registered as Republicans and 3,321 (52.1% vs. 42.8%) were registered as Unaffiliated. There was one voter registered to another party. Among the township's 2010 Census population, 56.1% (vs. 61.7% in Burlington County) were registered to vote, including 75.8% of those ages 18 and over (vs. 80.3% countywide).

Gubernatorial election results for Bordentown Township
Year	Republican		Democratic		Third party(ies)	
Year	No.	%	No.	%	No.	%
2025	1,992	38.93%	3,098	60.54%	27	0.53%
2021	1,986	47.12%	2,198	52.15%	31	0.74%
2017	1,402	43.27%	1,781	54.97%	57	1.76%
2013	2,029	61.94%	1,194	36.45%	53	1.62%
2009	1,733	49.63%	1,464	41.92%	295	8.45%
2005	1,590	51.22%	1,391	44.81%	123	3.96%

In the 2012 presidential election, Democrat Barack Obama received 2,949 votes (57.8% vs. 58.1% countywide), ahead of Republican Mitt Romney with 2,034 votes (39.9% vs. 40.2%) and other candidates with 74 votes (1.5% vs. 1.0%), among the 5,102 ballots cast by the township's 6,794 registered voters, for a turnout of 75.1% (vs. 74.5% in Burlington County). In the 2008 presidential election, Democrat Barack Obama received 2,812 votes (54.7% vs. 58.4% countywide), ahead of Republican John McCain with 2,232 votes (43.4% vs. 39.9%) and other candidates with 62 votes (1.2% vs. 1.0%), among the 5,144 ballots cast by the township's 6,374 registered voters, for a turnout of 80.7% (vs. 80.0% in Burlington County). In the 2004 presidential election, Democrat John Kerry received 2,320 votes (49.4% vs. 52.9% countywide), ahead of Republican George W. Bush with 2,305 votes (49.1% vs. 46.0%) and other candidates with 33 votes (0.7% vs. 0.8%), among the 4,694 ballots cast by the township's 5,903 registered voters, for a turnout of 79.5% (vs. 78.8% in the whole county).

In the 2013 gubernatorial election, Republican Chris Christie received 2,029 votes (60.9% vs. 61.4% countywide), ahead of Democrat Barbara Buono with 1,194 votes (35.9% vs. 35.8%) and other candidates with 53 votes (1.6% vs. 1.2%), among the 3,330 ballots cast by the township's 6,840 registered voters, yielding a 48.7% turnout (vs. 44.5% in the county). In the 2009 gubernatorial election, Republican Chris Christie received 1,733 votes (49.1% vs. 47.7% countywide), ahead of Democrat Jon Corzine with 1,464 votes (41.5% vs. 44.5%), Independent Chris Daggett with 182 votes (5.2% vs. 4.8%) and other candidates with 113 votes (3.2% vs. 1.2%), among the 3,530 ballots cast by the township's 6,435 registered voters, yielding a 54.9% turnout (vs. 44.9% in the county).

United States Senate election results for Bordentown Township1
Year	Republican		Democratic		Third party(ies)	
Year	No.	%	No.	%	No.	%
2024	2,237	38.80%	3,431	59.50%	98	1.70%
2018	2,124	45.14%	2,354	50.03%	227	4.82%
2012	1,972	40.77%	2,821	58.32%	44	0.91%
2006	1,382	49.13%	1,372	48.77%	59	2.10%

United States Senate election results for Bordentown Township2
Year	Republican		Democratic		Third party(ies)	
Year	No.	%	No.	%	No.	%
2020	2,817	42.01%	3,785	56.45%	103	1.54%
2014	1,222	44.32%	1,489	54.01%	46	1.67%
2013	817	47.44%	866	50.29%	39	2.26%
2008	2,194	47.04%	2,396	51.37%	74	1.59%

== Education ==
Public school students in pre-kindergarten through twelfth grade attend the schools of the Bordentown Regional School District, which serves students from Bordentown City, Bordentown Township and Fieldsboro Borough. As of the 2023–24 school year, the district, comprised of five schools, had an enrollment of 2,232 students and 190.0 classroom teachers (on an FTE basis), for a student–teacher ratio of 11.8:1. Schools in the district (with 2023–24 enrollment data from the National Center for Education Statistics) are Clara Barton Elementary School with 215 students in grades K–2 (generally serves Bordentown City and the Holloway Meadows section of Bordentown Township), Peter Muschal Elementary School with 480 students in grades PreK–5 (generally serves remainder of Bordentown Township and the Borough of Fieldsboro), MacFarland Intermediate School with 247 students in grades 3–5, Bordentown Regional Middle School with 505 students in grades 6–8 and Bordentown Regional High School with 762 students in grades 9–12. The district's board of education is comprised of nine members, who are elected directly by voters to serve three-year terms of office on a staggered basis, with three seats up for election each year. The board's nine seats are allocated based on the population of the constituent municipalities, with five seats assigned to Bordentown Township.

The New Hanover Township School District, consisting of New Hanover Township (including its Cookstown area) and Wrightstown Borough, sends students to Bordentown Regional High School on a tuition basis for ninth through twelfth grades as part of a sending/receiving relationship that has been in place since the 1960s, with about 50 students from the New Hanover district being sent to the high school. As of 2011, the New Hanover district was considering expansion of its relationship to send students to Bordentown for middle school for grades 6–8.

Students from Bordentown Township, and from all of Burlington County, are eligible to attend the Burlington County Institute of Technology, a countywide public school district that serves the vocational and technical education needs of students at the high school and post-secondary level at its campuses in Medford and Westampton Township.

== Transportation ==
=== Roads and highways ===
As of May 2010, the township had a total of 55.42 miles (89.19 km) of roadways, of which 37.34 miles (60.09 km) were maintained by the municipality, 5.05 miles (8.13 km) by Burlington County, 10.87 miles (17.49 km) by the New Jersey Department of Transportation and 2.16 miles (3.48 km) by the New Jersey Turnpike Authority.

Interstate 95 and Interstate 295 are the two limited-access highways traversing the township. I-95 follows the New Jersey Turnpike through Bordentown Township, stretching along a southwest to northeast alignment for 2.1 miles (3.4 km) from Mansfield Township in the south to Chesterfield Township on the township's eastern border. Interstate 295 follows a similar alignment to the northwest of I-95, extending from Mansfield Township on the southwest to Hamilton Township in the north.

U.S. Route 130 and U.S. Route 206 are the primary surface highways traversing the township. US 206 has an interchange with I-95 (NJ Turnpike Exit 7), while US 130 has an interchange with I-295 (Exit 57). The two U.S. Highways also share a brief concurrency within the township boundaries where they intersect.

=== Public transportation ===
NJ Transit offers light rail service at the Bordentown station at Park Street on the River Line between the Trenton Rail Station and the Walter Rand Transportation Center (and other stops) in Camden.

NJ Transit provides bus service in the township between Trenton and Philadelphia on the 409 route.

== Notable people ==
People who were born in, residents of, or otherwise closely associated with Bordentown Township include:

- Andy Kim (born 1982), politician and former U.S. representative from New Jersey's 3rd congressional district and diplomat serving as U.S. Senator.
- Julia Reichert (1946–2022), Academy Award-winning documentary filmmaker, activist, and feminist
