= Joseph Mailliard =

American ornithologist (1873-1945)

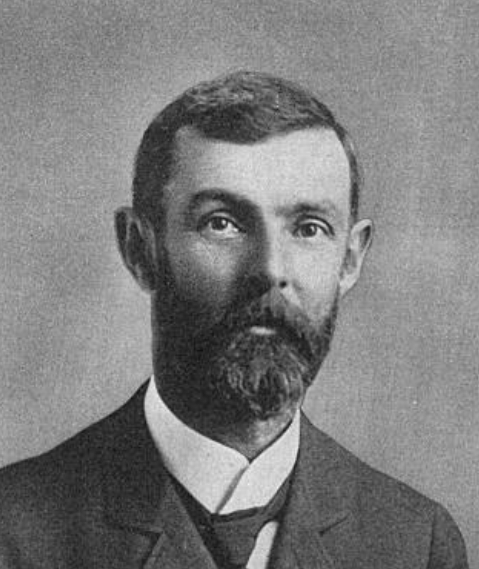
Mailliard in 1902

Joseph Mailliard (December 30, 1873 – December 12, 1945) was an American ornithologist who served as a curator of ornithology at the California Academy of Sciences.

Mailliard was born in Bordentown, New Jersey, where his father of French ancestry came from a family that had served the family of Joseph Bonaparte (brother of Napoleon). His mother Annie née Ward was the sister of Julia Ward Howe. The family moved to San Francisco in 1873 and they set up the Rancho San Geronimo in Marin County. Joseph and his brother John Ward Mailliard grew up in the outdoors and took an interest in natural history, learning to prepare bird skins and eggs from Charles Andrew Allen (1841-1930) who lived nearby. He joined the University of California and majored in mining and chemistry but missed graduating in 1879 due to pneumonia. He was recommended an ocean voyage for health and he visited Alaska in 1896, making large collections on the trip and also getting acquainted with Joseph Grinnell. This was followed by another expedition to Chile in 1902. He deposited the collections at the California Academy of Sciences but they were destroyed in the 1906 fire. In 1918 a fireproof building was constructed at the California Academy of Sciences and the Mailliard brothers donated their personal collections there. Joseph became an honorary curator from 1919 and began to study the materials and publish notes. He retired in 1927 but continued as an emeritus curator. Grinnell named a subspecies of the song sparrow Melospiza melodia mailliardi after him in 1911.
