= Clara Barton Schoolhouse =

Historical site in Bordentown, New Jersey, US

Coordinates: 40.1460°N 74.7054°W

The Clara Barton Schoolhouse is a historical site in Bordentown, New Jersey, where Clara Barton founded the first free public school in New Jersey.

== Background ==
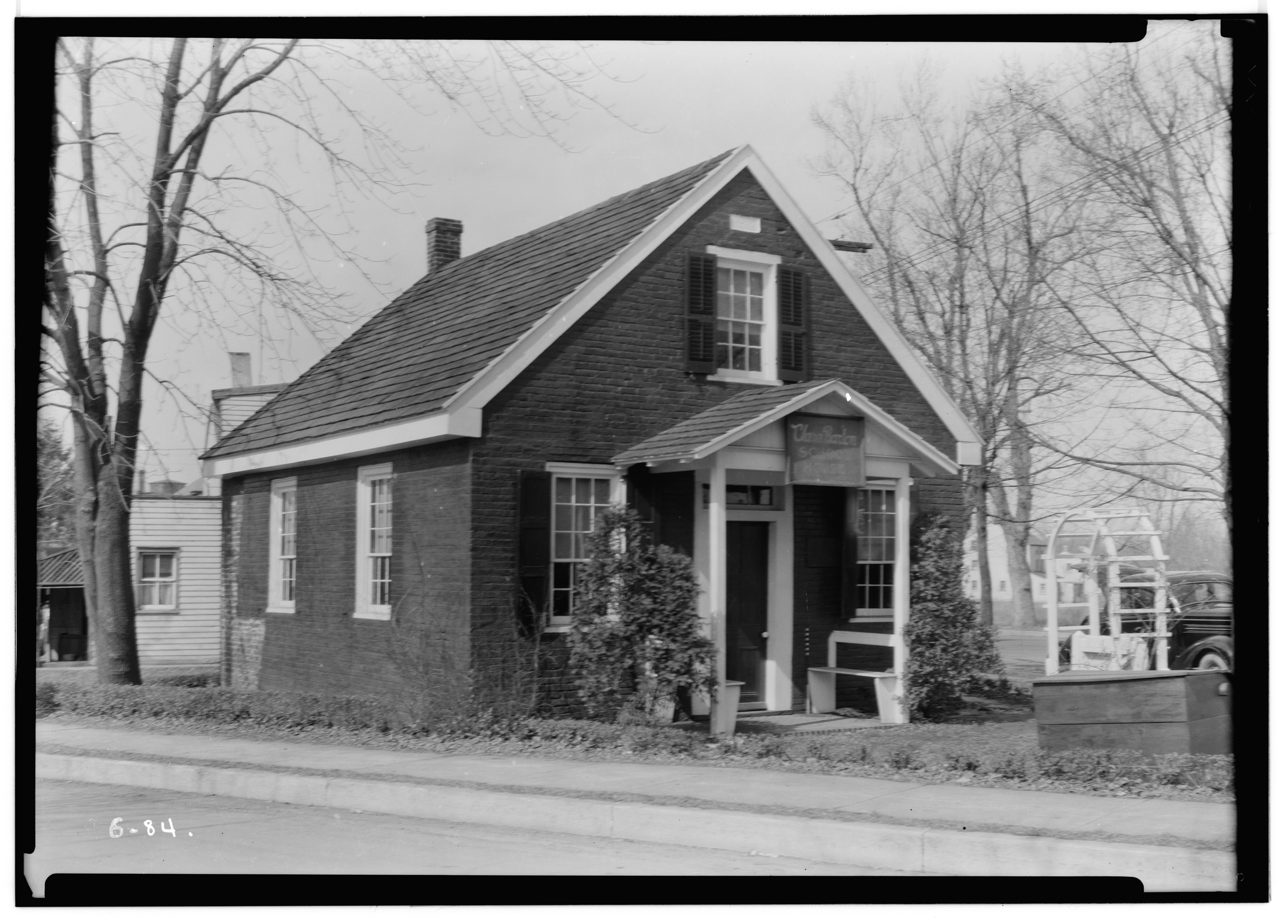
Historic American Buildings Survey Nathaniel R. Ewan, Photographer March 10, 1936 - Clara Barton School, 142 Crosswicks and Burlington Streets, Bordentown

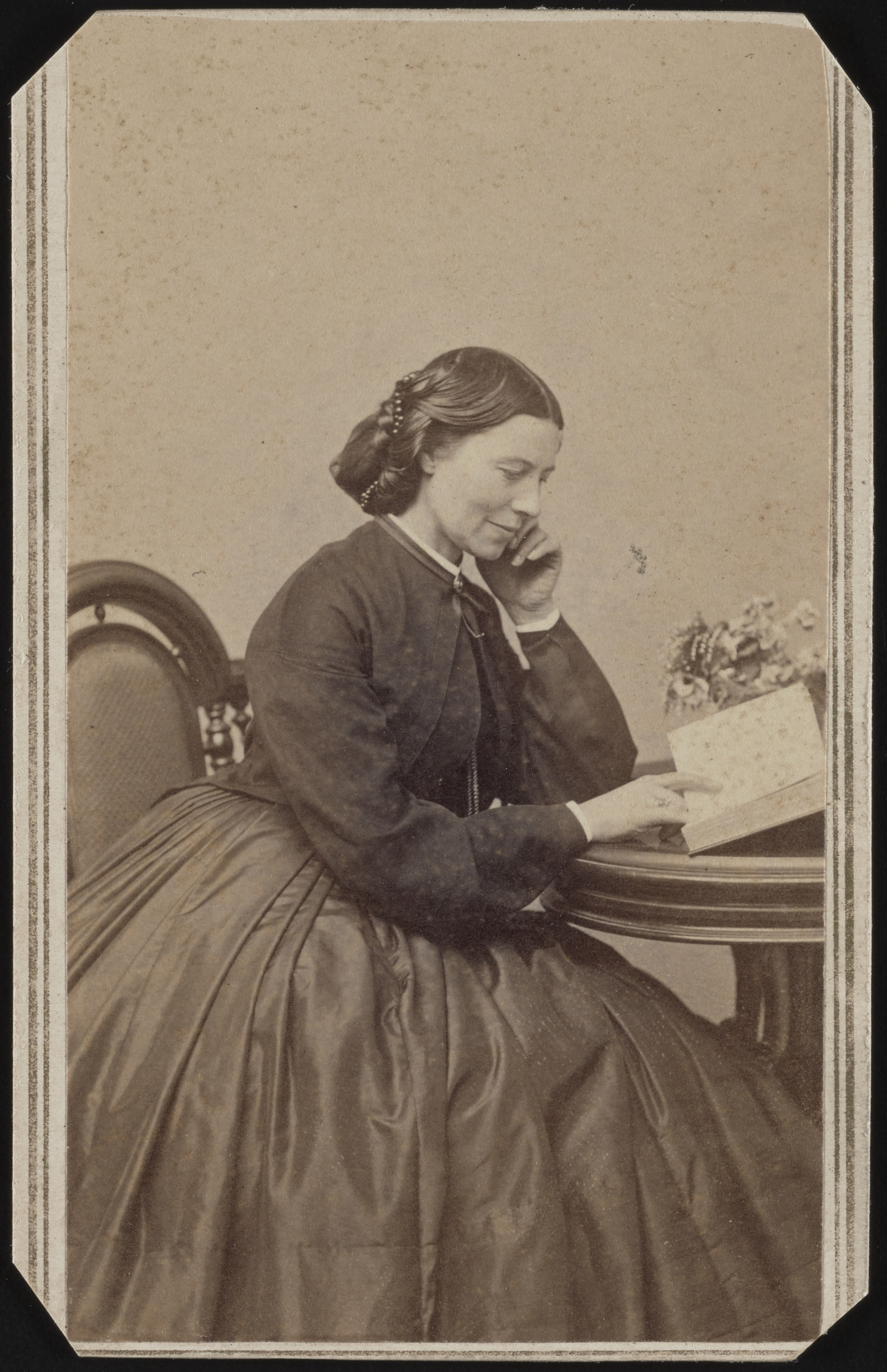
Clara Barton, Union nurse, photograph by Charles R.B. Claflin, circa March 1865

At age 16 she was examined by noted phrenologists, the Fowler brothers, who recommended she become a schoolteacher to alleviate her shyness. At age 17 she started her career, teaching for 12 years in the Oxford area of Massachusetts, where there was free public education. She spent a year doing study at the Clinton Liberal Institute in Clinton, New York. After a year teaching in Hightstown, New Jersey, and hearing about the "deplorable" level of education in neighboring Bordentown, she moved there with a friend in 1852 to teach. In 1852 she established the first free New Jersey public school in Bordentown. She started with six "notoriously bad boys of the town" in a one-room school, and within a year there were 600 students under her direction. To accommodate the extra students, a new and larger schoolhouse was built in 1853. When a man was hired as principal at twice her salary, she resigned. Barton later became famous for her humanitarian work with Civil War soldiers and founding the American Red Cross.

== Schoolhouse ==
The building predates its use by the school, as manifested by an 1839 stone. In 1852 the schoolhouse was noted to be dilapidated and after the new school was built it fell in disuse. In 1919 it was sold at a sheriff's auction for $300 to a couple that believed it should be preserved. In 1920 it was sold to the New Jersey State Board of Education for $1 on the condition that it would be “in trust for and [o]n behalf of the Schoolchildren of the State of New Jersey and to be forever preserved as a memorial of Clara Barton, deceased.” It was then turned over to the Bordentown Historical Society. In 1921 there was a restoration of the school, largely funded by school children and teacher donations. A letter had been sent to the students and teachers of New Jersey asking for “not more than a penny from each student and not more than a nickel from each teacher.” In 2021 another restoration was started, and will last through 2025. The goal of this restoration is to restore it to its 1921 appearance. There is not enough documentation of the 1852 structure to allow its appearance to recreate the original. It is in the Bordentown Historic District, admission is by appointment.
