= Sarah Stokes Walton =

American poet

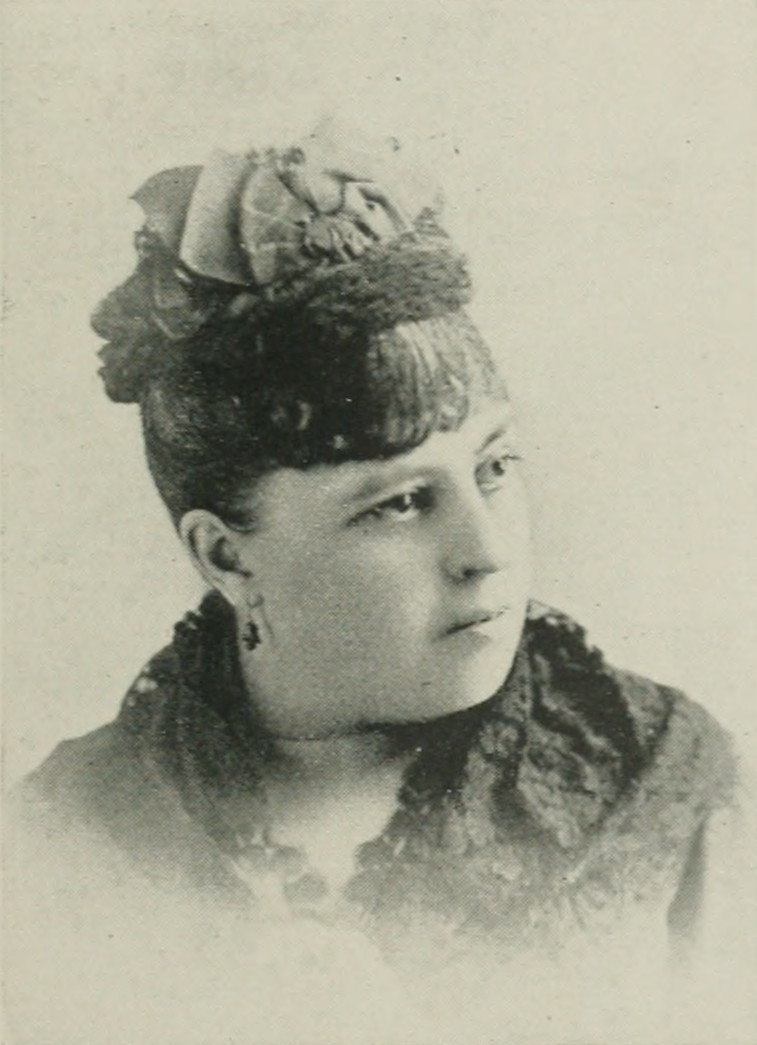
- Photo in A Woman of the Century
- Born: Sarah Stokes Dunn; February 12, 1844; Philadelphia, Pennsylvania, U.S.
- Died: May 13, 1899 (aged 55)
- Occupation: poet
- Spouse: Louis N. Walton (m. 1866)
- Children: 2

Sarah Stokes Walton (née, Dunn; February 12, 1844 – May 13, 1899) was an American poet. Her charitable deeds associated with St. Stephen's Episcopal Church, Beverly, New Jersey were highly valued. The church's first west window, representing charity, was dedicated to Walton.

== Early life and education ==
Sarah Stokes Dunn was born in Philadelphia, Pennsylvania, February 12, 1844. She was the third living child of Charles Crawford Dunn, Sr., and Helen Struthers, his wife. She was one of thirteen children.

Her ancestors on her father's side were Huguenot refugees, from the south of England. Her father's father, James Lorraine Dunn, a prominent lawyer of central Pennsylvania, was born in 1783, on the old homestead, located on the Chester River, Kent County, Maryland, where the family had lived for nearly 150 years prior to his birth. Mr. Dunn was the descendant in a direct line from Sir Michael Dunn, an Englishman, who came to the United States with the first Lord Calvert. On her mother's side, Walton was of Scotch descent. Her mother was the daughter of John Struthers, of Edinburgh, Scotland, who became one of Philadelphia's successful business men, and a grand-daughter of John Struthers, of Edinburgh, who presented to his adopted country the marble sarcophagus, in which rest the mortal remains of President George Washington.

From her sixth to her tenth year, Walton attended a private school kept by Miss Sarah James. In the spring of 1854, her father purchased a farm on the Delaware River, where he built their beautiful home, "Magnolia Hall". Her studies were continued in the Farnum preparatory school, Beverly, New Jersey. She was exceedingly fond of books, and remained in that school until 1858, when, at the age of fourteen years, her school days were brought to a close, as she was needed at home.

In 1864, about the close of the civil war, some business affairs of importance required her father's presence in Washington, D.C., for an indefinite time. He sold "Magnolia Hall" and the family moved to Philadelphia.

== Career ==
On October 24, 1866, she married Louis N. Walton, a Philadelphian by birth, but at that time doing business in Lexington, Kentucky, to which place the newly-wedded couple went. From that union, there were two living children, a daughter and a son.

Her husband's business affairs called him to Philadelphia in the course of three years, and there the family remained a short time. From that city, she moved to Beverly, New Jersey, where they settled permanently. There in her home, "Woodbine Villa," surrounded by her family and pets, she lived a quiet, uneventful life. Mr. Walton, a freight agent of the Pennsylvania Railroad, was in charge of the largest freight agency in the world as to territorial extent, amount of charges collected, and variety of commercial interests.

From her youth, Walton was a member of the Protestant Episcopal Church, and she was prominent in everything that advanced the interests of the church and its members. She was a member of St. Stephen's Ladies' Aid Society, of The King's Daughters, and of the New Jersey Society of the Colonial Dames of America.

Walton composed at night only, wrote only "when the spirit moves her," and took pencil and tablet to bed with her when in a writing mood.

== Personal life ==
She was also quite successful as an amateur artist, having taken a number of prizes for amateur work.

Walton died on May 13, 1899.
