= Burlington South =

Burlington South may refer to:

- Burlington South (provincial electoral district), in Ontario, Canada
- Burlington South station, a station on NJ Transit's River Line light rail system in New Jersey, United States
