= Beverly station =

Beverly Station may refer to:

- Vermont/Beverly station in Los Angeles, California
- Beverly Depot in Massachusetts
- Beverly/Edgewater Park station in New Jersey
