= Eleanor Bisbee =

American writer

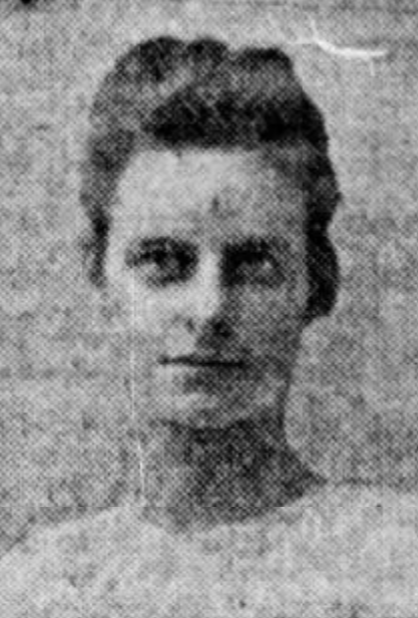
- Eleanor Bisbee, from a 1914 newspaper
- Born: July 22, 1893; Beverly, New Jersey, U.S.
- Died: April 18, 1956 (aged 62); San Francisco, California, U.S.
- Occupations: Writer, editor, Universalist minister, philosopher, college professor
- Notable work: The New Turks: Pioneers of the Republic, 1920-1950 (1951)

Eleanor Bisbee (July 22, 1893 – April 18, 1956) was an American journalist, Universalist minister, philosopher, and college professor, best known for her works on Turkish history, politics, and culture.

== Early life and education ==
Bisbee was born in Beverly, New Jersey (one source says she was born in Ocean City, New Jersey), the daughter of Frederick A. Bisbee and Martha Gally Bisbee. Her father was a Universalist minister and editor of The Universalist Leader. She graduated from Jackson College for Women (part of Tufts University) in 1915, and a Bachelor of Sacred Theology degree in 1917; she and her brother John were the only Theology School graduates at Tufts that year. She earned a Ph.D. in philosophy at the University of Cincinnati, with a dissertation titled "Instrumentalism in Plato's philosophy: A functional theory of ideas and of God" (1929).

In college Bisbee was president of the Christian Guild, a tennis champion and a member of the Alpha Omicron Pi sorority.

== Career ==
Between college and graduate school, Bisbee was a Universalist minister working in Minnesota and Ohio, and a journalist and newspaper editor in Miami, Florida. After completing her doctoral studies, she was a professor of philosophy and civilization at the University of Cincinnati from 1930 to 1931, and a professor of philosophy at Robert College in Istanbul from 1936 until 1942.

On her return to the United States, Bisbee concentrated on writing about Turkey, especially her book The New Turks: Pioneers of the Republic, 1920-1950 (1951). Her book was described as a "lively and sympathetic book to explain the Turkish people and to describe their recent achievements."

Bisbee was a columnist at the San Jose Mercury in her later years, and worked at the Hoover Institution Library, organizing the Turkish section. She spoke about the Middle East before community and campus audiences.

== Publications ==
- "The A B C and X Y Z of Tennis" (1921)
- "The Parmenides in the Light of the Propositional Function" (1933)
- "Confusion about exclusive and exceptive propositions" (1937)
- "Objectivity in the social sciences" (1937)
- The People of Turkey (1946)
- "Test of Democracy in Turkey" (1950)
- The New Turks: Pioneers of the Republic, 1920-1950 (1951, republished 2016)

== Personal life ==
Bisbee died in 1956, in San Francisco, at the age of 62. There is a collection of her papers in the Hoover Institution Library and Archives.
