= James F. Scott =

American physicist (1942–2020)

James F. Scott FRS
- Born: May 4, 1942; Beverly, New Jersey, U.S.
- Died: April 6, 2020 (aged 77); Cambridge, England
- Citizenship: United States
- Education: Ohio State University (PhD 1966)
- Known for: FRAM
- Awards: Jožef Stefan gold medal (2009); MRS gold medal (2008)
- Scientific career
- Fields: Ferroics
- Institutions: University of St Andrews (2015–); University of Cambridge (1999–); UNSW (1992–1999); RMIT (1992–1995); University of Colorado (1972–1992); Bell Laboratories (1966–1971)

James Floyd Scott FRS (4 May 1942 – 6 April 2020) was an American physicist and research director at the Cavendish Laboratory, University of Cambridge. He is considered one of the pioneers of ferroelectric memory devices. He was elected to the Royal Society in 2008.

== Biography ==
James Scott was born in Beverly, New Jersey. He attended high school in New Jersey and graduated from Harvard University in 1963. After receiving his doctorate in physics from Ohio State University (1966) in the field of high resolution molecular spectroscopy, he worked for six years in the Quantum Electronics Research Laboratory at Bell Laboratories, New Jersey. In 1972 he was appointed professor of physics at the University of Colorado, Boulder, where he established a research program investigating ferroelectrics using laser spectroscopy. It was here that began his groundbreaking work on "integrated ferroelectrics" — semiconductor chips that incorporate thin ferroelectric memory devices. In 1984 he co-founded Symetrix Corporation to develop ferroelectric RAM (FRAM), which licensed its technology to Matsushita. There followed appointments as Dean at the Royal Melbourne Institute of Technology (1992) and the University of New South Wales (1995). In 1997, he worked as a visiting professor in Yokohama thanks to an award from Sony and in Germany after receiving a Humboldt Research Award. In 1999, when he left Symetrix, he became professor of ferroics at the University of Cambridge where his research focused on multiferoed magnetoelectrics and nanometric methods. From 2015 he was a joint professor in both chemistry and physics at the University of St Andrews.

James Scott died on 6 April 2020, leaving a wife and three children.

== Awards ==
He was awarded the Materials Research Society gold medal in 2008 and Slovenia's Jožef Stefan gold medal in 2009. He was a member of the American Physical Society from 1974, a Fellow of the Royal Society from 2008, and a member of the Slovenian Academy of Sciences and Arts since 2011. In 2014 he was listed by Thomson Reuters as among the most highly cited physicists. In 2016 he was awarded the UNESCO medal for contributions to nanoscience and nanotechnology.

== Publications ==
- Scott, J. F. (2000). Ferroelectric memories. Berlin New York: Springer. ISBN 3-540-66387-8. OCLC 42771666.
