= Delanco station =

Light rail station in New Jersey, USA

Delanco
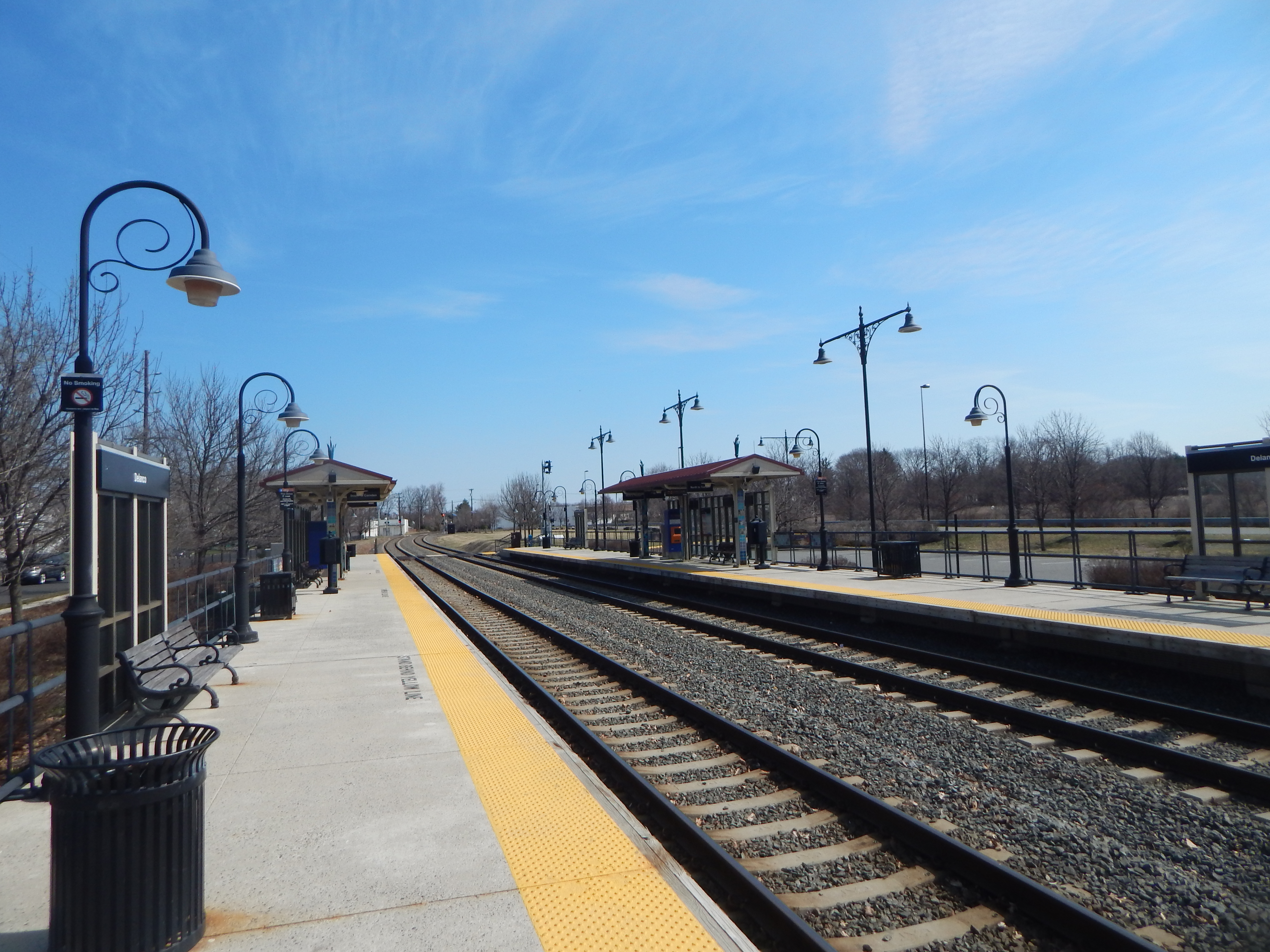
- Delanco station in April 2015.

General information
- Location: Rhawn Avenue; Delanco, New Jersey
- Coordinates: 40°2′53″N 74°57′1″W
- Owner: New Jersey Transit
- Platforms: 2 side platforms
- Tracks: 2

Construction
- Parking: 48 spaces plus 2 accessible spaces
- Accessible: yes

Other information
- Fare zone: 1

History
- Opened: March 15, 2004

Services
Preceding station	NJ Transit	Following station
Riverside toward Entertainment Center	River Line	Beverly/Edgewater Park toward Trenton

Former services
Preceding station	Pennsylvania Railroad	Following station
Riverside toward Camden	Amboy Branch	Perkins toward South Amboy
Location

Delanco is a station on the River Line light rail system, located on Rhawn Avenue in Delanco, New Jersey.

The Pennsylvania Railroad's Delanco station lay approximately 850 feet (260 m) to the west of the current station site, on Pennsylvania Avenue between Union and Walnut. Service between Trenton and Camden ended on June 28, 1963.

The station opened on March 15, 2004. Southbound service from the station is available to Camden, New Jersey. Northbound service is available to the Trenton Rail Station with connections to New Jersey Transit trains to New York City, SEPTA trains to Philadelphia, Pennsylvania, and Amtrak trains. Transfer to the PATCO Speedline is available at the Walter Rand Transportation Center.

No connecting service is available at this station. The station itself is the first one after the crossing of the Rancocas Creek Railroad Bridge. The surroundings of the station are primarily residential, with the exceptions of an open field across Rhawn Avenue, and a former one-story industrial building at the end of the road, that is fenced off. A Boise Cascade warehouse can be found across from the east end of Rhawn Avenue on Coopertown Road.

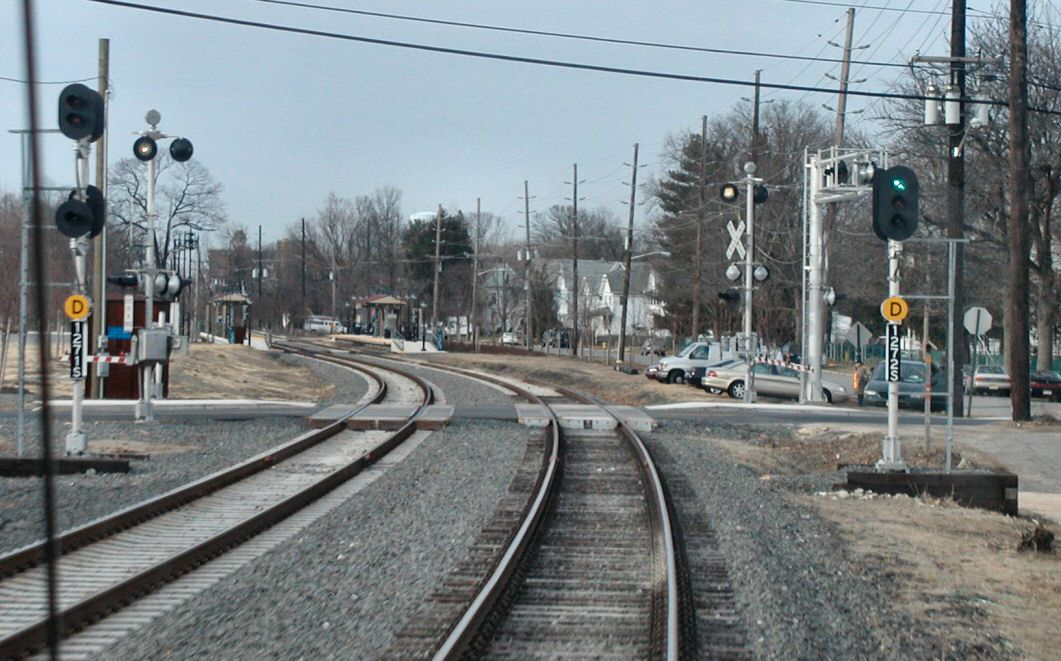
Looking south at the station from the Coopertown Road/Cooper Street grade crossing.
