= Philadelphia Watch Case Company Building =

- U.S. National Register of Historic Places
- New Jersey Register of Historic Places
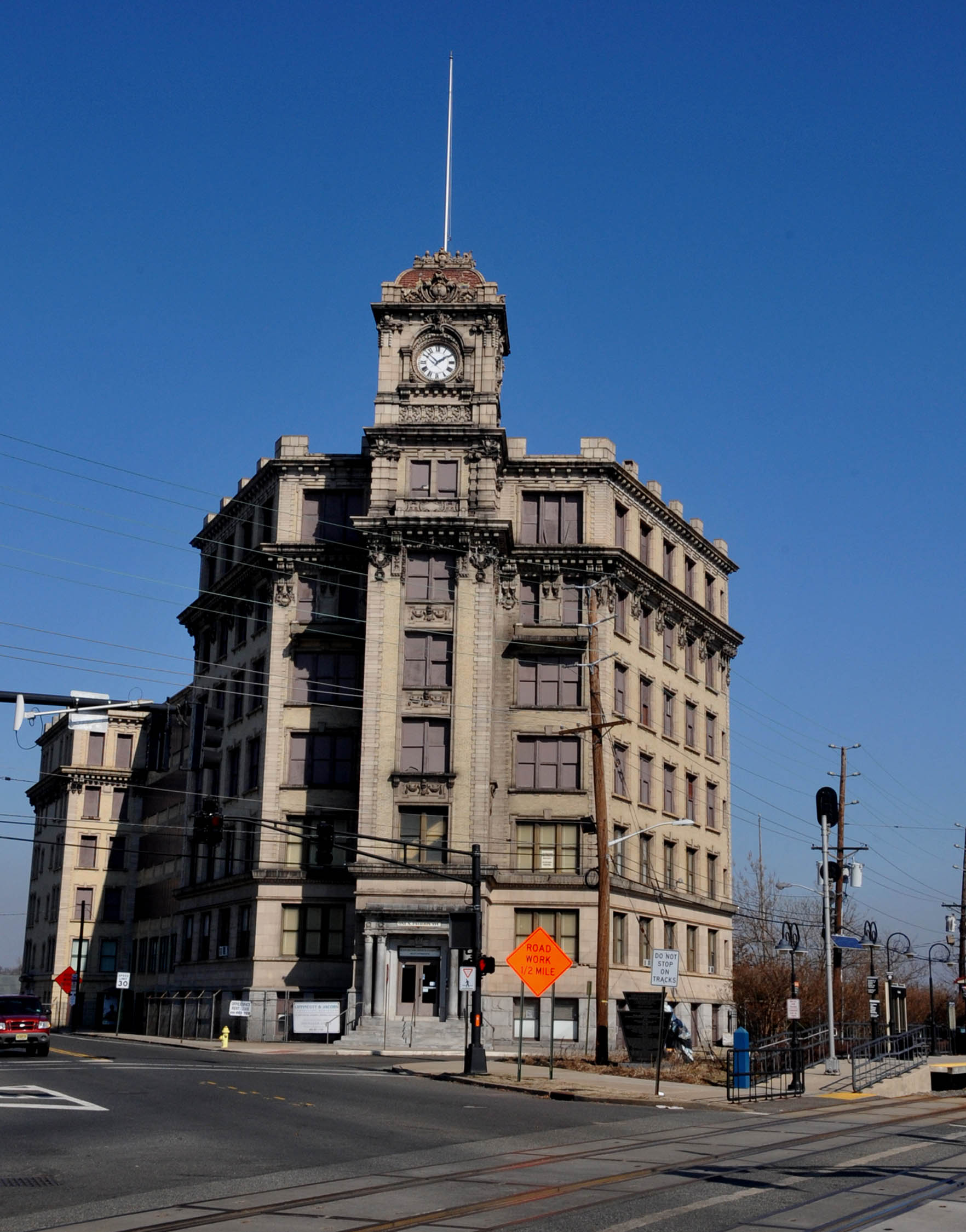

- Location within Burlington County, New Jersey Location within New Jersey Location within the United States
- Location: Pavilion and Lafayette Avenues, Riverside Township, New Jersey
- Coordinates: 40°02′24″N 74°57′34″W
- Area: 2.5 acres (1.0 ha)
- Built: 1852
- NRHP reference No.: 78001747
- NJRHP No.: 865

Significant dates
- Added to NRHP: January 31, 1978
- Designated NJRHP: April 15, 1977

The Philadelphia Watch Case Company Building is located at Pavilion and Lafayette Avenues near the Riverside station in Riverside Township of Burlington County, New Jersey. It was added to the National Register of Historic Places on January 31, 1978, for its significance in architecture, industry, and entertainment.

== History ==
In 1852, Samuel Bechtold began constructing the oldest part of the building, the Pavilion Hotel. In 1892, Theophilus Zurbrugg, owner of the Philadelphia Watch Case Company, purchased it. In 1906, the company started construction of the larger building, completed in 1908.

The company folded in the mid-1950s and the building was fully vacant by 1977. An engineering firm and the Riverside Historical Society had offices on the first floor later in the century but the building was again fully vacant by 2017.

In 2016, the building was purchased by Raphael Weiss for redevelopment. During construction, he falsified construction permits, pleading guilty in 2022. As of 2024, Sheharyar Shaikh had purchased the building and was proceeding with implementing redevelopment plans for conversion into a residential building approved by the township in 2021.

== See also ==
- National Register of Historic Places listings in Burlington County, New Jersey
