= Burlington South station =

Train station in Burlington, New Jersey

Burlington South
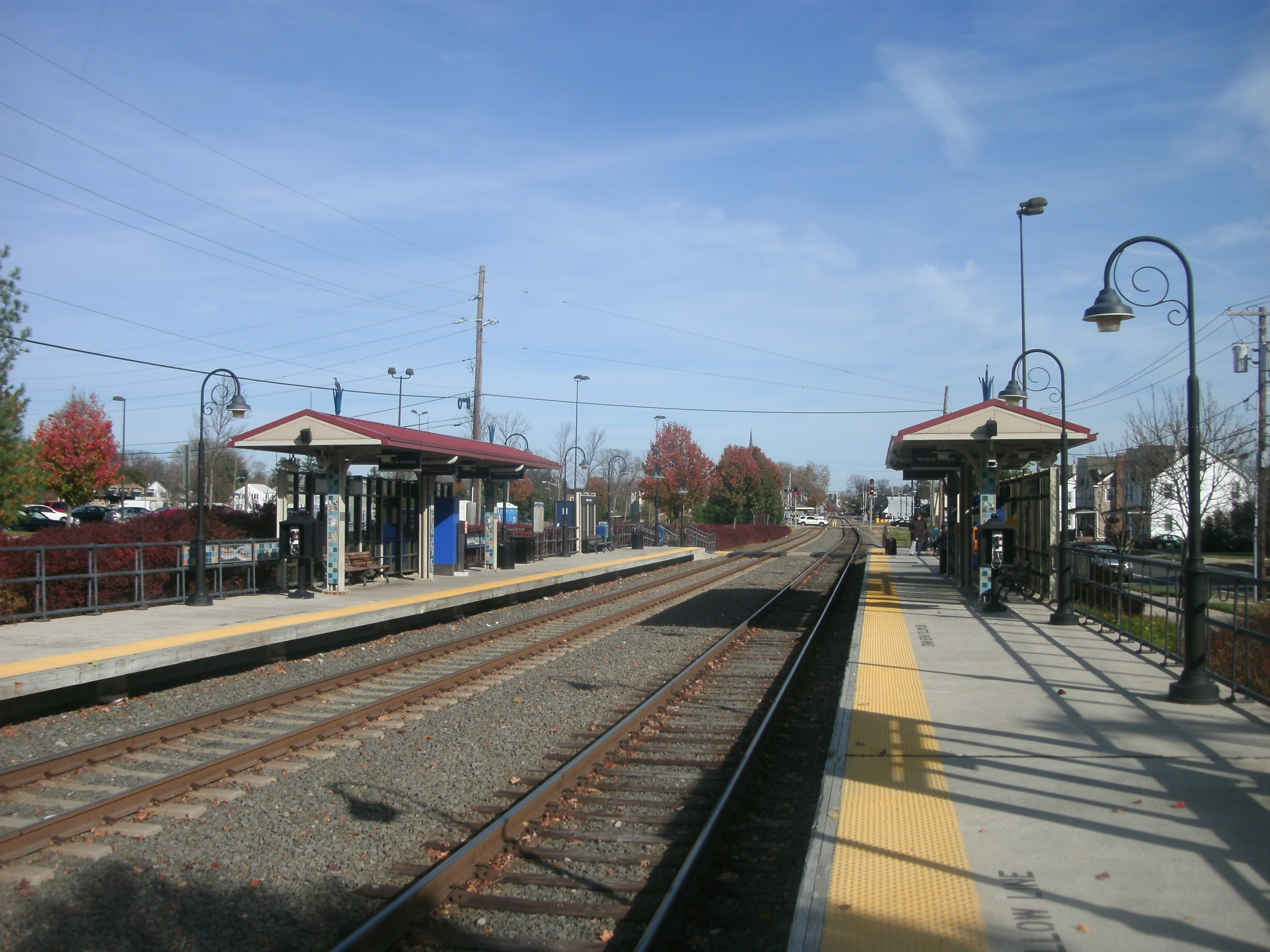
- Station as seen from the southern end of the platform

General information
- Location: West Broad Street; Burlington, New Jersey
- Coordinates: 40°4′28″N 74°52′8″W
- Owner: NJ Transit
- Platforms: 2 side platforms
- Tracks: 2

Construction
- Parking: 356 spaces plus 12 accessible spaces
- Cycle facilities: Bike racks
- Accessible: Yes

Other information
- Fare zone: 1

History
- Opened: March 15, 2004

Services
Preceding station	NJ Transit	Following station
Beverly/Edgewater Park toward Entertainment Center	River Line	Burlington Towne Centre toward Trenton
Location

Burlington South is a station on NJ Transit's River Line light rail system, located on West Broad Street in Burlington, Burlington County, New Jersey, United States, near the New Jersey side of the Burlington–Bristol Bridge.

The station opened on March 15, 2004. Southbound service from the station is available to Camden, New Jersey. Northbound service is available to the Trenton Transit Center with connections to NJ Transit trains to New York City, SEPTA trains to Philadelphia, and Amtrak trains. Transfer to the PATCO Speedline is available at the Walter Rand Transportation Center.

Park and ride service is available at this station, which is near the southeastern plaza of the Burlington–Bristol Bridge. The station contains a pair of non-functioning railroad signals and a sign on the evolution of grade crossing signs in front of a bicycle rack. A similar display can be found at Riverton further to the southwest.
