= St. Stephen's Episcopal Church (Beverly, New Jersey) =

Historic church in New Jersey, United States

- U.S. National Register of Historic Places
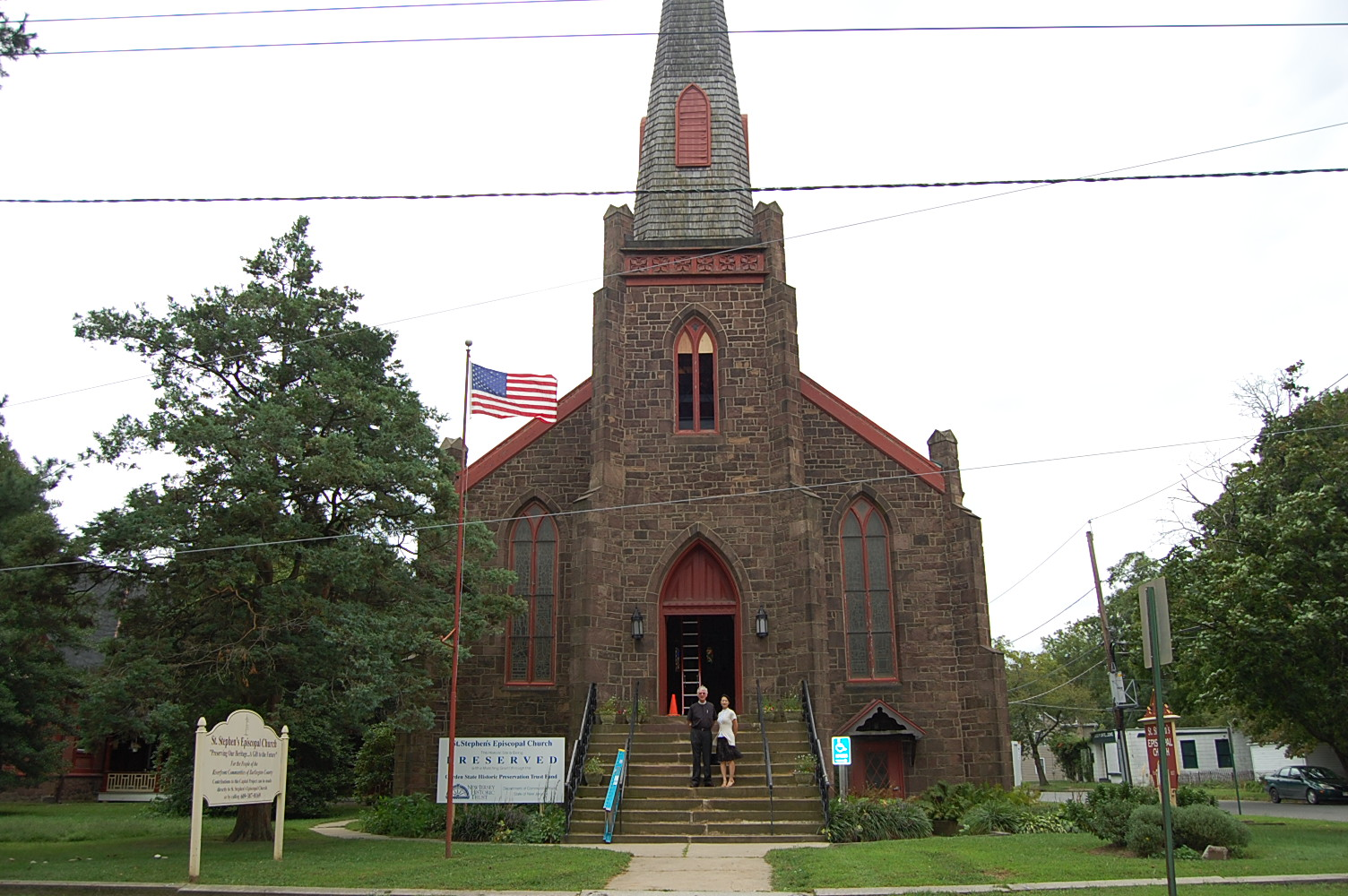

- Location within Burlington County, New Jersey Location within New Jersey Location within the United States
- Location: 158 Warren Street, Beverly, New Jersey
- Coordinates: 40°3′47″N 74°55′13″W
- Area: 2.3 acres (0.93 ha)
- Built: 1853-1855
- Architect: Thomas Harris; Frazer, Furness and Hewitt
- Architectural style: Gothic Revival
- NRHP reference No.: 99001363
- Added to NRHP: November 25, 1999

St. Stephen's Episcopal Church, in Beverly, Burlington County, New Jersey, United States, is located on the corner of Warren and Wilmerton streets in Beverly. While the St. Stephen's community worshipped at the site beginning in 1837, the current church building was consecrated in 1855 and the rector presently serving the congregation is Fr. Robert Legnani.

The church reported 174 members in 2016 and 145 members in 2023; no membership statistics were reported nationally in 2024 parochial reports. Plate and pledge income reported for the congregation in 2024 was $76,465. Average Sunday attendance (ASA) in 2024 was 22 persons, down from a reported 60 in 2015.

== Founding and erection ==
The congregation of St. Stephen's Episcopal Church formed in 1837 at the request of 44 families to Bishop Doane of the Episcopal Diocese of New Jersey for services of the church in the City of Beverly. The first church, a white frame building erected on Copper Street, had an adjacent cemetery that still exists today. When the City of Beverly was incorporated in 1857, St. Stephen's established would become Beverly's first church.

By 1853, the congregation had outgrown the original wood church and land was purchased at the corner of Warren and Wilmerton Streets for a new structure. The new property allowed for the construction of a larger more elaborate church. The location also increased the prominence of the parish by its place on Warren Street, a main transportation corridor between Beverly, Burlington City and other industrial river towns. The church's steeple acted as a landmark beacon for shippers on the Delaware. On October 1, 1855, the present St. Stephen's Church was consecrated by the second bishop of the Diocese of New Jersey, the Right Reverend George Washington Doane.

== Early Church history and architecture ==
Built between 1853 and 1855, St. Stephen's represents a period in church architecture that sought to revive the spirit of the Gothic parish church, creating a worship space that was both spiritually reverential while at the same time expressing an architectural vocabulary of rational truth; in the building's ornament, materials and plan.

This return to the English Gothic architectural form was promoted in the 1830s in England and was at its height in America when St. Stephen's was constructed. The Ecclesiology movement was a reaction to a period in church history when architectural form of new churches became increasingly variable. The Ecclesiology movement feared this informality and inconsistency distracted from the basic moral and theological mission of the church.

The Basic principles underlying the Ecclesiological model church, which are exemplified in St. Stephen's, are a simple plan, basic materials and ornament that is complementary to the overall simplicity of the church.

The plan of the Ecclesiological church is simple: the nave (the portion of the church containing the center aisle and pews) and the chancel (the portion of the church containing the altar and choir). Ideally, the materials of the church should be stone, but wood could be used with the hope that the means to afford stone would become available in the future. The ornament of St. Stephen's, both simple and elegant in its execution, illustrates the restrained propriety the Ecclesiologists used in creating the medieval sense of the place they felt most spiritually truthful in a place of worship.

At the ceiling, a hybrid truss-arch system of roof support resembles the inside of a ship's hull. Though these structural timbers seem massive, they are actually secondary to the main rafters that are buried under the ceiling plaster.

== St. Stephen's stained glass windows ==
The collection of stained glass windows of St. Stephen's Church displays a historically significant range of stained glass styles from the 1850s into the early 20th century. Generally, the age of the windows range from the oldest located in the chancel to the newest located in the vestibule. St. Stephen's has windows ranging from the textured muffle and reeded glass panels of mid-19th century American Gothic windows; to works by J.R. Lamb, a rival of the Tiffany Glass studios; and modern windows dated from the 1970s and 1980s by Cherry Hill artist F. Paul Skelly.

== Church preservation effort ==
With the help of architectural firm Farewell Mills & Gatsch, the St. Stephen's community navigated through a seven-year-long New Jersey Historical Trust grants process obtaining awards for a preservation plan, engineering studies and finally construction.

Wu & Associates, Inc, the selected preservation contractor from nearby Cherry Hill, New Jersey, focused on restoring the church's “beacon” feature, the steeple. Following a lightning strike in 1983 the structure burned down two-thirds of the way. While the immediate problem was solved with a lightning rod, the replacement cedar shakes continued to be damaged by area wildlife.

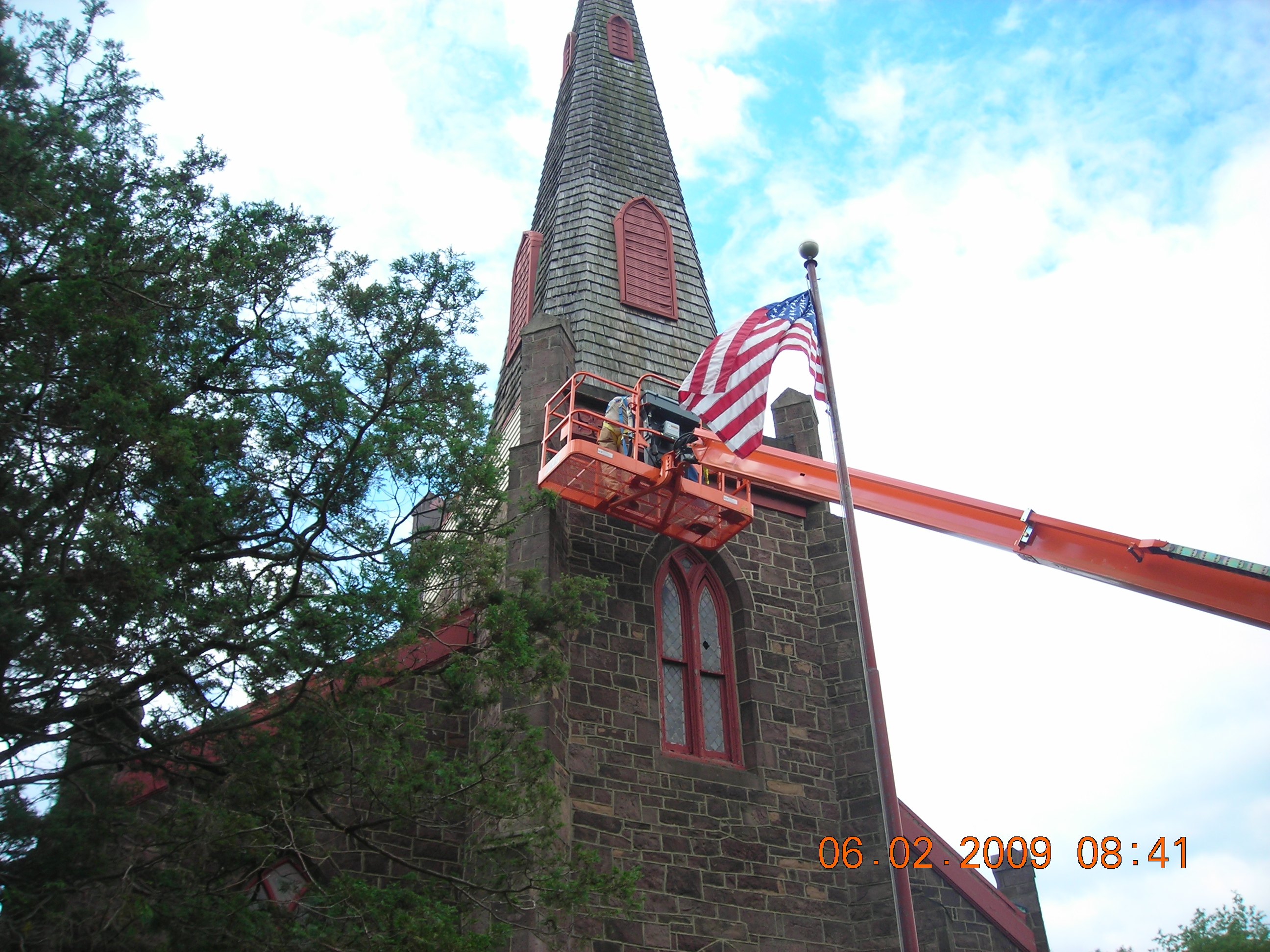
Steeple Work at St. Stephen's

In accordance with the New Jersey Historic Trust's wishes to preserve the origin of the church, the community and construction team researched the church's history. According to some old photos and a 1909 postcard, the steeple looks as dark as the roof and there is a good chance the original was slate as the newly constructed roof was decided upon.

Steel girding anchored in the tower masonry walls rather than the 150-year-old wood beams now support the steeple. New flooring, fresh but historically accurate paint colors, a clean church bell, and a releaded and repaired stained glass window in the tower were all additional improvements in St. Stephen's preservation efforts.

While the range of stained-glass window styles and woodwork within the building are the most elaborate of the church's designs, Wu & Associates work stabilizing the structure and preserving the simplicity of the building's design was important in saving the history of its architectural story and its place in Beverly's.

The grants funding the project were supplemented by not only the contributions of members, highlighted by the over $4,000 raised by the parish children's “Mile of Nickels” campaign, but also businesses and other people in the larger town community.
