= Beverly/Edgewater Park station =

Light rail station in New Jersey, USA

Beverly / Edgewater Park
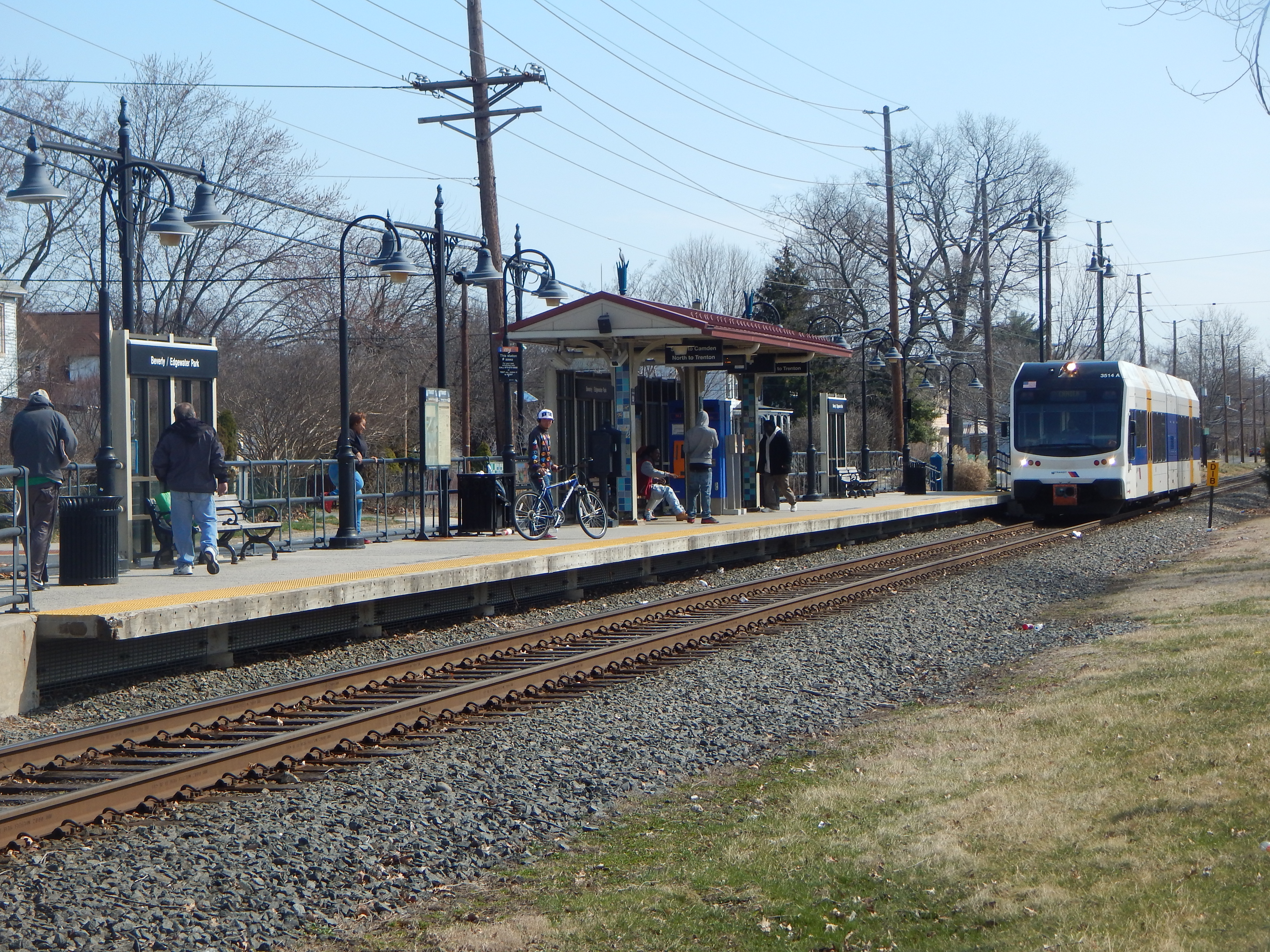
- A morning train approaches Beverly/Edgewater Park station in April 2015.

General information
- Location: Railroad Avenue; Beverly, New Jersey
- Coordinates: 40°3′40″N 74°54′55″W
- Owner: New Jersey Transit
- Platforms: 1 side platform
- Tracks: 1
- Connections: BurLINK: B1, B2

Construction
- Parking: 201 spaces, 7 accessible spaces
- Accessible: Yes

Other information
- Fare zone: 1

History
- Opened: March 15, 2004

Services
Preceding station	NJ Transit	Following station
Delanco toward Entertainment Center	River Line	Burlington South toward Trenton

Former services
Preceding station	Pennsylvania Railroad	Following station
Perkins toward Camden	Amboy Branch	Edgewater Park toward South Amboy
Location

Beverly/Edgewater Park station is a station on the River Line light rail system, located on Railroad Avenue in Beverly, Burlington County, New Jersey, U.S.

== History ==
The station site was home to the Pennsylvania Railroad's station of Beverly. Service between Trenton and Camden ended on June 28, 1963.

The station opened on March 15, 2004. Southbound service from the station is available to Camden, New Jersey. Northbound service is available to the Trenton Rail Station with connections to New Jersey Transit trains to New York City, SEPTA trains to Philadelphia, and Amtrak trains. Transfer to the PATCO Speedline is available at the Walter Rand Transportation Center.

Although located in the City of Beverly, the station also serves the Township of Edgewater Park, hence the dual name. Nearby recreational facilities in Edgewater Park include Memorial Field, and the Roosevelt Park and Pond. Memorial Field is a proposed location for the Delaware River Heritage Trail.
