= Beverly, New Jersey =

City in Burlington County, New Jersey, US

- City
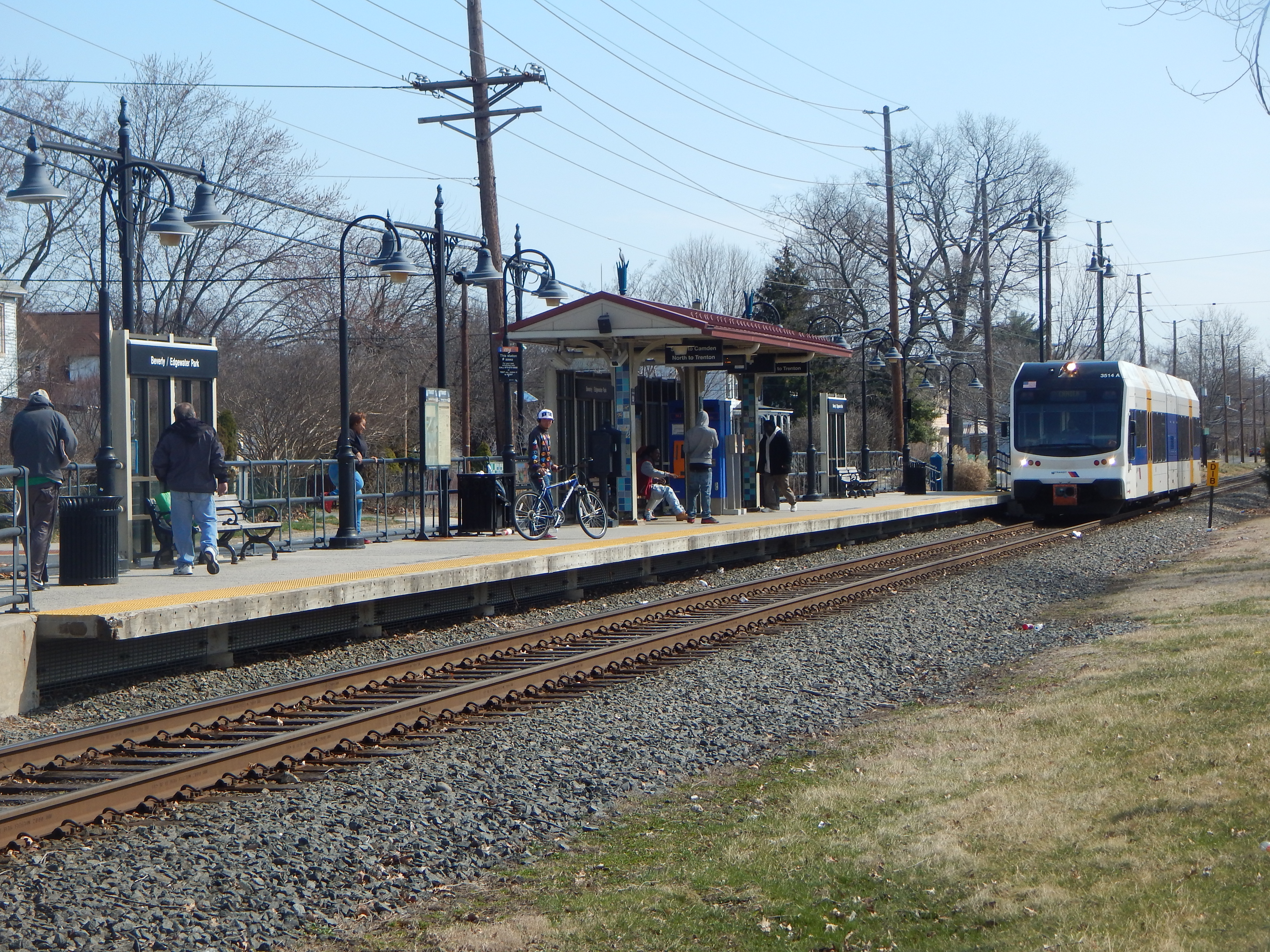
- Beverly/Edgewater Park station

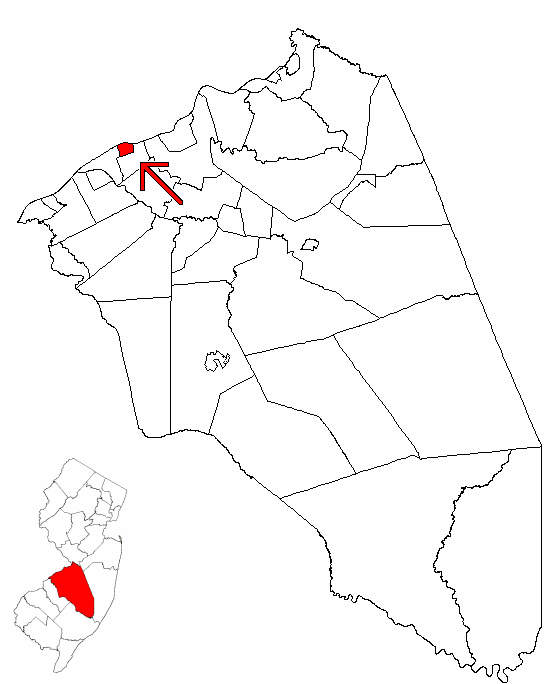
- Location of Beverly in Burlington County highlighted in red (right). Inset map: Location of Burlington County in New Jersey highlighted in red (left).

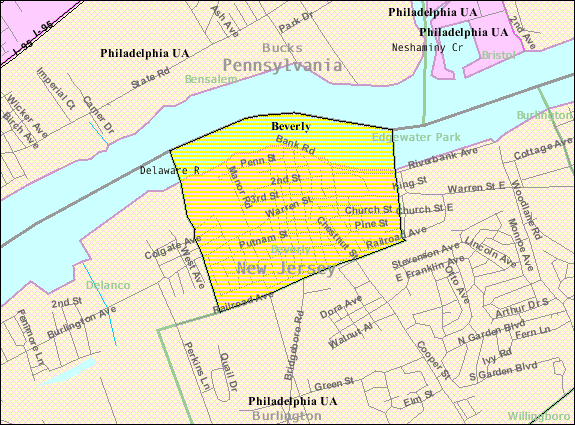
- Census Bureau map of Beverly, New Jersey

- Location in Burlington County Location in New Jersey Location in the United States
- Coordinates: 40.064811°N 74.921904°W
- Country: United States
- State: New Jersey
- County: Burlington
- Incorporated: March 5, 1850
- Named after: Beverley, England

Government
  - Type: City
  - Body: Common Council
  - Mayor: Cynthia Hall Miller (D, elected to term ending December 31, 2027)
  - Administrator: Rich Wolbert
  - Municipal clerk: Jessica Bolen

Area
  - Total: 0.76 sq mi (1.96 km^{2})
  - Land: 0.54 sq mi (1.40 km^{2})
  - Water: 0.22 sq mi (0.56 km^{2}) 28.16%
  - Rank: 524th of 565 in state 38th of 40 in county
- Elevation: 23 ft (7.0 m)

Population (2020)
  - Total: 2,499
  - Estimate (2023): 2,514
  - Rank: 469th of 565 in state 34th of 40 in county
  - Density: 4,617.1/sq mi (1,782.7/km^{2})
  - Rank: 125th of 565 in state 3rd of 40 in county
- Time zone: UTC−05:00 (Eastern (EST))
  - Summer (DST): UTC−04:00 (Eastern (EDT))
- ZIP Code: 08010
- Area code: 609
- FIPS code: 3400505740
- GNIS feature ID: 0885160
- Website: www.thecityofbeverly.com

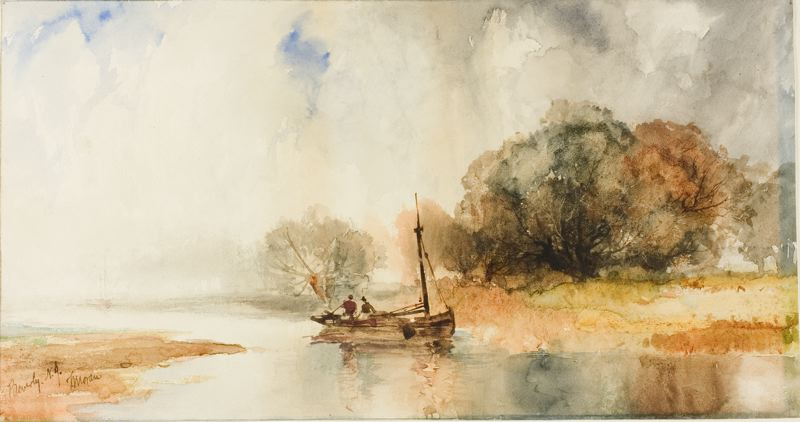
Watercolor painting by Thomas Moran depicting Beverly, New Jersey in the late 1800s

Beverly is a city in Burlington County in the U.S. state of New Jersey. As of the 2020 United States census, the city's population was 2,499, a decrease of 78 (−3.0%) from the 2010 census count of 2,577, which in turn had reflected a decline of 84 (−3.2%) from the 2,661 counted in the 2000 census. The city and all of Burlington County constitute a part of the Philadelphia metropolitan area.

Beverly was originally incorporated as a borough on March 5, 1850, within Willingboro Township. Beverly was incorporated as a city by an act of the New Jersey Legislature on April 13, 1857, replacing Beverly borough, based on the results of a referendum held that day. Beverly Township, formed in 1859, co-existed alongside Beverly City and was renamed as Delanco Township in 1926. The borough was named for Beverley, England.

The city had the 15th-highest property tax rate in New Jersey, with an equalized rate of 4.550% in 2020, compared to 2.676% in the county as a whole and a statewide average of 2.279%.

== Geography ==
According to the United States Census Bureau, the city had a total area of 0.76 square miles (1.96 km^{2}), including 0.54 square miles (1.40 km^{2}) of land and 0.21 square miles (0.56 km^{2}) of water (28.16%).

Beverly borders Delanco Township and Edgewater Park in Burlington County; and Bensalem Township across the Delaware River in Bucks County, Pennsylvania.

== Demographics ==
Historical population
Census	Pop.	Note	%±
1860	1,220		—
1870	1,418		16.2%
1880	1,759		24.0%
1890	1,957		11.3%
1900	1,950		−0.4%
1910	2,140		9.7%
1920	2,562		19.7%
1930	2,864		11.8%
1940	2,691		−6.0%
1950	3,084		14.6%
1960	3,400		10.2%
1970	3,105		−8.7%
1980	2,919		−6.0%
1990	2,973		1.8%
2000	2,661		−10.5%
2010	2,577		−3.2%
2020	2,499		−3.0%
2023 (est.)	2,514		0.6%
Population sources: 1860–2000; 1860–1920 1860–1870 1870; 1890–1910 1910–1930; 1940–2000 2000; 2010 2020

=== 2020 census ===
As of the 2020 census, Beverly had a population of 2,499. The median age was 39.5 years. 24.1% of residents were under the age of 18 and 15.7% of residents were 65 years of age or older. For every 100 females there were 95.8 males, and for every 100 females age 18 and over there were 89.4 males age 18 and over.

100.0% of residents lived in urban areas, while 0.0% lived in rural areas.

There were 971 households in Beverly, of which 33.1% had children under the age of 18 living in them. Of all households, 37.2% were married-couple households, 18.6% were households with a male householder and no spouse or partner present, and 34.5% were households with a female householder and no spouse or partner present. About 26.1% of all households were made up of individuals and 11.4% had someone living alone who was 65 years of age or older.

There were 1,084 housing units, of which 10.4% were vacant. The homeowner vacancy rate was 3.7% and the rental vacancy rate was 8.9%.

Racial composition as of the 2020 census
Race	Number	Percent
White	1,254	50.2%
Black or African American	682	27.3%
American Indian and Alaska Native	0	0.0%
Asian	43	1.7%
Native Hawaiian and Other Pacific Islander	2	0.1%
Some other race	202	8.1%
Two or more races	316	12.6%
Hispanic or Latino (of any race)	373	14.9%

=== 2010 census ===
The 2010 United States census counted 2,577 people, 1,002 households, and 671 families in the city. The population density was 4,645.4 per square mile (1,793.6/km^{2}). There were 1,086 housing units at an average density of 1,957.7 per square mile (755.9/km^{2}). The racial makeup was 61.66% (1,589) White, 29.88% (770) Black or African American, 0.16% (4) Native American, 0.78% (20) Asian, 0.00% (0) Pacific Islander, 2.68% (69) from other races, and 4.85% (125) from two or more races. Hispanic or Latino of any race were 9.16% (236) of the population.

Of the 1,002 households, 28.4% had children under the age of 18; 38.3% were married couples living together; 23.3% had a female householder with no husband present and 33.0% were non-families. Of all households, 26.4% were made up of individuals and 7.8% had someone living alone who was 65 years of age or older. The average household size was 2.57 and the average family size was 3.10.

23.1% of the population were under the age of 18, 9.5% from 18 to 24, 25.9% from 25 to 44, 30.2% from 45 to 64, and 11.3% who were 65 years of age or older. The median age was 38.5 years. For every 100 females, the population had 90.9 males. For every 100 females ages 18 and older there were 87.5 males.

The Census Bureau's 2006–2010 American Community Survey showed that (in 2010 inflation-adjusted dollars) median household income was $51,964 (with a margin of error of +/− $3,191) and the median family income was $61,058 (+/− $8,725). Males had a median income of $47,738 (+/− $9,129) and females $40,833 (+/− $13,858). The per capita income was $30,364 (+/− $4,953). About 14.1% of families and 15.2% of the population were below the poverty line, including 31.6% of those under age 18 and 12.5% of those age 65 or over.

=== 2000 census ===
At the 2000 United States census, there were 2,661 people, 960 households and 694 families residing in the city. The population density was 4,608.2 inhabitants per square mile (1,779.2/km^{2}). There were 1,042 housing units at an average density of 1,804.5 per square mile (696.7/km^{2}). The racial makeup of the city was 64.67% White, 28.75% African American, 0.11% Native American, 0.90% Asian, 1.43% from other races, and 4.13% from two or more races. Hispanic or Latino of any race were 4.58% of the population.

There were 960 households, of which 33.3% had children under the age of 18 living with them, 44.6% were married couples living together, 22.7% had a female householder with no husband present, and 27.7% were non-families. 21.6% of all households were made up of individuals, and 10.1% had someone living alone who was 65 years of age or older. The average household size was 2.77 and the average family size was 3.23.

28.3% of the population were under the age of 18, 8.8% from 18 to 24, 29.8% from 25 to 44, 21.2% from 45 to 64, and 11.8% who were 65 years of age or older. The median age was 35 years. For every 100 females, there were 88.7 males. For every 100 females age 18 and over, there were 85.3 males.

The median household income was $45,054 and the median family income was $49,519. Males had a median income of $35,954 and females $23,836. The per capita income was $17,760. About 8.5% of families and 11.5% of the population were below the poverty line, including 16.9% of those under age 18 and 6.9% of those age 65 or over.

== Government ==
=== Local government ===
Beverly is governed under the City form of New Jersey municipal government. The city is one of 15 municipalities (of the 564) statewide that use this traditional form of government. The governing body is comprised of an elected mayor and a five-member elected city council who are chosen at-large on a partisan basis to serve four-year terms of office as part of the November general election, with either two or three seats coming up for election in odd-numbered years. Responsibilities of the governing body include all executive and legislative functions.

As of 2026, the mayor of the City of Beverly is Democrat Cynthia Hall Miller, who was elected to serve the remainder of the term of office ending December 31, 2027. Members of the Beverly Common Council are Council President Bernardine Williams (D, 2027), Council President Pro-Tem Kelsey Snively (D, 2027), Ghana Clouden Jr. (D, 2029), Robert E. Lowden Jr. (D, 2029) and Ariel Piña (D, 2029).

In November 2025, Cynthia Hall Miller was elected as mayor to serve the two years remaining on the term of office that had been held by her husband, Randy Miller, until his death in July 2025.

Luis Crespo was appointed by the council in December 2012 to fill the vacant seat of Scott Perkins. In the November 2013 general election, Republican Mark Schwedes defeated Crespo to win the remaining two years of the unexpired term.

=== Federal, state and county representation ===
Beverly is located in the 3rd Congressional District and is part of New Jersey's 7th state legislative district.

For the 119th United States Congress, New Jersey's 3rd congressional district is currently represented Herb Conaway (D, Delran Township). New Jersey is represented in the United States Senate by Democrats Cory Booker (Newark, term ends 2027) and Andy Kim (Moorestown, term ends 2031).

For the 2026–2027 session, the 7th legislative district of the New Jersey Legislature is represented in the State Senate by Troy Singleton (D, Palmyra) and in the General Assembly by Carol A. Murphy (D, Mount Laurel) and Balvir Singh (D, Burlington Township).

Burlington County is governed by a Board of County Commissioners comprised of five members who are chosen at-large in partisan elections to serve three-year terms of office on a staggered basis, with either one or two seats coming up for election each year; at an annual reorganization meeting, the board selects a director and deputy director from among its members to serve a one-year term. As of 2026, Burlington County's Commissioners are: Director Felicia Hopson (D, Willingboro Township, term as commissioner ends December 31, 2027; term as director ends 2026), Deputy Director Allison Eckel (D, Medford, term as commissioner ends 2028; term as deputy director ends 2026), Randy Brolo (D, Lumberton, 2026; elected to an unexpired term), Tyler Burrell (D, Delran Township, 2027) and Tom Pullion (D, Edgewater Park, 2026).

Burlington County's constitutional officers are Clerk Joanne Schwartz (D, Southampton Township, 2028), Sheriff James H. Kostoplis (D, Bordentown, 2028) and Surrogate Brian J. Carlin (D, Burlington Township, 2026).

=== Politics ===
United States presidential election results for Beverly 2024 2020 2016 2012 2008 2004
Year	Republican		Democratic		Third party(ies)	
Year	No.	%	No.	%	No.	%
2024	354	36.38%	598	61.46%	21	2.16%
2020	375	32.16%	772	66.21%	19	1.63%
2016	349	33.82%	622	60.27%	61	5.91%
2012	330	28.92%	797	69.85%	14	1.23%
2008	365	29.72%	850	69.22%	13	1.06%
2004	398	36.95%	655	60.82%	24	2.23%

In March 2011, there were 1,543 registered voters in Beverly City, of whom 608 (39.4% vs. 33.3% countywide) were registered as Democrats, 262 (17.0% vs. 23.9%) were registered as Republicans and 673 (43.6% vs. 42.8%) were registered as Unaffiliated. There were no voters registered to other parties. Among the city's 2010 Census population, 59.9% (vs. 61.7% in Burlington County) were registered to vote, including 77.9% of those ages 18 and over (vs. 80.3% countywide).

In the 2012 presidential election, Democrat Barack Obama received 797 votes here (68.6% vs. 58.1% countywide), ahead of Republican Mitt Romney with 330 votes (28.4% vs. 40.2%) and other candidates with 14 votes (1.2% vs. 1.0%), among the 1,161 ballots cast by the city's 1,642 registered voters, for a turnout of 70.7% (vs. 74.5% in Burlington County). In the 2008 presidential election, Democrat Barack Obama received 850 votes here (68.6% vs. 58.4% countywide), ahead of Republican John McCain with 365 votes (29.5% vs. 39.9%) and other candidates with 13 votes (1.0% vs. 1.0%), among the 1,239 ballots cast by the city's 1,559 registered voters, for a turnout of 79.5% (vs. 80.0% in Burlington County). In the 2004 presidential election, Democrat John Kerry received 655 votes here (60.0% vs. 52.9% countywide), ahead of Republican George W. Bush with 398 votes (36.4% vs. 46.0%) and other candidates with 24 votes (2.2% vs. 0.8%), among the 1,092 ballots cast by the city's 1,442 registered voters, for a turnout of 75.7% (vs. 78.8% in the whole county).

Gubernatorial election results for Beverly
Year	Republican		Democratic		Third party(ies)	
Year	No.	%	No.	%	No.	%
2025	239	31.66%	509	67.42%	7	0.93%
2021	226	38.90%	349	60.07%	6	1.03%
2017	193	36.69%	322	61.22%	11	2.09%
2013	395	55.87%	300	42.43%	12	1.70%
2009	306	38.88%	422	53.62%	59	7.50%
2005	255	37.50%	388	57.06%	37	5.44%

In the 2013 gubernatorial election, Republican Chris Christie received 395 votes here (54.6% vs. 61.4% countywide), ahead of Democrat Barbara Buono with 300 votes (41.5% vs. 35.8%) and other candidates with 12 votes (1.7% vs. 1.2%), among the 723 ballots cast by the city's 1,625 registered voters, yielding a 44.5% turnout (vs. 44.5% in the county). In the 2009 gubernatorial election, Democrat Jon Corzine received 422 ballots cast (52.7% vs. 44.5% countywide), ahead of Republican Chris Christie with 306 votes (38.2% vs. 47.7%), Independent Chris Daggett with 47 votes (5.9% vs. 4.8%) and other candidates with 12 votes (1.5% vs. 1.2%), among the 801 ballots cast by the city's 1,590 registered voters, yielding a 50.4% turnout (vs. 44.9% in the county).

United States Senate election results for Beverly1
Year	Republican		Democratic		Third party(ies)	
Year	No.	%	No.	%	No.	%
2024	277	29.85%	623	67.13%	28	3.02%
2018	305	36.31%	477	56.79%	58	6.90%
2012	324	29.97%	751	69.47%	6	0.56%
2006	247	38.12%	376	58.02%	25	3.86%

United States Senate election results for Beverly2
Year	Republican		Democratic		Third party(ies)	
Year	No.	%	No.	%	No.	%
2020	353	30.94%	766	67.13%	22	1.93%
2014	212	36.87%	351	61.04%	12	2.09%
2013	153	39.03%	231	58.93%	8	2.04%
2008	354	31.64%	745	66.58%	20	1.79%

== Education ==
The Beverly City Schools serve students in public school for pre-kindergarten through eighth grade at Beverly City School. As of the 2022–23 school year, the district, comprised of one school, had an enrollment of 353 students and 36.0 classroom teachers (on an FTE basis), for a student–teacher ratio of 9.8:1.

For ninth through twelfth grades, students in public school from Beverly and Riverton attend Palmyra High School in Palmyra, as part of sending/receiving relationships with the Palmyra Public Schools. As of the 2022–23 school year, the high school had an enrollment of 388 students and 34.3 classroom teachers (on an FTE basis), for a student–teacher ratio of 11.3:1.

Students from Beverly, and from all of Burlington County, are eligible to attend the Burlington County Institute of Technology, a countywide public school district that serves the vocational and technical education needs of students at the high school and post-secondary level at its campuses in Medford and Westampton.

== Transportation ==
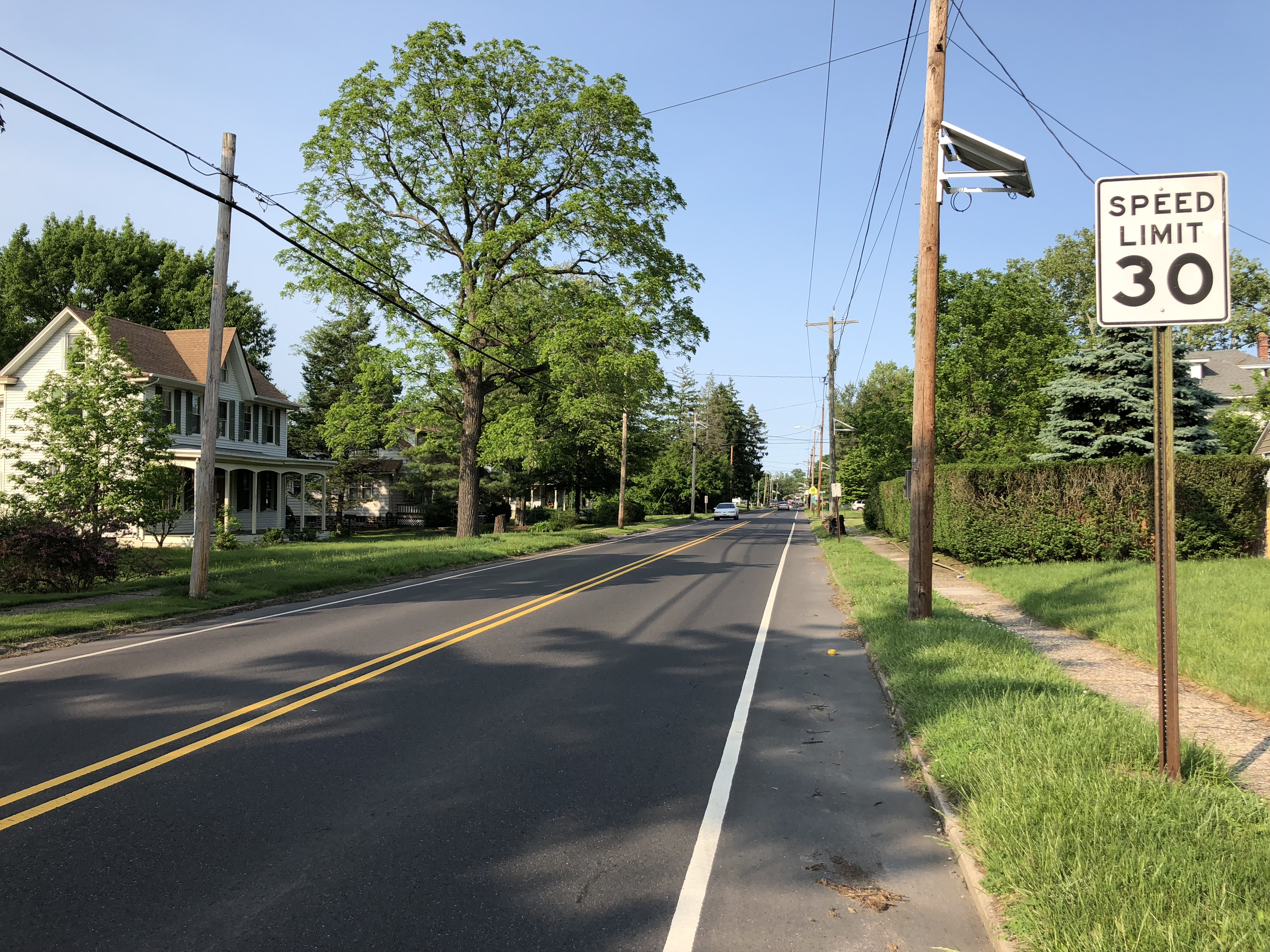
County Route 543, the most prominent road in Beverly

=== Roads and highways ===
As of May 2010, the city had a total of 12.53 miles (20.17 km) of roadways, of which 10.84 miles (17.45 km) were maintained by the municipality and 1.69 miles (2.72 km) by Burlington County.

County Route 543 is the most prominent roadway in Beverly.

=== Public transportation ===
The Beverly/Edgewater Park station provides service between the Trenton Transit Center in Trenton and the Walter Rand Transportation Center (and other stops) in Camden on NJ Transit's River Line light rail system.

NJ Transit provides bus service on route 419 between Burlington and Camden.

BurLink bus service is offered on the B1 route (between Beverly and Pemberton) and on the B2 route (between Beverly and Westampton).

== Points of interest ==
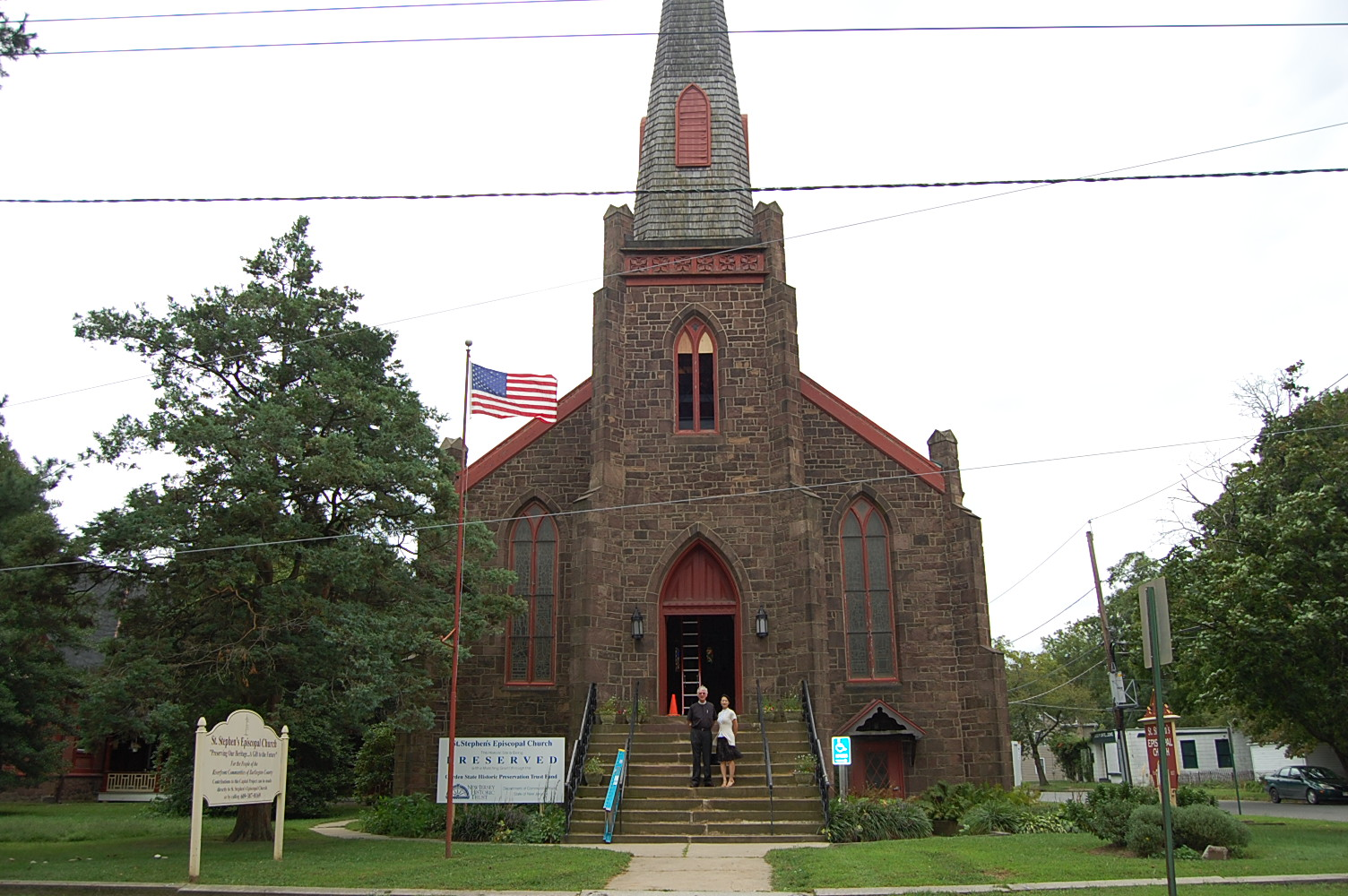
St. Stephen's Episcopal Church in Beverly, New Jersey

- Beverly National Cemetery was created in 1863 with the purchase of a single acre of land and was expanded five times from 1936 to 1951, before being added to the National Register of Historic Places in 1997.
- St. Stephen's Episcopal Church, consecrated by the Episcopal Diocese of New Jersey in 1837, was added to the National Register of Historic Places in 1999. The church, which celebrated its 175th anniversary in 2012, had its tower and steeple renovated at a cost of $450,000 raised from parish members and local organizations.

== Notable people ==
People who were born in, residents of, or otherwise closely associated with Beverly include:

- Grace Alekhine (1876–1956), artist and chess master
- Eleanor Bisbee (1893–1956), journalist, Universalist minister, philosopher and college professor
- Sam Calderone (1926–2006), Major League Baseball catcher who played for three seasons
- John Lowden Knight (1915–2001), professor, university administrator, and a Methodist theologian
- A. Merritt (1884–1943), author best known for his fantasy works
- Barney Schultz (1926–2015), pitcher who played in the Major Leagues for the St. Louis Cardinals, Detroit Tigers, and Chicago Cubs
- James F. Scott (1942–2020), physicist and research director at the Cavendish Laboratory
