= David Laury =

American basketball player (born 1993)

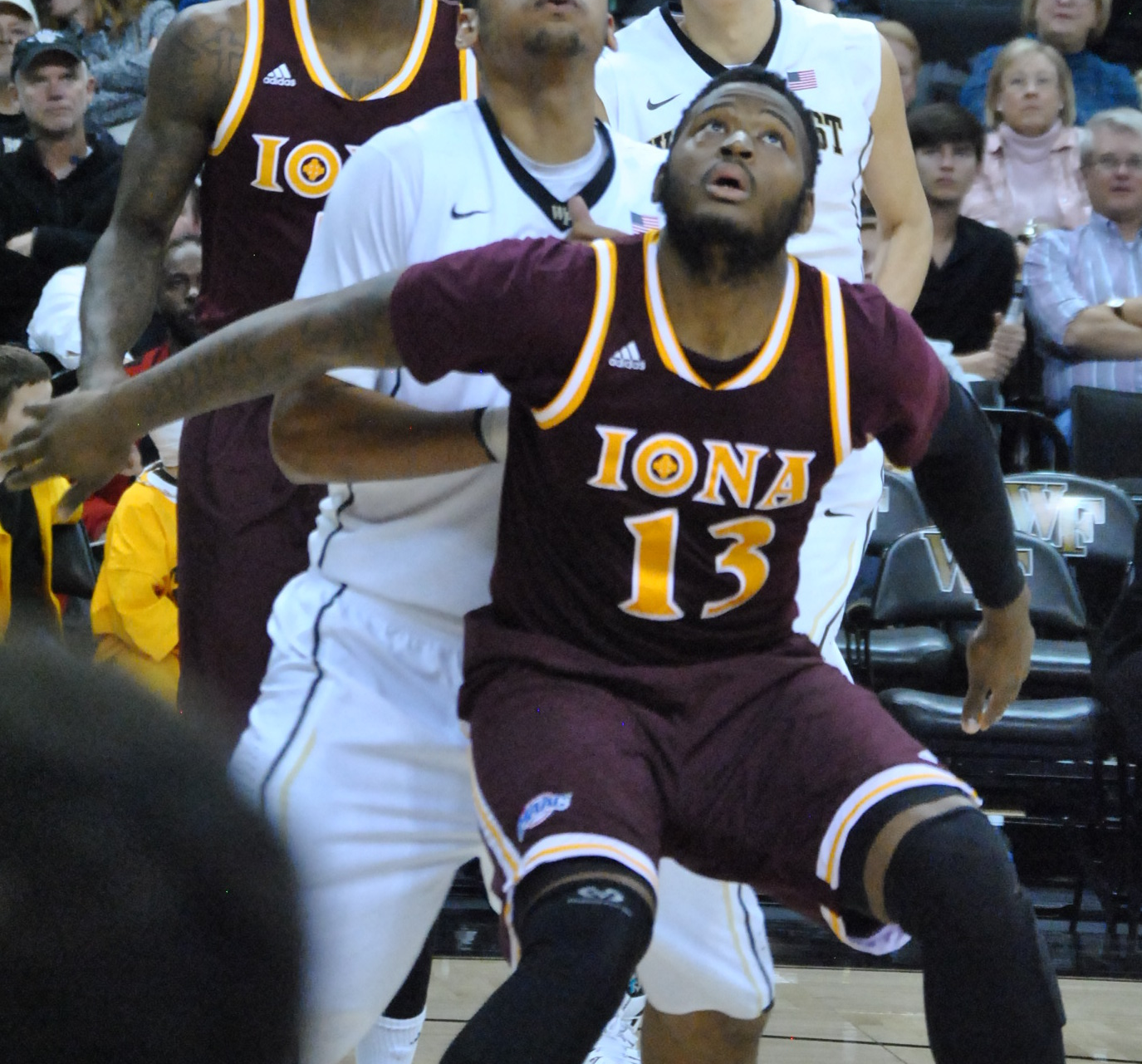
- Laury playing for Iona in 2014

Personal information
- Born: April 9, 1993 (age 33) East Orange, New Jersey, U.S.
- Listed height: 6 ft 8 in (2.03 m)
- Listed weight: 245 lb (111 kg)

Career information
- High school: Collingswood (Collingswood, New Jersey); Riverside (Riverside Township, New Jersey); Nia Prep (East Orange, New Jersey)
- College: Lamar State (2010–2011); Iona (2012–2015)
- NBA draft: 2015: undrafted
- Playing career: 2015–2019
- Position: Power forward

Career history
- 2015–2017: Delaware 87ers
- 2017: Windy City Bulls
- 2017: Indios de Mayagüez
- 2017–2018: Maccabi Ashdod
- 2019: Brujos de Guayama
- 2019: Soles de Mexicali

Career highlights
- MAAC Player of the Year (2015); First-team All-MAAC (2015)

David Laury III (born April 9, 1993) is an American former professional basketball player. He played college basketball for Lamar State and Iona before playing professionally in the NBA G League, Puerto Rico and Israel.

== High school career ==
Laury grew up in New Jersey. He spent his freshman season at Collingswood High School in Collingswood, his sophomore and junior seasons at Riverside High School in Riverside Township, then his senior year at Nia Prep in East Orange. At Nia, he helped lead coach Vincent Robinson's squad to a 26–6 overall mark.

== College career ==
Laury began his college career at Lamar State where as a freshman, he averaged 16.2 points and 9.8 rebounds per game while shooting nearly 60% from the field and posted 14 double-digit point efforts and eight double-doubles.

As a sophomore, Laury transferred to Iona where he averaged 20.1 points and 9.5 rebounds per game as a senior, second in both categories in the MAAC. For that, he was named the MAAC Player of the Year. He led Iona to a regular season MAAC championship and had 16 double-doubles.

== Professional career ==
After going undrafted in the 2015 NBA draft, Laury signed with Yeşilgiresun Belediye of the Turkish Basketball League on June 28, 2015. He later left the team prior to the start of the regular season and returned to the United States. On October 31, he was selected by the Delaware 87ers with the eighth overall pick in the 2015 NBA Development League Draft. On March 2, 2017, Laury was traded to the Windy City Bulls.

On August 5, 2017, Laury signed with the Israeli club Maccabi Ashdod for the 2017–18 season. On October 29, 2017, Laury recorded 22 points, shooting 8-for-10 from the field, along with 11 rebounds and 3 assists in an 86–74 win over Hapoel Jerusalem. Two days later, Laury was named co-Israeli League Round 4 MVP, alongside his teammate Sek Henry.

On October 21, 2018, Laury was added to the training camp roster of the Windy City Bulls of the NBA G League. He did not make the final roster.

On November 24, 2019, Laury returned to Israel for a second stint, signing with Hapoel Tel Aviv for the rest of the season. However, four days later, he parted ways with Hapoel for personal reasons.

== The Basketball Tournament ==
David Laury played for Gael Nation in the 2018 edition of The Basketball Tournament. In 2 games, he averaged 15 points, 6.5 rebounds, and 2 blocks per game. Gael Nation reached the second round before falling to Armored Athlete.

== Personal life ==
Laury majored in Mass Communications.
