= Riverside High School (New Jersey) =

High school in Burlington County, New Jersey, US

Location
- 112 East Washington Street; Riverside Township, Burlington County, New Jersey 08075; United States; 40.034705°N 74.955641°W

Information
- Type: Public high school
- School district: Riverside School District
- NCES School ID: 341401001234
- Principal: Buddy Micucci
- Faculty: 40.8 FTEs
- Grades: 9-12
- Enrollment: 471 (as of 2023–24)
- Student to teacher ratio: 11.5:1
- Colors: Maroon and white
- Athletics conference: Burlington County Scholastic League (general); West Jersey Football League (football)
- Mascot: Rocky the Ram
- Team name: Rams
- Rival: Palmyra High School
- Website: www.riverside.k12.nj.us/rhs-home

Riverside High School is a four-year comprehensive public high school that serves students in ninth through twelfth grades from Riverside Township in Burlington County, in the U.S. state of New Jersey, operating as the lone secondary school of the Riverside School District.

As of the 2023–24 school year, the school had an enrollment of 471 students and 40.8 classroom teachers (on an FTE basis), for a student–teacher ratio of 11.5:1. There were 189 students (40.1% of enrollment) eligible for free lunch and 74 (15.7% of students) eligible for reduced-cost lunch.

Students from Delanco Township attend Riverside High School as part of a sending/receiving relationship with the Delanco Township School District.

== Awards, recognition and rankings ==
The school was the 295th-ranked public high school in New Jersey out of 339 schools statewide in New Jersey Monthly magazine's September 2014 cover story on the state's "Top Public High Schools," using a new ranking methodology. The school had been ranked 301st in the state of 328 schools in 2012, after being ranked 281st in 2010 out of 322 schools listed. The magazine ranked the school 298th in 2008 out of 316 schools. The school was the 266th-ranked public high school in New Jersey out of 316 schools statewide, in New Jersey Monthly magazine's September 2006 cover story on the state's Top Public High Schools.

== Athletics ==
The Riverside High School Rams compete in the Burlington County Scholastic League (BCSL), which consists of nineteen public and non-public high schools covering Burlington County, Mercer County and Ocean County in Central Jersey, operating under the jurisdiction of the New Jersey State Interscholastic Athletic Association (NJSIAA). With 349 students in grades 10–12, the school was classified by the NJSIAA for the 2022–24 school years as Group I South for most athletic competition purposes. The football team competes in the Horizon Division of the 94-team West Jersey Football League superconference and was classified by the NJSIAA as Group I South for football for 2024–2026, which included schools with 185 to 482 students. The school mascot is Rocky the Ram and the colors are maroon and white.

Students from Delran Township, which partly encircles Riverside, had attended the school until 1976. Because of its large high school student population at that time, the school competed in Group III sports programs and was competitive with other large schools. Outside of its annual Thanksgiving Day game against Florence Township Memorial High School, the Rams also had ongoing rivalries with nearby Holy Cross High School, Cinnaminson High School and Rancocas Valley Regional High School in Mount Holly. Since Delran Township established its own high school and the high school grade population dropped at Riverside, the school mostly competes in Group I and some of those rivalries have ended.

The Palmyra High School / Riverside football rivalry for the Fred Wilbert Memorial Trophy dates from 1928, and Palmyra leads that series 62-23-3, after a 39-22 victory in 2019; Palmyra has won 19 consecutive games in the series.

The boys' basketball team won the Group I title in 1954 (against runner-up Park Ridge High School in the finals of the tournament) and won the Group II state championship in 1959 (vs. North Arlington High School). The 1954 team won the Group I title with a 57-54 win against Park Ridge in the championship game played at the Elizabeth Armory, finishing the season at 25-0 and becoming the first team in seven years to win a playoff title and complete the season undefeated. The team won the 1959 Group title with a 65-48 victory in the playoff finals against a North Arlington team that had come into the game undefeated.

The boys' soccer team won the Group I state championship in 1961 (vs. Blairstown High School), 1976 (as co-champions with Harrison High School), 1979 (as co-champion with Chatham Borough High School), 1980 (defeating North Warren Regional High School in the final game of the tournament), 1982 (vs. Midland Park High School) and 1985 (vs. Chatham Borough).

The boys' baseball team won the Group I state championships in 1996 (defeating Whippany Park High School in the playoff finals) and 1997 (vs. Glen Rock High School). The 1996 team ended the season with an 18-5 record after defeating Whippany Park by a score of 4-2 in the finals to win the Group I state title.

The girls' soccer team defeated Butler High School in the championship game to win the 2005 Group I state title.

== The Marching Rams ==
The Marching Rams compete within USBands, Cavalcade of Bands, and Tournament of Bands.

=== Past shows ===
Year	Theme	Placement	Division	Circuit
2003	COLOR MY WORLD	1st Place	Class 1	Eastern Marching Band Association
2004	DISCO FEVER	3rd Place	Group 1A	USBands
2005	LATIN EXPLOSION!	2nd Place	Group 1A	USBands
2006	SIMON SAYS...	11th Place	Independence Open	Cavalcade of Bands
2007	THE BEST OF QUEEN	8th Place	Independence A	Cavalcade of Bands
2008	The Beatles	5th Place	Group 1A	USBands
2009	The Jackson 5	6th Place	Independence A	Cavalcade of Bands
2010	Carmen in Seville	3rd Place	Independence A	Cavalcade of Bands
2011	FLIGHT	6th Place	Group 1A	USBands
2012	SIMON SAID…	12th Place	Independence Open	Cavalcade of Bands
2013	I Believe!	2nd Place	Group 1A	USBands
2014	United We Stand!	3rd Place	Group 1A	USBands
2015	Chuck Mangione	5th Place	Group 1A	USBands
2016	Afterburner!	6th Place	Independence Open	Cavalcade of Bands
2017	Aerodynamics	5th Place	Group 1A	Tournament of Bands
2018	Encounter	9th Place	Group 1A	Tournament of Bands
2019		Silver	Group 1F	Tournament of Bands

== Administration ==
The school's principal is Buddy Micucci. His core administration team includes two assistant principals.

== Notable alumni ==
- Jim Bailey (1938-2015), singer, film, television / stage actor and female impersonator.
- Kenneth William Faulkner (born 1947, class of 1966), former teacher, school administrator and basketball coach at Burlington Township High School.
- David Laury (born 1993), former professional basketball player
- Hal Wagner (1915-1979), MLB catcher from 1937-1949.
