= Jim Bailey (entertainer) =

American actor

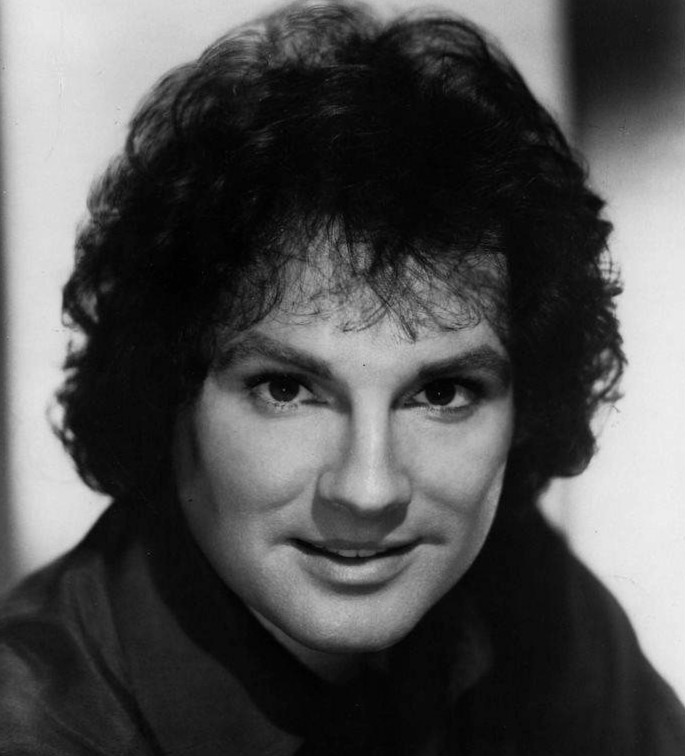
- Bailey in 1973
- Born: James William Bailey; January 10, 1938; Philadelphia, Pennsylvania, U.S.
- Died: May 30, 2015 (aged 77); Los Angeles, California
- Occupations: Film, television and stage actor, concert and recording artist

James William Bailey (January 10, 1938 – May 30, 2015) was an American singer, film, television and stage actor, and female impersonator.

== Early years ==
Bailey as comic actress Phyllis Diller

Bailey was born on January 10, 1938, in Philadelphia to Sara and Claude Bailey. He had one brother, Claude. As a teenager he studied opera at the Philadelphia Conservatory of Music, and was on the television program The Children's Hour for almost a year, where he performed by acting, singing and dancing. His family moved to Palmyra, New Jersey when he was ten years old, and then Riverside Township, where he attended Riverside High School.

== Career ==
Bailey appeared in over 70 television and movie roles, including appearances on Ally McBeal, Here's Lucy, Night Court, The Rockford Files, Switch, Vega$, The Tonight Show Starring Johnny Carson, The Ed Sullivan Show, The Carol Burnett Show, The Merv Griffin Show, Late Night with David Letterman, The Mike Douglas Show, The Dean Martin Show and The Joan Rivers Show.

Bailey's fame began in the late 1960s when he created the "illusions" of singers Judy Garland, Barbra Streisand, and Peggy Lee by vocally imitating them in his own operatically trained voice. Bailey appeared on concert stages throughout the world, including headlining in Las Vegas at hotels such as The Thunderbird, Caesars Palace, The Desert Inn, The Sands, Harrah's, The Dunes and performing at New York City's Carnegie Hall a total of nine times and The Palladium Theater in London a total of 17 times. Bailey also performed for the British royal family twice and for four United States presidents.

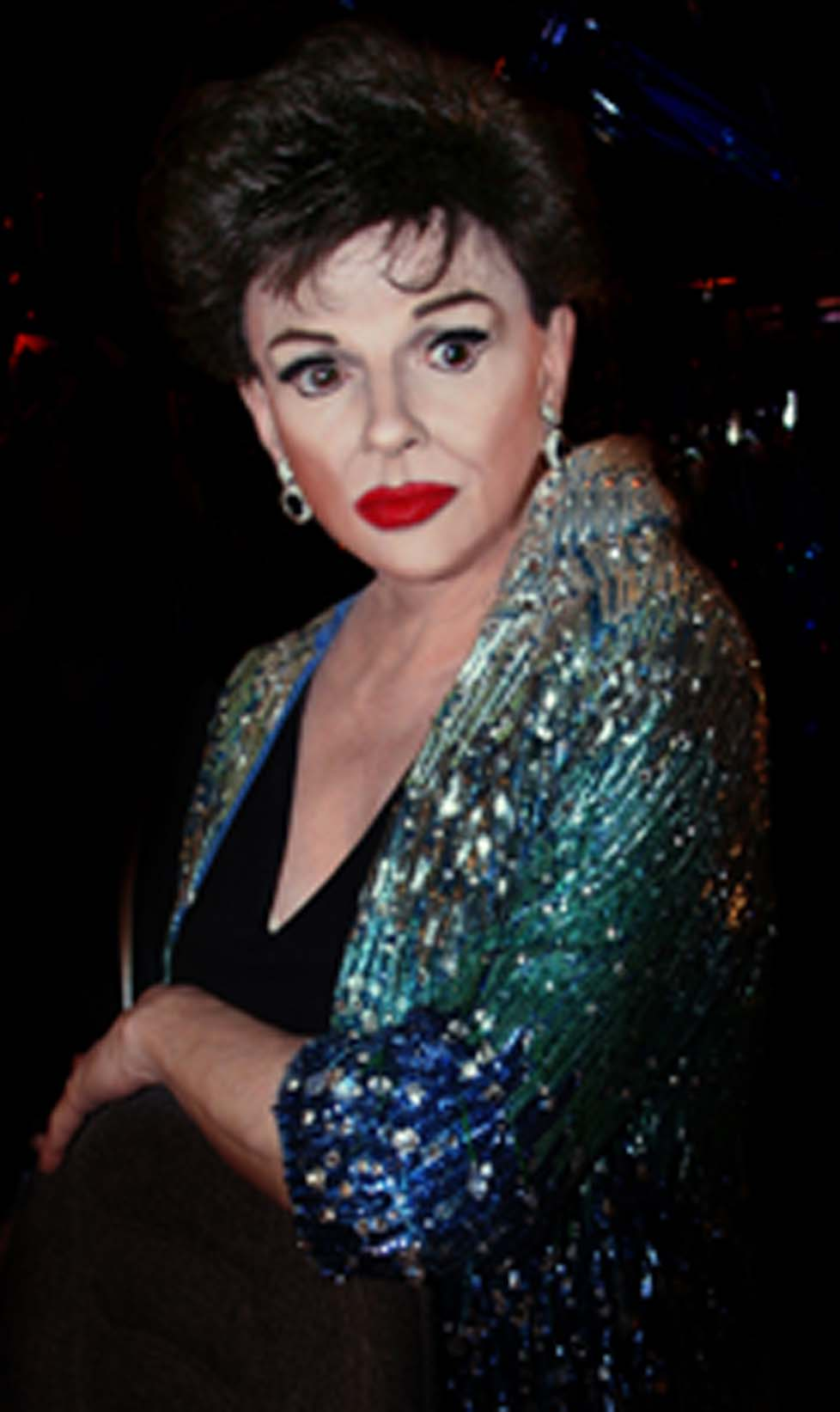
Jim Bailey as Judy Garland in London

From 1966 through to 1968, Bailey played summer stock in such shows as The Boy Friend, Calamity Jane with Ginger Rogers, Bells are Ringing and Wildcat with Gale Storm.

During this time, Bailey was introduced to and became friends with Phyllis Diller. Bailey learned to re-create the comedian/actress's personality and later added her to his repertoire. In 1968, Bailey moved to Los Angeles and put together a nightclub act with Michael Greer, performing at the Redwood Room, this time adding Judy Garland to his repertoire. When Garland came to see Bailey's show, she jumped up onto the stage and asked him to sing a song with her. Bailey agreed and the two sang a duet of "Bye Bye Blackbird", which Bailey had intended to sing as himself.

The two later became friends, and Garland became Bailey's mentor. The two remained friends until Garland's death in 1969. In 1970, Bailey was booked in Las Vegas and became an overnight sensation. He appeared on The Ed Sullivan Show, which helped launch an international career. His performance as Judy Garland singing "The Man that Got Away" was such a phenomenon he was asked back a couple of months later to perform as Peggy Lee. He also performed as himself on both shows.

Bailey's success continued as he appeared for performances at New York's Carnegie Hall, the London Palladium, and the Dorothy Chandler Pavilion in Los Angeles. While in London, he performed on the legendary David Frost's show. He then guest starred on the popular television variety show The Carol Burnett Show, where the two sang a comedic duet of "Happy Days Are Here Again" with Bailey appearing as Barbra Streisand, and made several appearances on The Tonight Show Starring Johnny Carson.

Bailey was approached by Lucille Ball in 1972 after she saw him at the Dorothy Chandler Pavilion and asked him to guest star on her popular television show Here's Lucy. Ball was so impressed by Bailey and his performance, she titled the show Lucy and Jim Bailey, and she also threw a party for him after the show's taping. The two remained close friends until Ball's death in 1989. Bailey also became very close friends with Ball's daughter Lucie Arnaz. The two remained close friends, doing benefit performances in honor of her late mother and father at the Lucy Desi festival in Jamestown, New York. In 1973, Bailey was asked to return to Carnegie Hall for two nights to perform again. This time, he was approached by United Artists to record and release his performance. The album became a success and was sold worldwide.

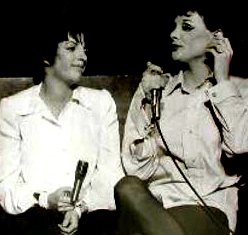
Liza Minnelli and Jim Bailey

Also in 1973, Bailey teamed with Liza Minnelli, daughter of his mentor Judy Garland, in Las Vegas at The Flamingo. The two put together a concert recreating the performances by Minnelli and her late mother in London, with Bailey standing in as Garland. The "Judy and Liza Concert" was met with great success; additionally, the show opened with Jim as Judy singing "Well, Hello Liza" just as they had done at the Palladium years earlier. Later, Minnelli made a gift to Bailey of one of her late mother's treasured pearl rings.

The mid-1970s saw Bailey as a mainstay in showrooms in Las Vegas; it was at this time he was named Las Vegas Entertainer of the Year. He also was booked for concerts around the world, including the O'Keefe Centre in Toronto, and venues in Australia and South America.

Bailey also performed at some major venues; he did a show for Queen Elizabeth II and her husband Prince Philip (as Barbra Streisand and himself) and also returned to Carnegie Hall and the London Palladium doing multiple nights at each venue.

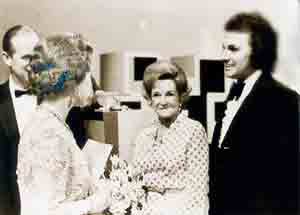
Bailey with Queen Elizabeth II, Prince Philip, and Beryl Reid

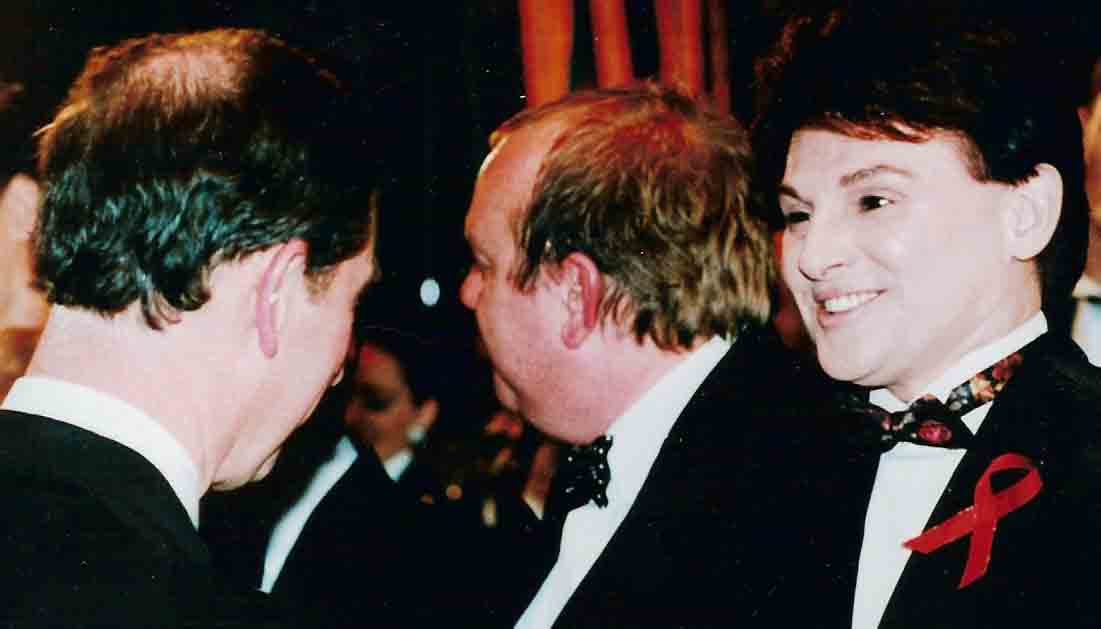
Jim Bailey with Prince Charles

In the late 1980s, he began to appear again in feature films. Because Barbra Streisand was not performing on the night club and concert circuit in the mid-1980s, Bailey decided to re-create some of her great movie performances and adapt them to his stage performances. In the late 1980s, he also toured with the musical Nite Club Confidential. Ten years later, in 1995, he performed at an event for Streisand, Clint Eastwood, Warren Beatty, and others.

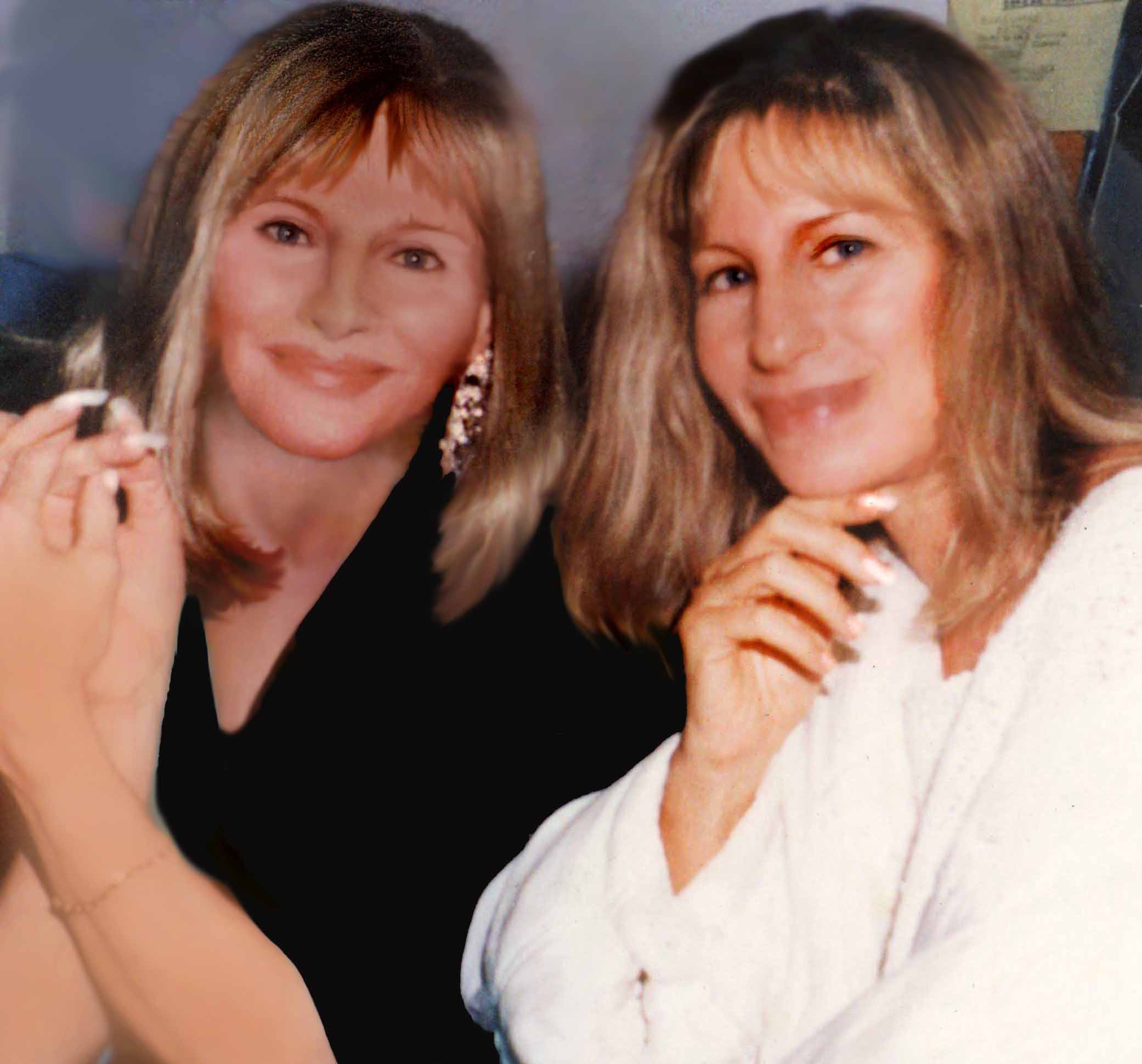
Jim Bailey as Barbra, with Barbra Streisand

In the 1990s, Bailey performed for Diana, Princess of Wales and Prince Charles in London. He again performed at Carnegie Hall and the London Palladium, as well as another long stint at The Sands in Las Vegas and Harrah's in all of their main showrooms. After touring extensively in the 1990s, Bailey opened the Jim Bailey Theater in Palm Springs, California, but closed the theater just 10 months later when offers were coming in for more theatrical work.

Bailey also appeared in plays and in numerous other TV guest roles, including as a transgender character on Night Court in 1985 as well as a gay character on an episode of Ally McBeal in 2001; regarding his role on the latter, he said to Boston-based In Newsweekly "I'm glad I could portray a real and positive gay character on the show…The character lost his lover, but he had dignity, and his work was important to him."

Bailey continued performing his characterizations, including benefits for AIDS research charities around the world. In July 2008, Bailey was slated to appear in Hollywood, London, New York and San Francisco, marking 40 years since he first performed as Garland in 1968.

In June 2009, Bailey played London's West End for the 40th anniversary of Judy's death. Susie Boyt of The Times wrote "There is nothing camp or stagey about his act—it can scarcely even be described as an act, for Bailey inhabits Garland's persona to such an extent that, well, there she is. It is a supreme illusion, a sort of perfect madness."

== Death ==
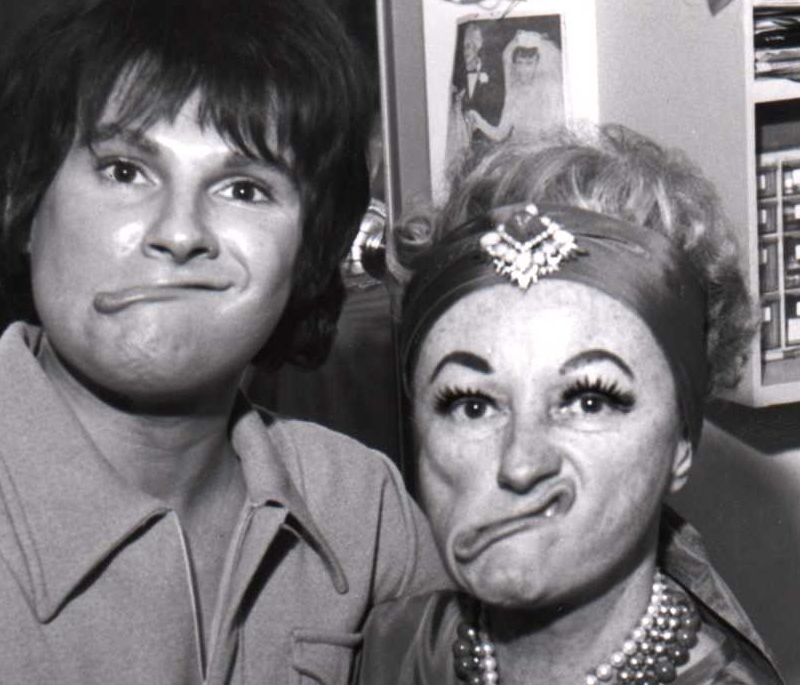
Jim Bailey with Phyllis Diller

Bailey died May 30, 2015, of cardiac arrest due to complications of pneumonia at Pacifica Hospital of the Valley in Sun Valley, California, according to his manager of 27 years, Stephen Campbell. He was survived by his brother.

=== Discography ===
- Jim Bailey (1972)
- Jim Bailey Live at Carnegie Hall (1973)
- Mostly Mercer (1986)
- Club Verbotten (1997)
- Voices (1998)
- Judy Jim Judy (2002)

=== Singles ===
- "Every Minute Every Day" (1972)
- "When I Found You" (1972)
- "Love Song" (1973)
- "All I Ask Of You" (1988)
