= Riverside School District (New Jersey) =

School district in New Jersey, U.S.

Address
- 112 East Washington Street Riverside, Burlington County, New Jersey, 08075; United States
- Coordinates: 40.034705°N 74.955641°W

District information
- Grades: Pre-K to 12
- Superintendent: Michael Adams
- Business administrator: Robert O'Brien
- Schools: 3

Students and staff
- Enrollment: 1,470 (as of 2019–20)
- Faculty: 108.4 FTEs
- Student–teacher ratio: 13.6:1

Other information
- District Factor Group: B
- Website: www.riverside.k12.nj.us
Ind.	Per pupil	District spending	Rank (*)	K-12 average	%± vs. average
1A	Total Spending	$16,772	12	$18,891	−11.2%
1	Budgetary Cost	13,250	18	14,783	−10.4%
2	Classroom Instruction	7,935	23	8,763	−9.4%
6	Support Services	1,803	11	2,392	−24.6%
8	Administrative Cost	1,493	11	1,485	0.5%
10	Operations & Maintenance	1,518	21	1,783	−14.9%
13	Extracurricular Activities	468	31	268	74.6%
16	Median Teacher Salary	63,449	32	64,043
Data from NJDoE 2014 Taxpayers' Guide to Education Spending. *Of K-12 districts with up to 1,800 students. Lowest spending=1; Highest=49

The Riverside School District is a comprehensive community public school district that serves students in pre-kindergarten through twelfth grade from Riverside Township, in Burlington County, in the U.S. state of New Jersey.

As of the 2019–20 school year, the district, comprising three schools, had an enrollment of 1,470 students and 108.4 classroom teachers (on an FTE basis), for a student–teacher ratio of 13.6:1.

Students from Delanco Township attend Riverside High School as part of a sending/receiving relationship with the Delanco Township School District.

== History ==
In 1948, during de jure educational segregation in the United States, the district had a school for black children.

The district had been classified by the New Jersey Department of Education as being in District Factor Group "B", the second lowest of eight groupings. District Factor Groups organize districts statewide to allow comparison by common socioeconomic characteristics of the local districts. From lowest socioeconomic status to highest, the categories are A, B, CD, DE, FG, GH, I and J.

== Schools ==
Schools in the district (with 2019–20 enrollment data from the National Center for Education Statistics) are:

Elementary school

- Riverside Elementary School with 708 students in grades PreK–5
  - Scott Shumway, principal

Middle school

- Riverside Middle School with 292 students in grades 6–8
  - Elizabeth Follis, principal

High school

- Riverside High School with 423 students in grades 9–12
  - Todd Pae, principal

== Administration ==
Core members of the district's administration are:

- Michael Adams, superintendent
- Robert O'Brien, business administrator and board secretary

== Board of education ==
The district's board of education, comprised of nine members, sets policy and oversees the fiscal and educational operation of the district through its administration. As a Type II school district, the board's trustees are elected directly by voters to serve three-year terms of office on a staggered basis, with three seats up for election each year held (since 2012) as part of the November general election. The board appoints a superintendent to oversee the district's day-to-day operations and a business administrator to supervise the business functions of the district. A tenth member is appointed by Delanco Township to represent its interests on the Riverside Township Board of Education.
