= Delanco Township, New Jersey =

Township in Burlington County, New Jersey, US

- Township
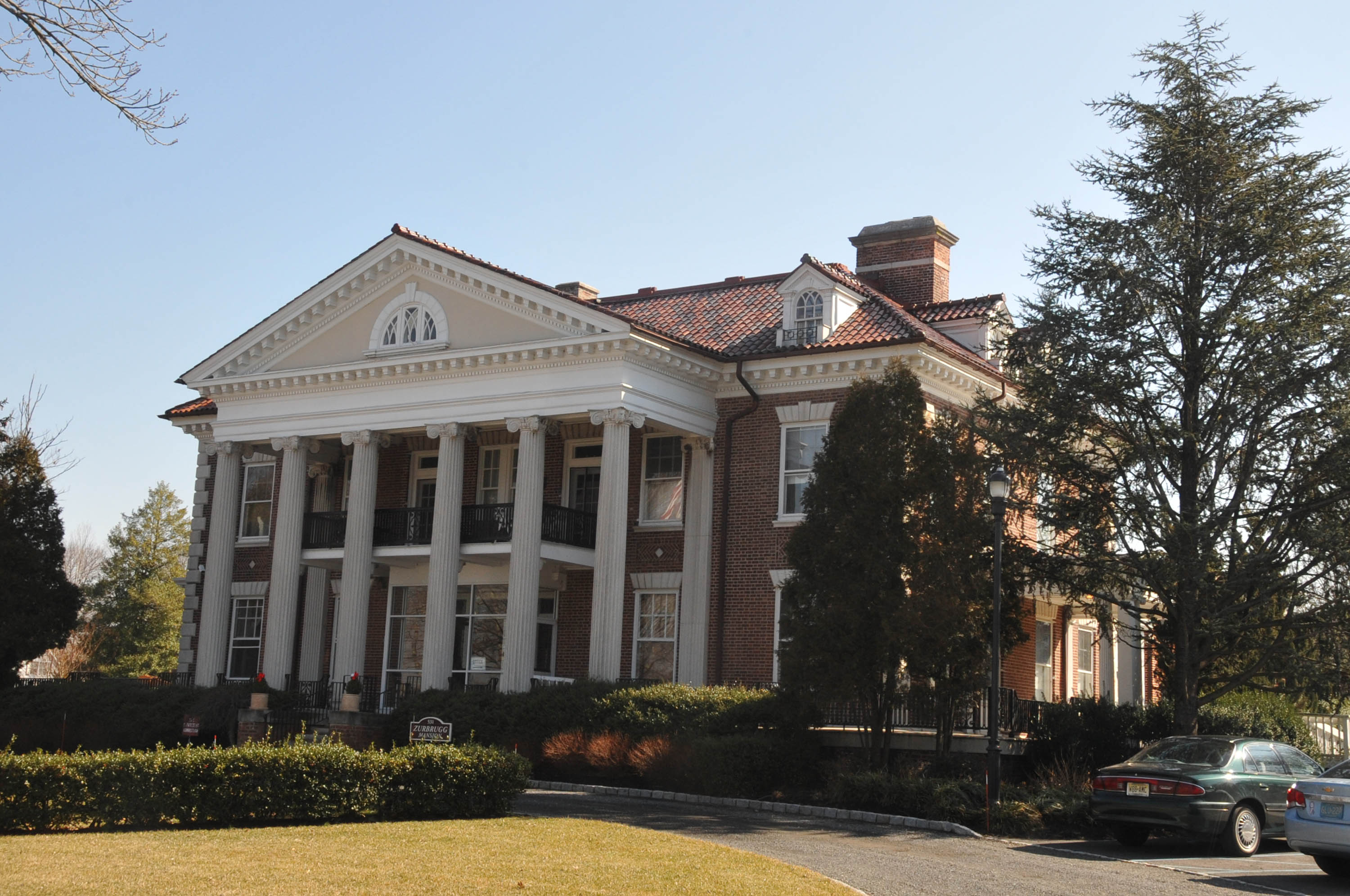
- Zurbrugg Mansion
- Motto: "A Timeless Treasure"
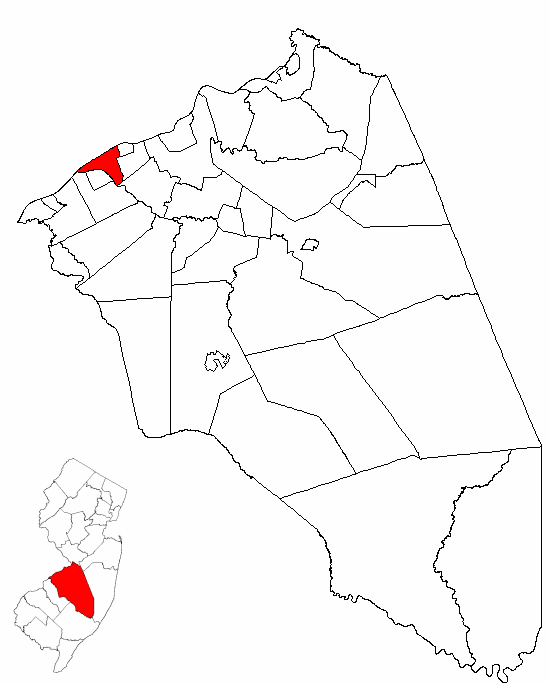
- Location of Delanco Township in Burlington County highlighted in red (right). Inset map: Location of Burlington County in New Jersey highlighted in red (left).

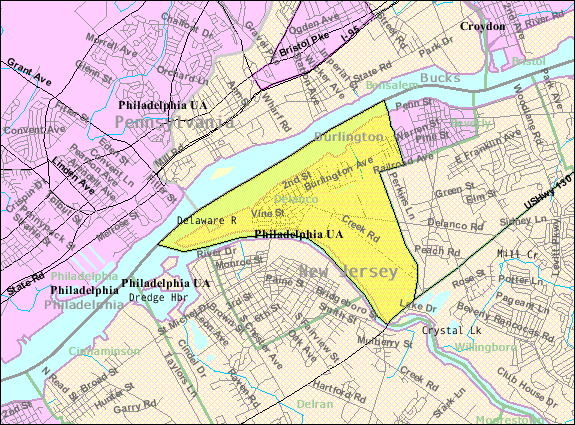
- Census Bureau map of Delanco Township, New Jersey

- Location in Burlington County Location in New Jersey Location in the United States
- Coordinates: 40.050631°N 74.937815°W
- Country: United States
- State: New Jersey
- County: Burlington
- Incorporated: March 1, 1859 as Beverly Township
- Renamed: December 20, 1926 as Delanco Township
- Named for: DELaware River and RANCOcas Creek

Government
  - Type: Township
  - Body: Township Committee
  - Mayor: Kate Fitzpatrick (R, term ends December 31, 2026)
  - Administrator: Debra Ciminera
  - Municipal clerk: Janice M. Lohr

Area
  - Total: 3.33 sq mi (8.62 km^{2})
  - Land: 2.36 sq mi (6.11 km^{2})
  - Water: 0.97 sq mi (2.52 km^{2}) 29.19%
  - Rank: 322nd of 565 in state 29th of 40 in county
- Elevation: 20 ft (6.1 m)

Population (2020)
  - Total: 4,824
  - Estimate (2023): 4,897
  - Rank: 384th of 565 in state 29th of 40 in county
  - Density: 2,046.1/sq mi (790.0/km^{2})
  - Rank: 293rd of 565 in state 16th of 40 in county
- Time zone: UTC−05:00 (Eastern (EST))
  - Summer (DST): UTC−04:00 (Eastern (EDT))
- ZIP Code: 08075
- Area code: 856 exchanges: 461, 764, 824
- FIPS code: 3400517080
- GNIS feature ID: 0882100
- Website: www.delancotownship.com

Delanco Township is a township in Burlington County, in the U.S. state of New Jersey. As of the 2020 United States census, the township's population was 4,824, an increase of 541 (+12.6%) from the 2010 census count of 4,283, which in turn reflected an increase of 1,046 (+32.3%) from the 3,237 counted in the 2000 census. The township, and all of Burlington County, is a part of the Philadelphia metropolitan area.

Delanco was named for the Delaware River and Rancocas Creek, which border the community. It was originally called Del-Ranco or Delaranco, a syllabic abbreviation later shortened to Delanco.

It is a dry township where alcohol cannot be sold.

== History ==
What is now Delanco Township was originally incorporated as Beverly Township by an act of the New Jersey Legislature on March 1, 1859, within Willingboro Township. Delanco was a geographical place name by 1868, and probably earlier. At its creation, Beverly Township included Beverly city, which separated as an independent municipality c. 1877. Portions of the township were taken to create Edgewater Park on February 26, 1924. The township's name was changed to Delanco Township as of December 20, 1926, based on the results of a referendum held on November 2, 1926.

In April 1861, the Sixth Massachusetts Militia passed through Delanco, on their way to Washington to defend the federal capital. According to the report of Colonel Edward F. Jones during their travel, James Brady was "taken insane" and left in Delanco Township with J. C. Buck. When the regiment arrived in Baltimore, Maryland, it was attacked during the Baltimore riot of 1861.

== Geography ==
According to the United States Census Bureau, the township had a total area of 3.33 square miles (8.62 km^{2}), including 2.36 square miles (6.11 km^{2}) of land and 0.97 square miles (2.52 km^{2}) of water (29.19%).

The township borders the municipalities of Beverly, Delran Township, Edgewater Park Township, Riverside Township, Willingboro Township in Burlington County; and also borders Bensalem Township and the city of Philadelphia in Pennsylvania, across the Delaware River.

== Demographics ==
Historical population
Census	Pop.	Note	%±
1860	906		—
1870	1,020		12.6%
1880	1,369	*	34.2%
1890	1,451		6.0%
1900	1,801		24.1%
1910	2,337		29.8%
1920	2,794		19.6%
1930	2,349	*	−15.9%
1940	2,383		1.4%
1950	2,805		17.7%
1960	4,011		43.0%
1970	4,157		3.6%
1980	3,730		−10.3%
1990	3,316		−11.1%
2000	3,237		−2.4%
2010	4,283		32.3%
2020	4,824		12.6%
2023 (est.)	4,897		1.5%
Population sources: 1860–2000 1860–1920; 1860–1870 1870 1880–1890; 1890–1910 1910–1930; 1940–2000 2000; 2010 2020 * = Lost territory in previous decade.

=== 2010 census ===
The 2010 United States census counted 4,283 people, 1,755 households, and 1,241 families in the township. The population density was 1,817.9 per square mile (701.9/km^{2}). There were 1,853 housing units at an average density of 786.5 per square mile (303.7/km^{2}). The racial makeup was 82.79% (3,546) White, 10.97% (470) Black or African American, 0.47% (20) Native American, 1.87% (80) Asian, 0.12% (5) Pacific Islander, 0.93% (40) from other races, and 2.85% (122) from two or more races. Hispanic or Latino of any race were 3.55% (152) of the population.

Of the 1,755 households, 26.2% had children under the age of 18; 52.0% were married couples living together; 13.7% had a female householder with no husband present and 29.3% were non-families. Of all households, 23.2% were made up of individuals and 7.3% had someone living alone who was 65 years of age or older. The average household size was 2.44 and the average family size was 2.87.

19.7% of the population were under the age of 18, 7.3% from 18 to 24, 26.3% from 25 to 44, 30.6% from 45 to 64, and 16.1% who were 65 years of age or older. The median age was 42.4 years. For every 100 females, the population had 94.8 males. For every 100 females ages 18 and older there were 91.3 males.

The Census Bureau's 2006–2010 American Community Survey showed that (in 2010 inflation-adjusted dollars) median household income was $77,357 (with a margin of error of +/− $9,985) and the median family income was $82,368 (+/− $9,070). Males had a median income of $56,333 (+/− $12,752) versus $46,625 (+/− $9,993) for females. The per capita income for the borough was $33,943 (+/− $4,082). About 1.5% of families and 4.3% of the population were below the poverty line, including none of those under age 18 and 1.9% of those age 65 or over.

=== 2000 census ===
As of the 2000 United States census there were 3,237 people, 1,227 households, and 892 families residing in the township. The population density was 1,301.1 inhabitants per square mile (502.4/km^{2}). There were 1,285 housing units at an average density of 516.5 per square mile (199.4/km^{2}). The racial makeup of the township was 95.89% White, 1.92% African American, 0.25% Native American, 0.40% Asian, 0.40% from other races, and 1.14% from two or more races. Hispanic or Latino of any race were 1.95% of the population.

There were 1,227 households, out of which 33.2% had children under the age of 18 living with them, 54.4% were married couples living together, 13.7% had a female householder with no husband present, and 27.3% were non-families. 22.8% of all households were made up of individuals, and 9.5% had someone living alone who was 65 years of age or older. The average household size was 2.64 and the average family size was 3.09.

In the township the population was spread out, with 24.9% under the age of 18, 7.3% from 18 to 24, 32.5% from 25 to 44, 22.1% from 45 to 64, and 13.3% who were 65 years of age or older. The median age was 37 years. For every 100 females, there were 93.9 males. For every 100 females age 18 and over, there were 92.7 males.

The median income for a household in the township was $50,106, and the median income for a family was $56,985. Males had a median income of $40,727 versus $28,144 for females. The per capita income for the township was $21,096. About 6.8% of families and 9.5% of the population were below the poverty line, including 13.6% of those under age 18 and 10.0% of those age 65 or over.

== Government ==
=== Local government ===
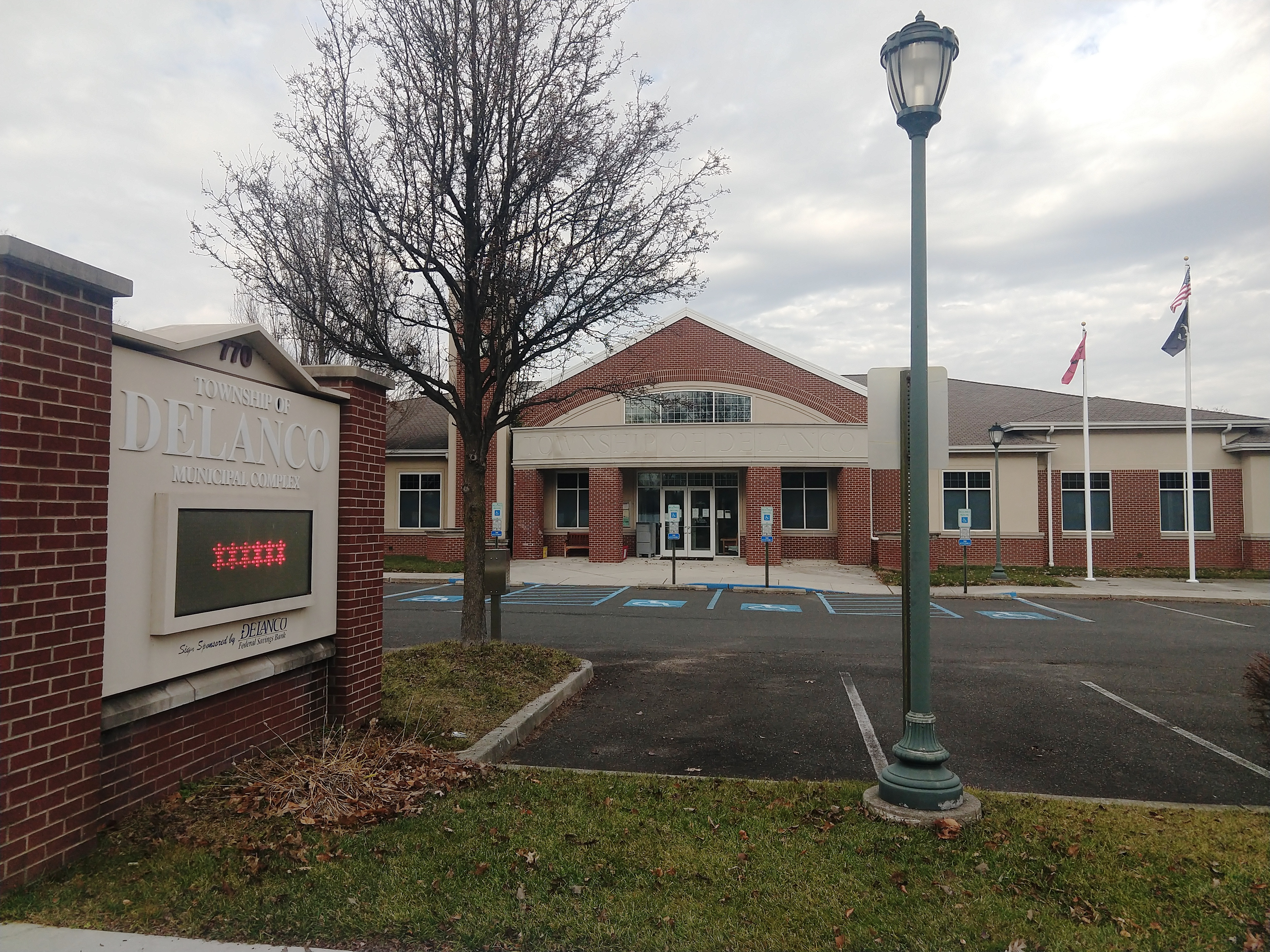
Delanco Township municipal building

Delanco Township is governed under the Township form of government, one of 141 municipalities (of the 564) statewide that use this form. The Township Committee is the township's governing body and is responsible for formulating policies, approving the annual budget and enacting ordinances and resolutions to provide a legislative framework. Voters approved a measure in 2000 that expanded the Township Committee from three to five members starting in 2002. The Township Committee is comprised of five members who are elected directly by the voters at-large in partisan elections to serve three-year terms of office on a staggered basis, with either one or two seats coming up for election each year as part of the November general election in a three-year cycle. At an annual reorganization meeting, the Township Committee selects one of its members to serve as Mayor and another as Deputy Mayor.

As of 2025, members of the Delanco Township Committee are Mayor Carolyn Suess (R, term on committee ends December 31, 2025; term as mayor ends 2025), Deputy Mayor Kate Fitzpatrick (R, term on committee ends 2025; term as deputy mayor ends 2025), Fernand C. Ouelette (D, 2026), M. Scott Bartlett (R, 2027), and Phillip McFadden (R, 2027).

Delanco's Chief of Police is Basil Warren II. Delanco Township's Administrator is Debra Ciminera. The Township Clerk and Assistant Administrator is Janice Lohr, RMC. The Deputy Municipal Clerk is Beverly Russell, RMC.

=== Federal, state and county representation ===
Delanco Township is located in the 3rd Congressional District and is part of New Jersey's 7th state legislative district.

For the 119th United States Congress, New Jersey's 3rd congressional district is currently represented Herb Conaway (D, Delran Township). New Jersey is represented in the United States Senate by Democrats Cory Booker (Newark, term ends 2027) and Andy Kim (Moorestown, term ends 2031).

For the 2026–2027 session, the 7th legislative district of the New Jersey Legislature is represented in the State Senate by Troy Singleton (D, Palmyra) and in the General Assembly by Carol A. Murphy (D, Mount Laurel) and Balvir Singh (D, Burlington Township).

Burlington County is governed by a Board of County Commissioners comprised of five members who are chosen at-large in partisan elections to serve three-year terms of office on a staggered basis, with either one or two seats coming up for election each year; at an annual reorganization meeting, the board selects a director and deputy director from among its members to serve a one-year term. As of 2026, Burlington County's Commissioners are: Director Felicia Hopson (D, Willingboro Township, term as commissioner ends December 31, 2027; term as director ends 2026), Deputy Director Allison Eckel (D, Medford, term as commissioner ends 2028; term as deputy director ends 2026), Randy Brolo (D, Lumberton, 2026; elected to an unexpired term), Tyler Burrell (D, Delran Township, 2027) and Tom Pullion (D, Edgewater Park, 2026).

Burlington County's constitutional officers are Clerk Joanne Schwartz (D, Southampton Township, 2028), Sheriff James H. Kostoplis (D, Bordentown, 2028) and Surrogate Brian J. Carlin (D, Burlington Township, 2026).

=== Politics ===
United States presidential election results for Delanco Township 2024 2020 2016 2012 2008 2004
Year	Republican		Democratic		Third party(ies)	
Year	No.	%	No.	%	No.	%
2024	1,106	40.71%	1,577	58.04%	34	1.25%
2020	1,087	38.41%	1,703	60.18%	40	1.41%
2016	1,016	41.47%	1,342	54.78%	92	3.76%
2012	933	39.50%	1,406	59.53%	23	0.97%
2008	967	40.99%	1,374	58.25%	18	0.76%
2004	881	44.07%	1,097	54.88%	21	1.05%

As of March 2011, there were a total of 2,927 registered voters in Delanco Township, of which 1,001 (34.2% vs. 33.3% countywide) were registered as Democrats, 703 (24.0% vs. 23.9%) were registered as Republicans and 1,220 (41.7% vs. 42.8%) were registered as Unaffiliated. There were 3 voters registered as Libertarians or Greens. Among the township's 2010 Census population, 68.3% (vs. 61.7% in Burlington County) were registered to vote, including 85.1% of those ages 18 and over (vs. 80.3% countywide).

In the 2012 presidential election, Democrat Barack Obama received 1,406 votes here (59.2% vs. 58.1% countywide), ahead of Republican Mitt Romney with 933 votes (39.3% vs. 40.2%) and other candidates with 23 votes (1.0% vs. 1.0%), among the 2,375 ballots cast by the township's 3,153 registered voters, for a turnout of 75.3% (vs. 74.5% in Burlington County). In the 2008 presidential election, Democrat Barack Obama received 1,374 votes here (57.7% vs. 58.4% countywide), ahead of Republican John McCain with 967 votes (40.6% vs. 39.9%) and other candidates with 18 votes (0.8% vs. 1.0%), among the 2,382 ballots cast by the township's 2,894 registered voters, for a turnout of 82.3% (vs. 80.0% in Burlington County). In the 2004 presidential election, Democrat John Kerry received 1,097 votes here (54.7% vs. 52.9% countywide), ahead of Republican George W. Bush with 881 votes (43.9% vs. 46.0%) and other candidates with 21 votes (1.0% vs. 0.8%), among the 2,007 ballots cast by the township's 2,509 registered voters, for a turnout of 80.0% (vs. 78.8% in the whole county).

Gubernatorial election results for Delanco Township
Year	Republican		Democratic		Third party(ies)	
Year	No.	%	No.	%	No.	%
2025	809	36.29%	1,406	63.08%	14	0.63%
2021	787	43.67%	1,002	55.60%	13	0.72%
2017	643	42.72%	834	55.42%	28	1.86%
2013	982	62.15%	574	36.33%	24	1.52%
2009	666	43.67%	756	49.57%	103	6.75%
2005	580	42.87%	711	52.55%	62	4.58%

In the 2013 gubernatorial election, Republican Chris Christie received 982 votes here (60.6% vs. 61.4% countywide), ahead of Democrat Barbara Buono with 574 votes (35.4% vs. 35.8%) and other candidates with 24 votes (1.5% vs. 1.2%), among the 1,620 ballots cast by the township's 3,174 registered voters, yielding a 51.0% turnout (vs. 44.5% in the county). In the 2009 gubernatorial election, Democrat Jon Corzine received 756 ballots cast (49.2% vs. 44.5% countywide), ahead of Republican Chris Christie with 666 votes (43.3% vs. 47.7%), Independent Chris Daggett with 78 votes (5.1% vs. 4.8%) and other candidates with 25 votes (1.6% vs. 1.2%), among the 1,537 ballots cast by the township's 2,973 registered voters, yielding a 51.7% turnout (vs. 44.9% in the county).

United States Senate election results for Delanco Township1
Year	Republican		Democratic		Third party(ies)	
Year	No.	%	No.	%	No.	%
2024	926	35.33%	1,645	62.76%	50	1.91%
2018	889	42.17%	1,100	52.18%	119	5.65%
2012	881	39.12%	1,344	59.68%	27	1.20%
2006	563	43.64%	692	53.64%	35	2.71%

United States Senate election results for Delanco Township2
Year	Republican		Democratic		Third party(ies)	
Year	No.	%	No.	%	No.	%
2020	1,074	38.83%	1,635	59.11%	57	2.06%
2014	612	42.44%	801	55.55%	29	2.01%
2013	416	44.35%	502	53.52%	20	2.13%
2008	878	40.69%	1,245	57.69%	35	1.62%

== Education ==
The Delanco Township School District serves public school students in kindergarten through eighth grade. As of the 2021–22 school year, the district, comprised of two schools, had an enrollment of 384 students and 27.4 classroom teachers (on an FTE basis), for a student–teacher ratio of 14.0:1. Schools in the district (with 2021–22 enrollment data from the New Jersey Department of Education) are M. Joan Pearson Elementary School with 218 students in grades K-5 and Walnut Street Middle School with 140 students in grades 6-8.

For ninth through twelfth grades, public school students attend Riverside High School in Riverside Township as part of a sending/receiving relationship with the Riverside School District. As of the 2021–22 school year, the high school had an enrollment of 428 students and 36.8 classroom teachers (on an FTE basis), for a student–teacher ratio of 11.6:1.

Students from Delanco Township, and from all of Burlington County, are eligible to attend the Burlington County Institute of Technology, a countywide public school district that serves the vocational and technical education needs of students at the high school and post-secondary level at its campuses in Medford and Westampton. All costs associated with attending the school are paid by the home school district, which is also responsible for student transportation to and from the school.

== Transportation ==
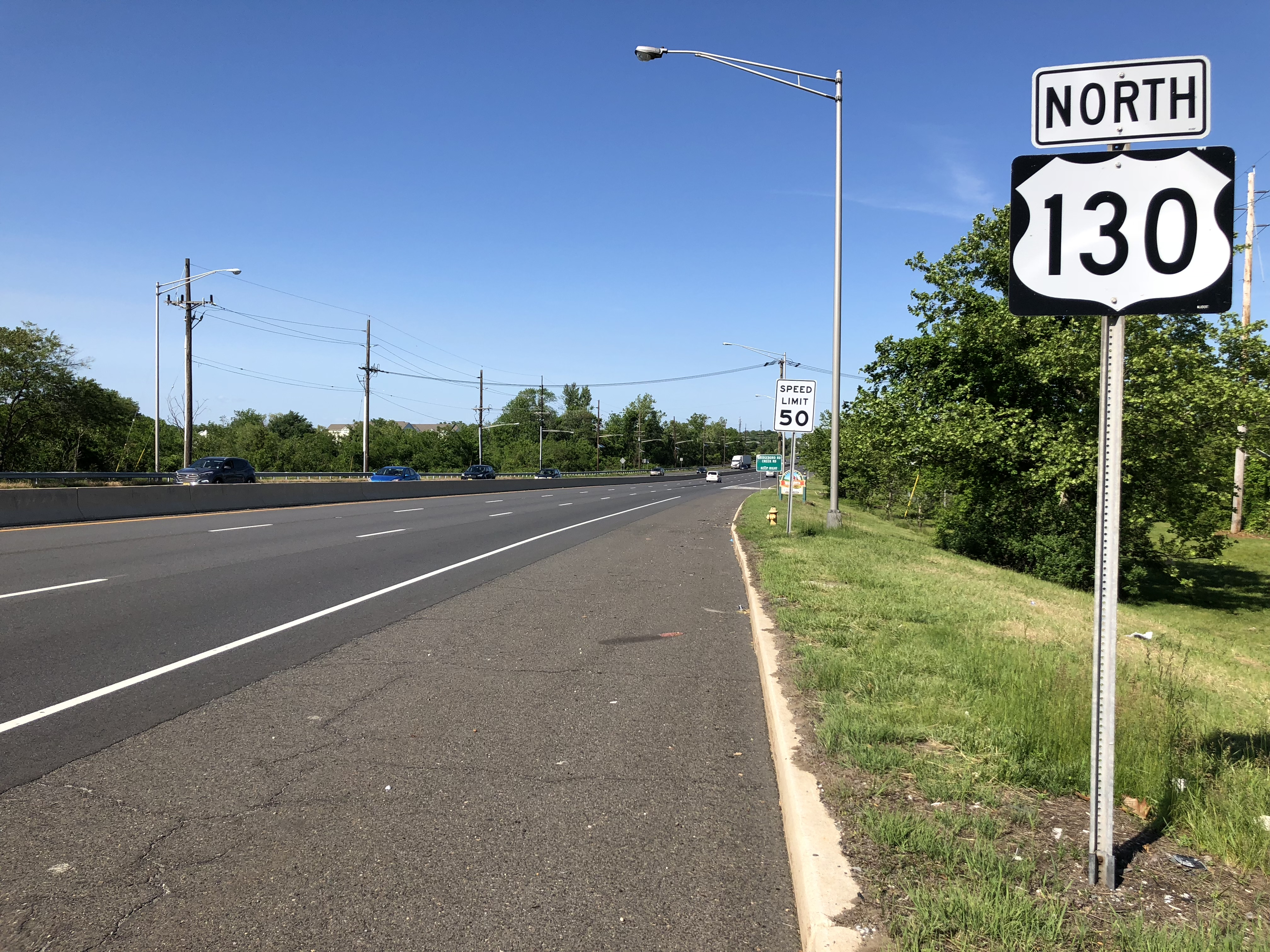
U.S. Route 130 on the southeast edge of Delanco

=== Roads and highways ===
As of May 2010, the township had a total of 18.88 miles (30.38 km) of roadways, of which 14.01 miles (22.55 km) were maintained by the municipality, 4.61 miles (7.42 km) by Burlington County and 0.26 miles (0.42 km) by the New Jersey Department of Transportation.

U.S. Route 130 is the main highway directly serving Delanco Township, forming the township's southeastern border with Willingboro Township. County Route 543 crosses the township close to the Delaware River. Both roads are oriented southwest to northeast parallel to the Delaware River, but are signed north–south.

=== Public transportation ===
The Delanco station is located on Rhawn Street providing access to the River Line light rail system, offering southbound service to Camden's Walter Rand Transportation Center (with transfers available to the PATCO Speedline to Philadelphia) and the Pennsauken Transit Center (with transfers available to NJ Transit trains to Philadelphia and Atlantic City) and northbound service to the Trenton Rail Station with connections to NJ Transit trains to New York City, SEPTA trains to Philadelphia, and Amtrak trains on the Northeast Corridor.

== Notable people ==
People who were born in, residents of, or otherwise closely associated with Delanco Township include:

- Helen Corinne Bergen (1868–?), author, journalist and critic
- Al Bunge (born 1937), former National Basketball Association first round pick (seventh pick overall) of the Philadelphia Warriors in the 1960 NBA draft
- Joe Burk (1914–2008), competitive oarsman and coach
- Herb Conaway (born 1963), physician who served in the New Jersey General Assembly from 1998 to 2025, and in the U.S. House since 2025
- Kenneth William Faulkner (born 1947), former member of the New Jersey General Assembly, who was a teacher, school administrator and basketball coach at Burlington Township High School
- Thomas Fletcher (1787–1866), silversmith
- Samuel C. Forker (1821–1900), represented New Jersey's 2nd congressional district in the United States House of Representatives from 1871 to 1873
- Albert McCay (1901–1969), served in the New Jersey Senate from 1952 to 1960
- Earl Rowe (1920–2002), actor best known for playing Lt. Dave Barton in the 1958 film The Blob

Preceded by Bensalem Township, Pennsylvania; Bucks County	Bordering communities of Philadelphia	Succeeded by Riverside Township
