= Delanco Township School District =

School district in Burlington County, New Jersey, US

Address
- 1301 Burlington Avenue Delanco Township, Burlington County, New Jersey, 08075; United States
- Coordinates: 40.052963°N 74.948123°W

District information
- Grades: PreK-8
- Superintendent: Ronnie Tarchichi
- Business administrator: Jon Yates
- Schools: 1

Students and staff
- Enrollment: 370 (as of 2024–25)
- Faculty: 29.6 FTEs
- Student–teacher ratio: 12.5:1

Other information
- District Factor Group: CD
- Website: www.delanco.com
Ind.	Per pupil	District spending	Rank (*)	K-8 average	%± vs. average
1A	Total Spending	$17,438	21	$18,891	−7.7%
1	Budgetary Cost	14,767	32	14,159	4.3%
2	Classroom Instruction	8,196	22	8,659	−5.3%
6	Support Services	2,588	40	2,167	19.4%
8	Administrative Cost	1,555	28	1,547	0.5%
10	Operations & Maintenance	2,225	52	1,612	38.0%
13	Extracurricular Activities	118	28	104	13.5%
16	Median Teacher Salary	53,764	18	61,136
Data from NJDoE 2014 Taxpayers' Guide to Education Spending. *Of K-8 districts with up to 400 students. Lowest spending=1; Highest=71

The Delanco Township School District is a community public school district that serves students in pre-kindergarten through eighth grade from Delanco Township, in Burlington County, in the U.S. state of New Jersey.

As of the 2024–25 school year, the district, comprised of one school, had an enrollment of 370 students and 29.6 classroom teachers (on an FTE basis), for a student–teacher ratio of 12.5:1.

Starting with the 2024–25 school year, Walnut Street School has been closed and all district students attend M. Joan Pearson Elementary School.

The district had been classified by the New Jersey Department of Education as being in District Factor Group "CD", the sixth-highest of eight groupings. District Factor Groups organize districts statewide to allow comparison by common socioeconomic characteristics of the local districts. From lowest socioeconomic status to highest, the categories are A, B, CD, DE, FG, GH, I and J.

For ninth through twelfth grades, public school students attend Riverside High School in Riverside Township as part of a sending/receiving relationship with the Riverside School District. As of the 2024–25 school year, the high school had an enrollment of 464 students and 44.8 classroom teachers (on an FTE basis), for a student–teacher ratio of 10.4:1.

== Schools ==
Schools in the district (with 2024–25 enrollment data from the New Jersey Department of Education) are:

Elementary school

- M. Joan Pearson Elementary School with 355 students in grades PreK-8
  - Ronnie Tarchichi, principal

Middle school

- Walnut Street Middle School

== Administration ==
Core members of the district's administration are:

- Ronnie Tarchichi, superintendent
- Jon Yates, business administrator and board secretary

== Board of education ==
The district's board of education, comprised of nine members, sets policy and oversees the fiscal and educational operation of the district through its administration. As a Type II school district, the board's trustees are elected directly by voters to serve three-year terms of office on a staggered basis, with three seats up for election each year held (since 2012) as part of the November general election. The board appoints a superintendent to oversee the district's day-to-day operations and a business administrator to supervise the business functions of the district.
