= Earl Rowe (actor) =

American actor (1920-2002)

- Rowe in The Blob (1958)
- Born: Earl Eugene Rowe; August 21, 1920; Delanco Township, New Jersey, U.S.
- Died: February 1, 2002 (aged 81); Moorestown, New Jersey, U.S.
- Occupation: Actor
- Years active: 1951–1958; 1973–1985

Earl Eugene Rowe (August 21, 1920 – February 1, 2002) was an American film, stage and television actor. He was best known for playing Lt. Dave Barton in the 1958 film The Blob.

== Life and career ==
Rowe was born in Delanco Township, New Jersey. Raised in Riverside Township, New Jersey, he attended Palmyra High School, graduating in 1938; his lead role in a school performance of Death Takes a Holiday led a teacher to tell him that he should pursue a career as an actor. After graduating, he attended Bessie V. Hicks School of Dramatic Arts in Philadelphia, Pennsylvania. He acted on summer stock theaters, and served in the United States Army during World War II. He began his screen career in 1951, appearing in the CBS anthology television series Studio One, and in 1952, he appeared in Lux Video Theatre.

Later in his career, Rowe guest-starred in television programs including The Phil Silvers Show, Naked City, Kojak, and played the recurring role of Evan Fleming in the NBC soap opera television series The Doctors. In 1958, he starred as Lt. Dave Barton in the film The Blob, starring along with Steve McQueen, Aneta Corsaut and Olin Howland, and in 1980, he appeared in the television film Attica.

Rowe retired from acting in 1985, last appearing in the CBS soap opera television series As the World Turns.

== Death ==
Rowe died from complications of Parkinson's disease on February 1, 2002 in Moorestown, New Jersey, at the age of 81.
