= Cavalcade of Bands =

US competitive band organization

- Abbreviation: CoB, CMB
- Established: 1958; 68 years ago
- Founder: Arlen R. Saylor
- Type: Performing arts organization
- Tax ID no.: 23-3068775
- Legal status: 501(c)(3) organization
- Region served: Mid-Atlantic, U.S.
- Members: 94 bands (2025)
- President: Adam Nobile (Big Spring HS)
- CEO: Justin McAdams
- Judging Coordinator: John Keane
- Parent organization: Cavalcade of Bands Association, Inc.
- Revenue: ▼US$189,000 (2024)
- Expenses: ▼US$177,000 (2024)
- Website: cavalcadeofbands.com

The Cavalcade of Bands is one of many competitive band organizations in the United States and is one of several major circuits in the mid-Atlantic states (other circuits include Tournament of Bands and USBands). Cavalcade was founded in the late 1958 by the members of the Mid-Atlantic Judges Association (MAJA) and its member high schools. The organization currently has 150 member bands. It provides competitive performance opportunities for marching bands and jazz ensembles. Cavalcade sanctions approximately 50 field band events as well as about 25 jazz ensemble events annually.

From 1971 to 2020, Cavalcade sanctioned color guard, percussion ensemble, and dance team competitions via the Cavalcade Indoor Drill Association (CIDA), later the Cavalcade Indoor Association (CIA).

== Marching band ==
The first Cavalcade of Bands Championships were hosted in 1970 at the Farm Show Arena in Harrisburg, Pennsylvania. Prior to 1970, members would designate a competition in October or November as the de facto championship event, but not all member bands would attend. Champions from 1959 to 1969 were included in lists of Open Class Champions after 1970.

From September to mid-November, Cavalcade sanctions as many as 50 high school marching band competitions throughout the Mid-Atlantic. Bands are aligned into four to five divisions, frequently called classes, based on the number of performing members in each band:

Division	Members
Independence	Up to 35 members
American	35–50 members
Liberty	51–70 members
Yankee	71–95 members
Patriot	More than 95 members

During championships, member bands are sorted into two broad classes, Open or A Class, based on each band's performance history during the season. Each broad class is then further divided based on number of members. A Class was created in 1996 for bands "new to the competitive arena, limited access to the resources, or are in a growing/rebuilding phase of their program."

On January 1, 2019, the Cavalcade of Bands Honor Band performed in the Rose Parade in Pasadena, California. The band included over 100 students from 20 high schools in the Mid-Atlantic region.

== Indoor activities ==
Cavalcade of Bands has discontinued indoor activities (winter guard, dance, percussion ensemble and indoor marching bands) in 2019. Prior to the COB's reorganization the early 2000s, the indoor season was organized by the independent Cavalcade Indoor Drill Association (CIDA), later known as Cavalcade Indoor (CIA).

== Past champions ==
=== Open Class (1959–present) ===
Year	—	—	—	Yankee	—
1959 (—)				Boyertown ^{(1)}	
1960 (—)				Wilson Boro ^{(1)}	
1961 (—)				Lebanon	
1962 (—)				Wilson Boro ^{(2)}	
1963 (—)				Boyertown ^{(2)}	
1964 (—)				Boyertown ^{(3)}	
1965 (—)				Wilson ^{(1)}	
1966 (—)				Wilson ^{(2)}	
1967 (—)				Wilson ^{(3)}	
1968 (—)				Wilson ^{(4)}	
1969 (—)				Wilson ^{(5)}	
Year	—	American	—	Yankee	—
1970 (1st)		Salisbury ^{(1)}		Wilson ^{(6)}	
1971 (2nd)		Plymouth Whitemarsh ^{(1)}		Wilson ^{(7)}	
1972 (3rd)		Salisbury ^{(2)}		Wilson ^{(8)}	
Year	Independence	American	—	Yankee	—
1973 (4th)	Danville	East Pennsboro		Wilson ^{(9)}	
1974 (5th)	Phoenixville ^{(1)}	CB West		Plymouth Whitemarsh ^{(1)}	
1975 (6th)	Hanover	Hatboro Horsham ^{(1)}		Plymouth Whitemarsh ^{(2)}	
1976 (7th)	Phoenixville ^{(2)}	Shikellamy ^{(1)}		Abington	
1977 (8th)	ELCO	Shikellamy ^{(2)}		Plymouth Whitemarsh ^{(3)}	
Year	Independence	American	Liberty	Yankee	—
1978 (9th)	Upper Merion	Hanover ^{(1)}	Warwick ^{(1)}	Plymouth Whitemarsh ^{(4)}	
1979 (10th)	South Western	Upper Dublin	Shikellamy (tie); Williamsport Area	Plymouth Whitemarsh ^{(5)}	
1980 (11th)	Ephrata	Manheim Township	Cumberland Valley	North Penn ^{(1)}	
1981 (12th)	Downingtown	Wissahickon ^{(1)}	Northern Lebanon	North Penn ^{(2)}	
1982 (13th)	Phoenixville ^{(3)}	Archbishop Ryan	Manhiem Township ^{(1)}	North Penn ^{(3)}	
1983 (14th)	Upper Dublin ^{(1)}	Hanover ^{(2)}	Upper Moreland ^{(1)}	Archbishop Ryan	
1984 (15th)	Upper Dublin ^{(2)}	Lake Lehman ^{(1)}	Manheim Township ^{(2)}	North Penn ^{(4)}	
1985 (16th)	Conrad Weiser	Abington	Downingtown	Shikellamy ^{(1)}	
1986 (17th)	Upper Dublin ^{(3)}	Wissahickon ^{(2)}	Upper Moreland ^{(2)}	North Penn ^{(5)}	
1987 (18th)	Upper Dublin ^{(4)}	Lake Lehman ^{(2)}	Upper Moreland ^{(3)}	North Penn ^{(6)}	
1988 (19th)	Upper Dublin ^{(5)}	Hatboro Horsham ^{(2)}	Spring Grove	North Penn ^{(7)}	
1989 (20th)	Upper Dublin ^{(6)}	Upper Moreland ^{(1)}	Manheim Township ^{(3)}	North Penn ^{(8)}	
1990 (21st)	Archbishop Wood ^{(1)}	Spring Grove ^{(1)}	Hatboro Horsham ^{(1)}	North Penn ^{(9)}	
1991 (22nd)	Archbishop Wood ^{(2)}	Penn Manor ^{(1)}	Manheim Township ^{(4)}	Shikellamy ^{(2)}	
1992 (23rd)	Upper Dublin ^{(7)}	South Western ^{(1)}	Manheim Township ^{(5)}	North Penn ^{(10)}	
1993 (24th)	Upper Dublin ^{(8)}	Penn Manor ^{(2)}	Hatboro Horsham ^{(2)}	North Penn ^{(11)}	
1994 (25th)	Upper Dublin ^{(9)}	South Western ^{(2)}	Manheim Township ^{(6)}	North Penn ^{(12)}	
1995 (26th)	Upper Dublin ^{(10)}	Reading	Manheim Township ^{(7)}	Downington	
Year	Independence	American	—	Yankee	—
1996 (27th)	Methacton	Hatboro Horsham ^{(3)}		North Penn ^{(13)}	
1997 (28th)	Lancaster Catholic	Upper Moreland ^{(2)}		Hatboro Horsham	
1998 (29th)	Plymouth Whitemarsh	Penn Manor ^{(3)}		Lampeter Strasburg ^{(1)}	
1999 (30th)	Upper Dublin ^{(11)}	Spring Grove ^{(2)}		Lampeter Strasburg ^{(2)}	
2000 (31st)	Bishop McDevitt ^{(1)}	Lancaster Catholic		South Western ^{(1)}	
2001 (32nd)	Lebanon	South Western ^{(3)}		Manheim Township ^{(1)}	
2002 (33rd)	Bishop McDevitt ^{(2)}	Phoenixville ^{(1)}		Manheim Township ^{(2)}	
Year	Independence	American	Liberty	Yankee	—
2003 (34th)	Lakewood	Phoenixville ^{(2)}	Hatboro Horsham ^{(3)}	Reading	
2004 (35th)	Cinnaminson ^{(1)}	Phoenixville ^{(3)}	Burlington City	Spring Grove	
2005 (36th)	Greencastle-Antrim	Kingsway Regional	Oakcrest	South Western ^{(2)}	
2006 (37th)	Penns Grove	Hatboro Horsham ^{(4)}	Warwick ^{(2)}	South Western ^{(3)}	
2007 (38th)	Henderson	Susquehannock ^{(1)}	Warwick ^{(3)}	Manheim Township ^{(3)}	
2008 (39th)	Pittston ^{(1)}	Hatboro Horsham ^{(5)}	Warwick ^{(4)}	Spring-Ford ^{(1)}	
2009 (40th)	Pittston ^{(2)}	Hatboro Horsham ^{(6)}	New Oxford ^{(1)}	Spring-Ford ^{(2)}	
2010 (41st)	Pittston ^{(3)}	Greencastle-Antrim	Southern Regional ^{(1)}	Spring-Ford ^{(3)}	
2011 (42nd)	Pittston ^{(4)}	Haverford	Southern Regional ^{(2)}	Upper Darby ^{(1)}	
2012 (43rd)	E. Stroudsburg North ^{(1)}	Susquehanna Township	Hatboro Horsham ^{(4)}	Upper Darby ^{(2)}	
2013 (44th)	E. Stroudsburg North ^{(2)}	Plymouth Whitemarsh ^{(2)}	Hatboro Horsham ^{(5)}	Spring-Ford ^{(4)}	
Year	Independence	American	Liberty	Yankee	Patriot
2014 (45th)	Pittston ^{(5)}	East Pennsboro	New Oxford ^{(2)}	Marple Newtown ^{(1)}	Spring-Ford ^{(1)}
2015 (46th)	Blue Mountain	Sun Valley ^{(1)}	Hatboro Horsham ^{(6)}	Marple Newtown ^{(2)}	Upper Moreland ^{(1)}
2016 (47th)	Littlestown	Sun Valley ^{(2)}	Susquehannock ^{(1)}	Marple Newtown ^{(3)}	Spring-Ford ^{(2)}
2017 (48th)	E. Stroudsburg North ^{(3)}	Whitehall ^{(1)}	Susquehannock ^{(2)}	Hempfield ^{(1)}	Spring-Ford ^{(3)}
2018 (49th)	Cinnaminson ^{(2)}	Whitehall ^{(2)}	Susquehannock ^{(3)}	Hempfield ^{(2)}	Spring-Ford ^{(4)}
2019 (50th)	Cinnaminson ^{(3)}	Whitehall ^{(3)}	Camp Hill	Hempfield ^{(3)}	Nazareth Area ^{(1)}
2020^{1} (—)	No champions (Note: The 2020 outdoor marching band season was canceled due to the COVID-19 pandemic)				
2021 (51st)	Whitehall	Susquehannock ^{(2)}	Phoenixville	Nazareth Area ^{(1)}	Spring-Ford ^{(5)}
2022 (52nd)	Haddon Heights	Williamsport Area ^{(1)}	Susquehannock ^{(4)}	Warwick	Nazareth Area ^{(2)}
2023 (53rd)	Biglerville	Sun Valley ^{(3)}	Susquehannock ^{(5)}	Nazareth Area ^{(2)}	Upper Moreland ^{(2)}
2024 (54th)	Donegal ^{(1)}	Williamsport Area ^{(2)}	Susquehannock ^{(6)}	Nazareth Area ^{(3)}	Hempfield
2025 (55th)	Donegal ^{(2)}	Pottsgrove	Susquehannock ^{(7)}	Nazareth Area ^{(4)}	No champion

=== A Class (1996–present) ===
Year	Independence	American	—	Yankee	—
1996 (27th)	No champions	South Western ^{(1)}		No champions	
1997 (28th)	No champions	West Chester EAST		York Suburban ^{(1)} (tie); Hempfield ^{(1)}	
1998 (29th)	No champions	No champions		Hempfield ^{(2)}	
1999 (30th)	No champions	No champions		York Suburban ^{(2)}	
2000 (31st)	Lebanon Catholic ^{(1)}	No champions		No champions	
2001 (32nd)	Phoenixville	Conestoga Valley		No champions	
2002 (33rd)	Lebanon Catholic ^{(2)}	Burlington City		Marple Newtown	
Year	Independence	American	Liberty	Yankee	—
2003 (34th)	Pitman	Oakcrest	West Chester EAST	South Western ^{(1)}	
2004 (35th)	Upper Dauphin	Wissahickon	Coatesville	OJ Roberts ^{(1)}	
2005 (36th)	ChiChester	Lenape	Burlington City	Boyertown	
2006 (37th)	Pottsgrove	Annville Cleona	Conestoga Valley	Hempfield ^{(3)}	
2007 (38th)	Bermudian Springs ^{(1)}	William Penn	Archbishop Wood	Coatesville ^{(1)}	
2008 (39th)	Upper Perkiomen	Blue Mountain ^{(1)}	Unionville	Red Lion ^{(1)}	
2009 (40th)	Bermudian Springs ^{(2)}	Phoenixville	York Suburban	OJ Roberts ^{(2)}	
2010 (41st)	Crestwood	Blue Mountain ^{(2)}	Manheim Central	Cheltenham	
2011 (42nd)	Archbishop Wood	Rustin	Red Lion	Wilson	
2012 (43rd)	Bermudian Springs ^{(3)}	Pottsgrove ^{(1)}	South Western ^{(1)}	Avon Grove	
2013 (44th)	Northern Lebanon	Blue Mountain ^{(3)}	South Western ^{(2)}	Downingtown West	
Year	Independence	American	Liberty	Yankee	Patriot
2014 (45th)	Sissonville ^{(1)}	Great Valley	South Western ^{(3)}	Upper Dublin	Red Lion ^{(1)}
2015 (46th)	Sissonville ^{(2)}	Northampton ^{(1)}	Daniel Boone	Kennett	Downingtown West
2016 (47th)	Cumberland Regional (tie); Palisades ^{(1)}	Northampton ^{(2)}	Cheltenham	Upper Darby ^{(1)}	Manheim Central
2017 (48th)	Palisades ^{(2)}	Loyalsock Township ^{(1)}	Great Valley	Coatesville ^{(2)}	Downingtown East
2018 (49th)	Dieruff	Shikellamy	Northern York	Upper Darby ^{(2)}	Cumberland Valley
2019 (50th)	York Catholic ^{(1)}	Loyalsock Township ^{(2)}	Washington Township	Red Lion ^{(2)}	Neshaminy
2020^{1} (—)	No champions				
2021 (51st)	Shikellamy (and); York Catholic ^{(2)}	South Western ^{(2)}	Upper Moreland	Red Lion ^{(3)}	Cedar Crest ^{(1)}
2022 (52nd)	Biglerville	Hazleton Area	Eastern York	Pennridge	Cedar Crest ^{(2)}
2023 (53rd)	Donegal	Pottsgrove ^{(2)}	Greencastle-Antrim	South Western ^{(2)}	Red Lion ^{(2)}
2024 (54th)	Plymouth Whitemarsh	Shamokin Area	Bloomsburg	Cumberland Valley	No champion
2025 (54th)	Hatboro-Horsham	Jersey Shore	Big Spring	Cumberland Valley ^{(2)}	No champion
