= Edgewater Park, New Jersey =

Township in Burlington County, New Jersey, US

- Township
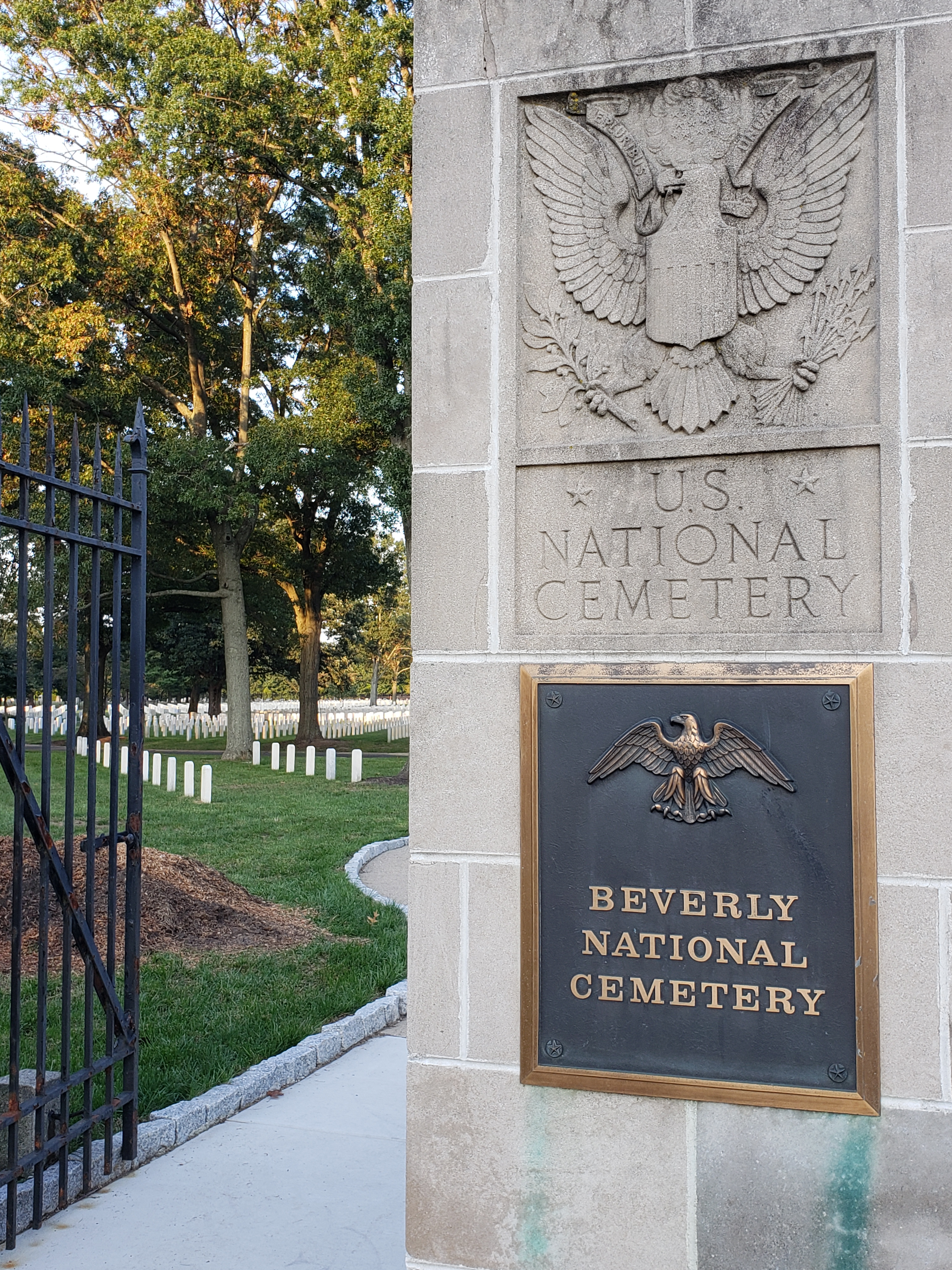
- Beverly National Cemetery, Edgewater Park, New Jersey

- Seal

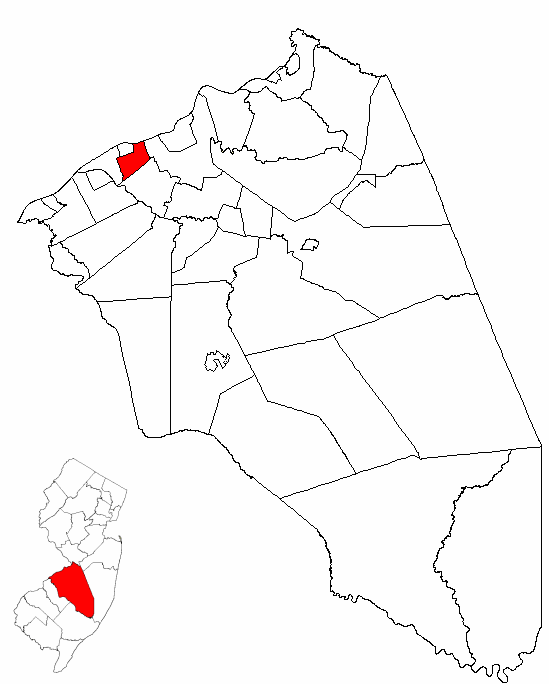
- Location of Edgewater Park in Burlington County highlighted in red (right). Inset map: Location of Burlington County in New Jersey highlighted in red (left).

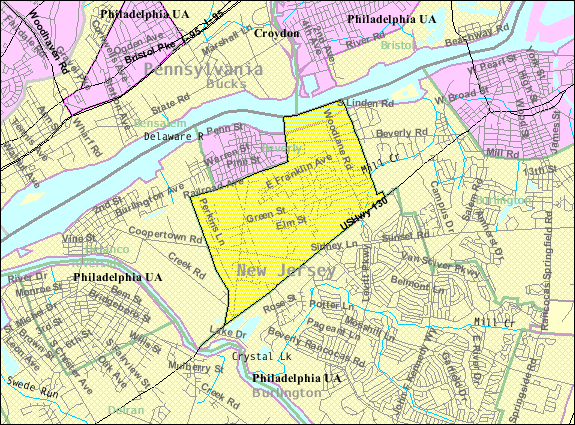
- Census Bureau map of Edgewater Park, New Jersey

- Location in Burlington County Location in New Jersey Location in the United States
- Coordinates: 40.053506°N 74.918438°W
- Country: United States
- State: New Jersey
- County: Burlington
- Incorporated: February 26, 1924

Government
  - Type: Township
  - Body: Township Committee
  - Mayor: Sarah Cannon-Moye (D, term ends December 31, 2026)
  - Administrator: Tom Pullion
  - Municipal clerk: Patricia A. Clayton
  - Police Chief: John B. Harris Jr.

Area
  - Total: 3.08 sq mi (7.97 km^{2})
  - Land: 2.92 sq mi (7.56 km^{2})
  - Water: 0.16 sq mi (0.41 km^{2}) 5.06%
  - Rank: 330th of 565 in state 30th of 40 in county
- Elevation: 33 ft (10 m)

Population (2020)
  - Total: 8,930
  - Estimate (2023): 8,986
  - Rank: 264th of 565 in state 19th of 40 in county
  - Density: 3,059.3/sq mi (1,181.2/km^{2})
  - Rank: 215th of 565 in state 11th of 40 in county
- Time zone: UTC−05:00 (Eastern (EST))
  - Summer (DST): UTC−04:00 (Eastern (EDT))
- ZIP Code: 08010
- Area code: 609
- FIPS code: 3400520050
- GNIS feature ID: 0882101
- Website: www.edgewaterpark-nj.com

Edgewater Park is a township in Burlington County, in the U.S. state of New Jersey and a northeastern suburb of Philadelphia within the Philadelphia metropolitan area. As of the 2020 United States census, the township's population was 8,930, an increase of 49 (+0.6%) from the 2010 census count of 8,881, which in turn reflected an increase of 1,017 (+12.9%) from the 7,864 counted in the 2000 census. The township, and all of Burlington County, is a part of the Philadelphia metropolitan area.

Edgewater Park was incorporated as a township by an act of the New Jersey Legislature on February 26, 1924, from portions of Beverly Township (now known as Delanco Township).} The township was named for its location along the Delaware River.

== Geography ==
According to the United States Census Bureau, the township had a total area of 3.08 square miles (7.97 km^{2}), including 2.92 square miles (7.56 km^{2}) of land and 0.16 square miles (0.41 km^{2}) of water (5.06%).

The township borders the municipalities of Beverly, Burlington Township, Delanco Township and Willingboro Township in Burlington County; and both Bensalem Township and Bristol Township in Pennsylvania, across the Delaware River.

Unincorporated communities, localities and place names located partially or completely within the township include Capitol Hill, Perkins and Wallrope Works.

== Demographics ==
Historical population
Census	Pop.	Note	%±
1930	1,243		—
1940	1,171		−5.8%
1950	1,279		9.2%
1960	2,866		124.1%
1970	7,412		158.6%
1980	9,273		25.1%
1990	8,388		−9.5%
2000	7,864		−6.2%
2010	8,881		12.9%
2020	8,930		0.6%
2023 (est.)	8,986		0.6%
Population sources: 1930–2000 1930; 1940–2000 2000; 2010 2020

=== 2010 census ===
The 2010 United States census counted 8,881 people, 3,683 households, and 2,324 families in the township. The population density was 3,068.8 per square mile (1,184.9/km^{2}). There were 3,926 housing units at an average density of 1,356.6 per square mile (523.8/km^{2}). The racial makeup was 57.71% (5,125) White, 27.32% (2,426) Black or African American, 0.34% (30) Native American, 3.19% (283) Asian, 0.02% (2) Pacific Islander, 6.50% (577) from other races, and 4.93% (438) from two or more races. Hispanic or Latino of any race were 10.92% (970) of the population.

Of the 3,683 households, 24.5% had children under the age of 18; 42.8% were married couples living together; 14.7% had a female householder with no husband present and 36.9% were non-families. Of all households, 30.7% were made up of individuals and 10.6% had someone living alone who was 65 years of age or older. The average household size was 2.41 and the average family size was 3.00.

20.3% of the population were under the age of 18, 8.4% from 18 to 24, 27.6% from 25 to 44, 27.8% from 45 to 64, and 15.8% who were 65 years of age or older. The median age was 40.5 years. For every 100 females, the population had 91.6 males. For every 100 females ages 18 and older there were 87.6 males.

The Census Bureau's 2006–2010 American Community Survey showed that (in 2010 inflation-adjusted dollars) median household income was $53,502 (with a margin of error of +/− $3,682) and the median family income was $68,572 (+/− $15,261). Males had a median income of $45,865 (+/− $6,080) versus $40,400 (+/− $9,192) for females. The per capita income for the township was $26,916 (+/− $2,025). About 9.7% of families and 11.7% of the population were below the poverty line, including 21.2% of those under age 18 and none of those age 65 or over.

=== 2000 census ===
As of the 2000 United States census there were 7,864 people, 3,152 households, and 2,099 families residing in the township. The population density was 2,701.8 inhabitants per square mile (1,043.2/km^{2}). There were 3,301 housing units at an average density of 1,134.1 per square mile (437.9/km^{2}). The racial makeup of the township was 68.07% White, 21.40% African American, 0.17% Native American, 3.26% Asian, 0.01% Pacific Islander, 3.20% from other races, and 3.89% from two or more races. Hispanic or Latino of any race were 6.60% of the population.

As of the 2000 Census, 1.9% of residents identified themselves as being of Turkish American ancestry, the second-highest of any municipality in the United States and highest in the state.

There were 3,152 households, out of which 29.2% had children under the age of 18 living with them, 46.9% were married couples living together, 13.7% had a female householder with no husband present, and 33.4% were non-families. 27.5% of all households were made up of individuals, and 9.6% had someone living alone who was 65 years of age or older. The average household size was 2.49 and the average family size was 3.03.

In the township the population was spread out, with 23.0% under the age of 18, 8.1% from 18 to 24, 30.7% from 25 to 44, 25.2% from 45 to 64, and 13.0% who were 65 years of age or older. The median age was 38 years. For every 100 females, there were 93.0 males. For every 100 females age 18 and over, there were 91.8 males.

The median income for a household in the township was $48,936, and the median income for a family was $52,016. Males had a median income of $38,156 versus $27,304 for females. The per capita income for the township was $22,920. About 7.3% of families and 8.6% of the population were below the poverty line, including 13.9% of those under age 18 and 3.5% of those age 65 or over.

== Government ==
=== Local government ===
Edgewater Park is governed under the Township form of New Jersey municipal government, one of 141 municipalities (of the 564) statewide that use this form, the second-most commonly used form of government in the state. The Township Committee is comprised of five members, who are elected directly by the voters at-large in partisan elections to serve three-year terms of office on a staggered basis, with either one or two seats coming up for election each year as part of the November general election in a three-year cycle. At an annual reorganization meeting, the Township Committee selects one of its members to serve as Mayor and another as Deputy Mayor.

As of 2025, members of the Edgewater Park Township Committee are Mayor Jeff Daloisio (D, term on committee ends December 31, 2027; term as Mayor ends 2025), Deputy Mayor Sarah Cannon-Moye (D, term on committee ends December 31, 2026; term as Deputy Mayor ends 2025), William A. Belgard III (D, 2025), Juanita Scott (D, 2026), Stephen Malecki (D, 2027).

As of 2023, members of the Edgewater Park Township Committee are Mayor Michael J. Trainor (D, term on committee and ends December 31, 2024; term as mayor ends 2023), Deputy Mayor Lauren Kremper DiFilippo (D, term on committee and as deputy mayor ends 2023), William A. Belgard III (D, 2025), Kevin P. Johnson (D, 2024), Juanita A. Scott (D, 2023).

In September 2017, Kevin Johnson was selected from three candidates nominated by the Democratic municipal committee and appointed to fill the seat expiring in December 2018 that became vacant following the death of John G. McElwee the previous month. Johnson served on an interim basis until the November 2017 general election, when he was elected to serve the balance of the term of office.

In January 2017, the Township Committee selected Azunnah C. Amutah from three candidates nominated by the Democratic municipal committee to assume the term expiring in December 2017 that had been held by Barbara Perkins, who resigned from office in December 2016.

Brett V. Evans is the Police Chief of the Edgewater Park Township Police Department.

=== Federal, state and county representation ===
Edgewater Park is located in the 3rd Congressional District and is part of New Jersey's 7th state legislative district.

For the 119th United States Congress, New Jersey's 3rd congressional district is currently represented Herb Conaway (D, Delran Township). New Jersey is represented in the United States Senate by Democrats Cory Booker (Newark, term ends 2027) and Andy Kim (Moorestown, term ends 2031).

For the 2026–2027 session, the 7th legislative district of the New Jersey Legislature is represented in the State Senate by Troy Singleton (D, Palmyra) and in the General Assembly by Carol A. Murphy (D, Mount Laurel) and Balvir Singh (D, Burlington Township).

Burlington County is governed by a Board of County Commissioners comprised of five members who are chosen at-large in partisan elections to serve three-year terms of office on a staggered basis, with either one or two seats coming up for election each year; at an annual reorganization meeting, the board selects a director and deputy director from among its members to serve a one-year term. As of 2026, Burlington County's Commissioners are: Director Felicia Hopson (D, Willingboro Township, term as commissioner ends December 31, 2027; term as director ends 2026), Deputy Director Allison Eckel (D, Medford, term as commissioner ends 2028; term as deputy director ends 2026), Randy Brolo (D, Lumberton, 2026; elected to an unexpired term), Tyler Burrell (D, Delran Township, 2027) and Tom Pullion (D, Edgewater Park, 2026).

Burlington County's constitutional officers are Clerk Joanne Schwartz (D, Southampton Township, 2028), Sheriff James H. Kostoplis (D, Bordentown, 2028) and Surrogate Brian J. Carlin (D, Burlington Township, 2026).

=== Politics ===
United States presidential election results for Edgewater Park 2024 2020 2016 2012 2008 2004
Year	Republican		Democratic		Third party(ies)	
Year	No.	%	No.	%	No.	%
2024	1,188	31.75%	2,516	67.24%	38	1.02%
2020	1,269	30.09%	2,898	68.71%	51	1.21%
2016	1,148	31.70%	2,360	65.18%	113	3.12%
2012	1,083	29.11%	2,596	69.78%	41	1.10%
2008	1,223	30.74%	2,719	68.35%	36	0.90%
2004	1,385	38.23%	2,218	61.22%	20	0.55%

As of March 2011, there were a total of 4,798 registered voters in Edgewater Park Township, of which 2,119 (44.2% vs. 33.3% countywide) were registered as Democrats, 819 (17.1% vs. 23.9%) were registered as Republicans and 1,857 (38.7% vs. 42.8%) were registered as Unaffiliated. There were 3 voters registered as Libertarians or Greens. Among the township's 2010 Census population, 54.0% (vs. 61.7% in Burlington County) were registered to vote, including 67.8% of those ages 18 and over (vs. 80.3% countywide).

In the 2012 presidential election, Democrat Barack Obama received 2,596 votes (69.3% vs. 58.1% countywide), ahead of Republican Mitt Romney with 1,083 votes (28.9% vs. 40.2%) and other candidates with 41 votes (1.1% vs. 1.0%), among the 3,744 ballots cast by the township's 5,007 registered voters, for a turnout of 74.8% (vs. 74.5% in Burlington County). In the 2008 presidential election, Democrat Barack Obama received 2,719 votes (67.8% vs. 58.4% countywide), ahead of Republican John McCain with 1,223 votes (30.5% vs. 39.9%) and other candidates with 36 votes (0.9% vs. 1.0%), among the 4,012 ballots cast by the township's 4,942 registered voters, for a turnout of 81.2% (vs. 80.0% in Burlington County). In the 2004 presidential election, Democrat John Kerry received 2,218 votes (60.9% vs. 52.9% countywide), ahead of Republican George W. Bush with 1,385 votes (38.0% vs. 46.0%) and other candidates with 20 votes (0.5% vs. 0.8%), among the 3,643 ballots cast by the township's 4,680 registered voters, for a turnout of 77.8% (vs. 78.8% in the whole county).

Gubernatorial election results for Edgewater Park
Year	Republican		Democratic		Third party(ies)	
Year	No.	%	No.	%	No.	%
2025	740	25.91%	2,103	73.63%	13	0.46%
2021	763	34.45%	1,441	65.06%	11	0.50%
2017	632	30.68%	1,402	68.06%	26	1.26%
2013	1,189	54.00%	996	45.23%	17	0.77%
2009	871	36.74%	1,363	57.49%	137	5.78%
2005	891	38.11%	1,355	57.96%	92	3.93%

In the 2013 gubernatorial election, Republican Chris Christie received 1,189 votes (53.0% vs. 61.4% countywide), ahead of Democrat Barbara Buono with 996 votes (44.4% vs. 35.8%) and other candidates with 17 votes (0.8% vs. 1.2%), among the 2,244 ballots cast by the township's 5,087 registered voters, yielding a 44.1% turnout (vs. 44.5% in the county). In the 2009 gubernatorial election, Democrat Jon Corzine received 1,363 ballots cast (56.7% vs. 44.5% countywide), ahead of Republican Chris Christie with 871 votes (36.2% vs. 47.7%), Independent Chris Daggett with 115 votes (4.8% vs. 4.8%) and other candidates with 22 votes (0.9% vs. 1.2%), among the 2,403 ballots cast by the township's 4,940 registered voters, yielding a 48.6% turnout (vs. 44.9% in the county).

United States Senate election results for Edgewater Park1
Year	Republican		Democratic		Third party(ies)	
Year	No.	%	No.	%	No.	%
2024	967	26.94%	2,539	70.74%	83	2.31%
2018	992	32.24%	1,899	61.72%	186	6.04%
2012	1,035	29.30%	2,472	69.97%	26	0.74%
2006	837	38.20%	1,310	59.79%	44	2.01%

United States Senate election results for Edgewater Park2
Year	Republican		Democratic		Third party(ies)	
Year	No.	%	No.	%	No.	%
2020	1,145	27.83%	2,916	70.86%	54	1.31%
2014	717	31.57%	1,532	67.46%	22	0.97%
2013	447	31.57%	960	67.80%	9	0.64%
2008	1,107	30.45%	2,483	68.29%	46	1.27%

== Education ==
The Edgewater Park School District serves public school students in grades from pre-kindergarten through eighth grade. As of the 2023–24 school year, the district, comprised of two schools, had an enrollment of 1,015 students and 84.0 classroom teachers (on an FTE basis), for a student–teacher ratio of 12.1:1. Schools in the district (with 2023–24 enrollment data from the National Center for Education Statistics) are Mildred Magowan Elementary School with 563 students in grades PreK–4 and Samuel M. Ridgway Middle School with 416 students in grades 5–8.

For ninth through twelfth grades, public school students attend Burlington City High School in Burlington, as part of a sending/receiving relationship with the City of Burlington Public School District that has existed since the 1930s, in which Edgewater Park students account for almost a third of the high school's enrollment. As of the 2023–24 school year, the high school had an enrollment of 805 students and 74.8 classroom teachers (on an FTE basis), for a student–teacher ratio of 10.8:1.

Students from Edgewater Park, and from all of Burlington County, are eligible to attend the Burlington County Institute of Technology, a countywide public school district that serves the vocational and technical education needs of students at the high school and post-secondary level at its campuses in Medford and Westampton.

== Transportation ==
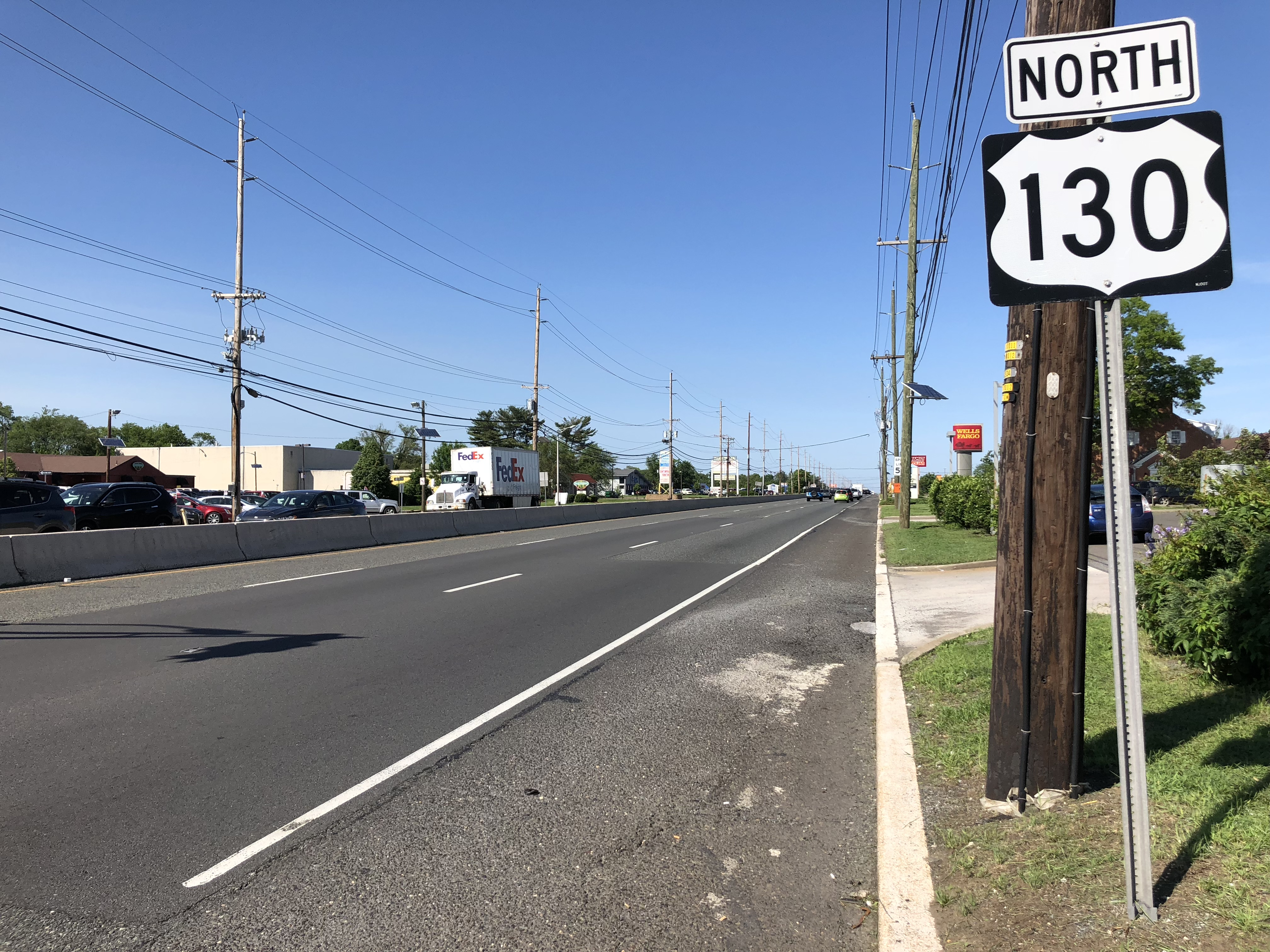
U.S. Route 130 on the southeast edge of Edgewater Park

=== Roads and highways ===
As of May 2010, the township had a total of 28.76 miles (46.28 km) of roadways, of which 22.69 miles (36.52 km) were maintained by the municipality, 4.80 miles (7.72 km) by Burlington County and 1.27 miles (2.04 km) by the New Jersey Department of Transportation.

U.S. Route 130 is the main highway serving Edgewater Park, running along the southeastern edge of the township, forming its border with neighboring Willingboro Township. County Route 543 also passes through the township close to the Delaware River. Both roads are oriented southwest to northeast parallel to the river, but are signed north–south.

=== Public transportation ===
NJ Transit provides bus service on the 409 route between Trenton and Philadelphia, and on the 419 route between Camden and Burlington.

The Beverly/Edgewater Park station provides service between the Trenton Transit Center in Trenton and the Walter Rand Transportation Center (and other stops) in Camden on NJ Transit's River Line light rail system.

BurLink bus service is offered on the B2 route between Beverly and Westampton.

== Notable people ==
People who were born in, residents of, or otherwise closely associated with Edgewater Park include:

- Diane Allen (born 1948), former television anchor who served in the New Jersey Senate from 1998 to 2018
- Aimee Belgard (born 1974), New Jersey Superior Court judge who served on the Burlington County Board of Chosen Freeholders and on the Edgewater Park Township Committee
- Samuel C. Forker (1821–1900), Congressman who represented New Jersey's 2nd congressional district from 1871 to 1873
- Anthony Giacchino (born 1970), filmmaker and composer
- Michael Giacchino (born 1967), soundtrack composer
- Edward Burd Grubb Jr. (1841–1913), Civil War General and United States Ambassador to Spain
- Carla Katz (born 1959), attorney who served as president of Local 1034 of the Communications Workers of America from 1999 until 2008, and received public notice for her relationship with Jon Corzine, both before and during his term as Governor of New Jersey
- Grover C. Richman Jr. (1911–1983), lawyer who served as U.S. Attorney for the District of New Jersey from 1951 to 1953 and as New Jersey Attorney General from 1954 to 1958
- Barney Schultz (1926–2015), pitcher in Major League Baseball from 1955 to 1965
- Charles B. Yates (1939–2000), politician who served in the New Jersey General Assembly from the 7th Legislative District from 1972 to 1978 and in the New Jersey Senate from 1978 to 1982
