= Riverside Township, New Jersey =

Township in Burlington County, New Jersey, US

- Township
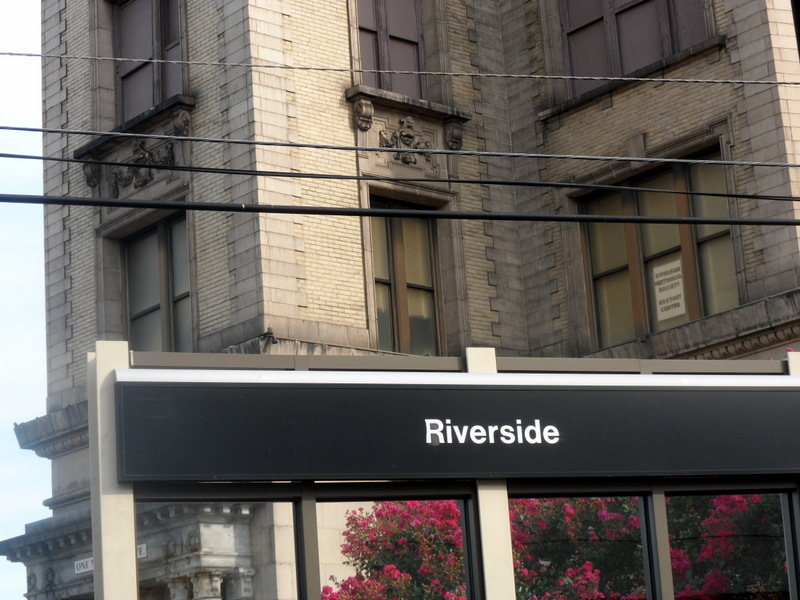
- Riverside Station on the River Line

- Seal

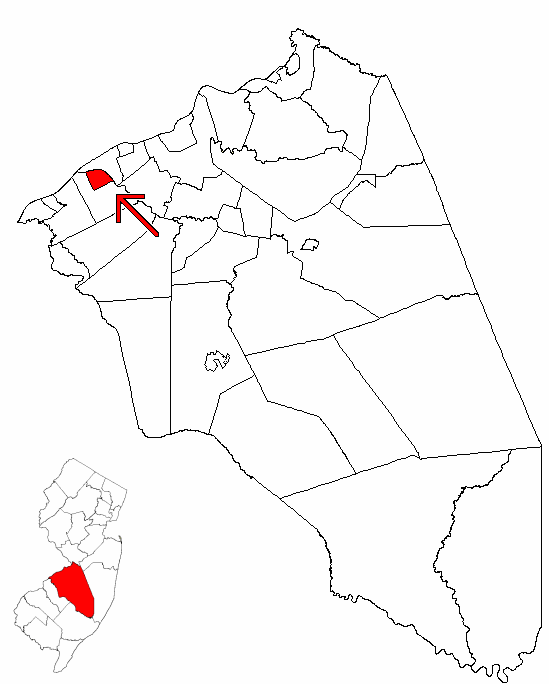
- Location of Riverside Township in Burlington County highlighted in red (right). Inset map: Location of Burlington County in New Jersey highlighted in red (left).

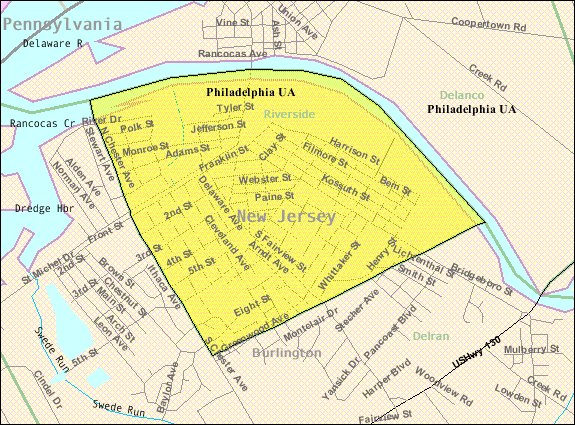
- Census Bureau map of Riverside Township, New Jersey

- Location in Burlington County Location in New Jersey Location in the United States
- Coordinates: 40.035677°N 74.955801°W
- Country: United States
- State: New Jersey
- County: Burlington
- Incorporated: February 20, 1895

Government
  - Type: Township
  - Body: Township Committee
  - Mayor: Michael Higgins (R, term ends December 31, 2023)
  - Administrator: Meghan Jack
  - Municipal clerk: Susan M. Dydek

Area
  - Total: 1.61 sq mi (4.16 km^{2})
  - Land: 1.48 sq mi (3.84 km^{2})
  - Water: 0.12 sq mi (0.32 km^{2}) 7.70%
  - Rank: 440th of 565 in state 34th of 40 in county
- Elevation: 20 ft (6.1 m)

Population (2020)
  - Total: 8,003
  - Estimate (2023): 8,056
  - Rank: 293rd of 565 in state 21st of 40 in county
  - Density: 5,392.9/sq mi (2,082.2/km^{2})
  - Rank: 103rd of 565 in state 1st of 40 in county
- Time zone: UTC−05:00 (Eastern (EST))
  - Summer (DST): UTC−04:00 (Eastern (EDT))
- ZIP Code: 08075
- Area code: 856 exchanges: 461, 764, 824
- FIPS code: 3400563510
- GNIS feature ID: 0882098
- Website: www.riversidetwp.org

Riverside Township is a township in Burlington County, in the U.S. state of New Jersey. As of the 2020 United States census, the township's population was 8,003, a decrease of 76 (−0.9%) from the 2010 census count of 8,079, which in turn reflected an increase of 168 (+2.1%) from the 7,911 counted in the 2000 census. The township, and all of Burlington County, is a part of the Philadelphia metropolitan area.

Riverside was incorporated as a township by an act of the New Jersey Legislature on February 20, 1895, from portions of Delran Township. A portion of the township was annexed by Delran in 1901. The township was originally named Progress which was changed to Riverside for its location on the Delaware River.

== Geography ==
According to the United States Census Bureau, the township had a total area of 1.61 square miles (4.16 km^{2}), including 1.48 square miles (3.84 km^{2}) of land and 0.12 square miles (0.32 km^{2}) of water (7.70%).

The township borders the Burlington County municipalities of Delanco Township and Delran Township.

== Demographics ==
Historical population
Census	Pop.	Note	%±
1880	777		—
1890	1,340		72.5%
1900	2,581		92.6%
1910	4,011		55.4%
1920	6,018		50.0%
1930	7,061		17.3%
1940	7,072		0.2%
1950	7,199		1.8%
1960	8,474		17.7%
1970	8,591		1.4%
1980	7,941		−7.6%
1990	7,974		0.4%
2000	7,911		−0.8%
2010	8,079		2.1%
2020	8,003		−0.9%
2023 (est.)	8,056		0.7%
Population sources: 1880–1890; 1900–2000 1900–1920; 1900–1910 1910–1930; 1940–2000 2000; 2010 2020

=== 2010 census ===
The 2010 United States census counted 8,079 people, 2,959 households, and 2,027 families in the township. The population density was 5,425.9 per square mile (2,095.0/km^{2}). There were 3,147 housing units at an average density of 2,113.5 per square mile (816.0/km^{2}). The racial makeup was 80.21% (6,480) White, 6.39% (516) Black or African American, 0.26% (21) Native American, 0.95% (77) Asian, 0.05% (4) Pacific Islander, 7.04% (569) from other races, and 5.10% (412) from two or more races. Hispanic or Latino of any race were 11.34% (916) of the population.

Of the 2,959 households, 31.0% had children under the age of 18; 46.2% were married couples living together; 14.6% had a female householder with no husband present and 31.5% were non-families. Of all households, 24.3% were made up of individuals and 8.5% had someone living alone who was 65 years of age or older. The average household size was 2.73 and the average family size was 3.22.

23.1% of the population were under the age of 18, 9.9% from 18 to 24, 29.5% from 25 to 44, 27.0% from 45 to 64, and 10.5% who were 65 years of age or older. The median age was 36.3 years. For every 100 females, the population had 101.5 males. For every 100 females ages 18 and older there were 99.6 males.

The Census Bureau's 2006–2010 American Community Survey showed that (in 2010 inflation-adjusted dollars) median household income was $56,377 (with a margin of error of +/− $4,391) and the median family income was $65,825 (+/− $9,709). Males had a median income of $46,962 (+/− $4,387) versus $32,413 (+/− $6,739) for females. The per capita income for the borough was $24,243 (+/− $2,264). About 3.9% of families and 8.1% of the population were below the poverty line, including 7.4% of those under age 18 and 2.3% of those age 65 or over.

=== 2000 census ===
As of the 2000 United States census there were 7,911 people, 2,978 households, and 1,992 families residing in the township. The population density was 5,197.2 inhabitants per square mile (2,006.7/km^{2}). There were 3,118 housing units at an average density of 2,048.4 per square mile (790.9/km^{2}). The racial makeup of the township was 90.22% White, 4.44% African American, 0.14% Native American, 0.42% Asian, 0.01% Pacific Islander, 2.28% from other races, and 2.50% from two or more races. Hispanic or Latino of any race were 4.11% of the population.

There were 2,978 households, out of which 32.8% had children under the age of 18 living with them, 48.4% were married couples living together, 12.0% had a female householder with no husband present, and 33.1% were non-families. 27.3% of all households were made up of individuals, and 11.5% had someone living alone who was 65 years of age or older. The average household size was 2.64 and the average family size was 3.21.

In the township the population was spread out, with 25.0% under the age of 18, 8.4% from 18 to 24, 33.4% from 25 to 44, 19.4% from 45 to 64, and 13.8% who were 65 years of age or older. The median age was 36 years. For every 100 females, there were 99.0 males. For every 100 females age 18 and over, there were 98.2 males.

The median income for a household in the township was $43,358, and the median income for a family was $52,479. Males had a median income of $36,556 versus $25,510 for females. The per capita income for the township was $18,758. About 6.7% of families and 8.2% of the population were below the poverty line, including 7.4% of those under age 18 and 8.0% of those age 65 or over.

== Government ==
=== Local government ===
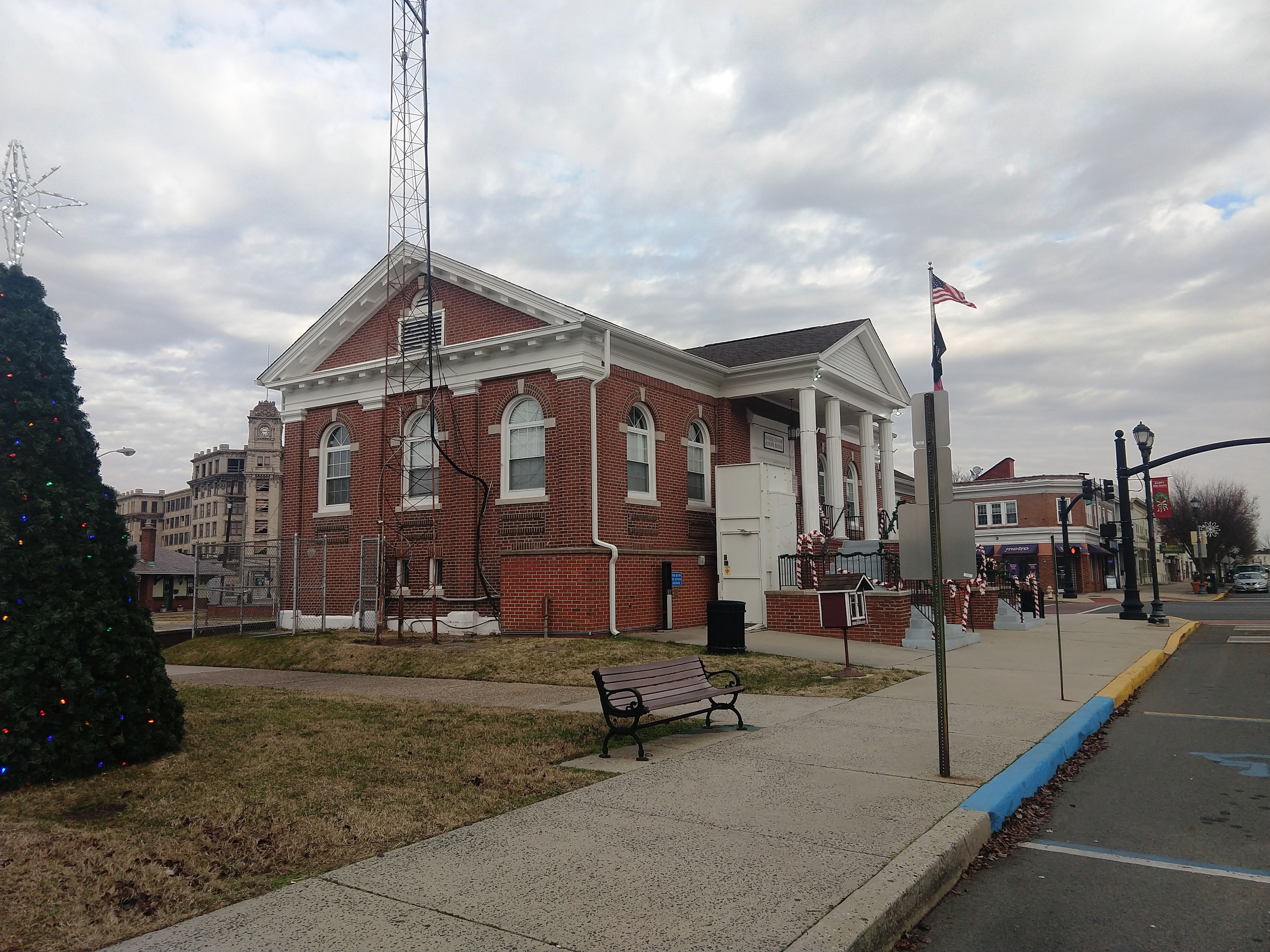
Riverside Township municipal building

Riverside Township is governed under the Township form of New Jersey municipal government, one of 141 municipalities (of the 564) statewide that use this form, the second-most commonly used form of government in the state. The Township Committee is comprised of five members, who are elected directly by the voters at-large in partisan elections to serve three-year terms of office on a staggered basis, with either one or two seats coming up for election each year as part of the November general election in a three-year cycle. At an annual reorganization meeting, the Township Committee selects one of its members to serve as Mayor and another as Deputy Mayor, each for a term of one year.

As of 2023, members of the Riverside Township Committee are Mayor Michael Higgins (R, term on committee ends December 31, 2023; term as mayor ends 2023), Deputy Mayor Corey S. Kimble (D, term on committee ends December 31, 2023; term as deputy mayor ends 2023), Robert Giovanetti (D, 2024), Matthew Kirk (R, 2024) and Joseph Peditto (R, 2025).

In March 2023, Higgins switched parties and announce that he would run as a Republican in November 2023; the switch gave Republicans a 3-2 majority on the council.

In March 2019, the Township Committee chose Michael Higgins from a list of three candidates nominated by the Democratic municipal committee to fill the seat expiring in December 2020 that became vacant when Michael D. Miller submitted his resignation. In the November 2019 general election, Republican Matthew Kirk defeated Higgins by a single vote and was elected to serve the balance of the term of office.

In January 2018, Republican F. Michael Hart was selected by the Township Committee from a list of three candidates nominated by the Republican municipal committee to fill the seat expiring in December 2019 that was vacated by Robert R. Prisco after he resigned to accept a Judicial appointment to a New Jersey Workers' Compensation Judgeship; Hart served on an interim basis until the November 2018 general election, when voters elected Democrat Michelle Weaver to serve the balance of the term of office.

In July 2016, Jason Frey was selected by the Township Committee to fill the seat expiring in December 2018 that was vacated by Timothy LeConey when he announced that he was resigning and moving out of the township. Frey served on an interim basis until the November 2016 general election, when he was elected to serve the balance of the term of office.

On Election Day, November 7, 2006, Mayor Chuck Hilton and fellow Republican incumbent James Ott were defeated by their Democratic opponents, newcomers Lorraine Hatcher and Thomas Polino. An anti-immigration ordinance passed by the Township Committee that imposed fines on any business that hires or any landlord who rents to an illegal immigrant was a major issue in the campaign.

=== Federal, state and county representation ===
Riverside is located in the 3rd Congressional District and is part of New Jersey's 7th state legislative district.

For the 119th United States Congress, New Jersey's 3rd congressional district is currently represented Herb Conaway (D, Delran Township). New Jersey is represented in the United States Senate by Democrats Cory Booker (Newark, term ends 2027) and Andy Kim (Moorestown, term ends 2031).

For the 2026–2027 session, the 7th legislative district of the New Jersey Legislature is represented in the State Senate by Troy Singleton (D, Palmyra) and in the General Assembly by Carol A. Murphy (D, Mount Laurel) and Balvir Singh (D, Burlington Township).

Burlington County is governed by a Board of County Commissioners comprised of five members who are chosen at-large in partisan elections to serve three-year terms of office on a staggered basis, with either one or two seats coming up for election each year; at an annual reorganization meeting, the board selects a director and deputy director from among its members to serve a one-year term. As of 2026, Burlington County's Commissioners are: Director Felicia Hopson (D, Willingboro Township, term as commissioner ends December 31, 2027; term as director ends 2026), Deputy Director Allison Eckel (D, Medford, term as commissioner ends 2028; term as deputy director ends 2026), Randy Brolo (D, Lumberton, 2026; elected to an unexpired term), Tyler Burrell (D, Delran Township, 2027) and Tom Pullion (D, Edgewater Park, 2026).

Burlington County's constitutional officers are Clerk Joanne Schwartz (D, Southampton Township, 2028), Sheriff James H. Kostoplis (D, Bordentown, 2028) and Surrogate Brian J. Carlin (D, Burlington Township, 2026).

=== Politics ===
United States presidential election results for Riverside Township 2024 2020 2016 2012 2008 2004
Year	Republican		Democratic		Third party(ies)	
Year	No.	%	No.	%	No.	%
2024	1,213	47.51%	1,305	51.12%	35	1.37%
2020	1,471	45.56%	1,707	52.86%	51	1.58%
2016	1,258	46.08%	1,368	50.11%	104	3.81%
2012	1,073	36.75%	1,816	62.19%	31	1.06%
2008	1,233	39.07%	1,881	59.60%	42	1.33%
2004	1,278	42.21%	1,726	57.00%	24	0.79%

As of March 2011, there were a total of 4,189 registered voters in Riverside Township, of which 1,527 (36.5% vs. 33.3% countywide) were registered as Democrats, 685 (16.4% vs. 23.9%) were registered as Republicans and 1,974 (47.1% vs. 42.8%) were registered as Unaffiliated. There were 3 voters registered as Libertarians or Greens. Among the township's 2010 Census population, 51.9% (vs. 61.7% in Burlington County) were registered to vote, including 67.4% of those ages 18 and over (vs. 80.3% countywide).

In the 2012 presidential election, Democrat Barack Obama received 1,816 votes here (61.7% vs. 58.1% countywide), ahead of Republican Mitt Romney with 1,073 votes (36.5% vs. 40.2%) and other candidates with 31 votes (1.1% vs. 1.0%), among the 2,941 ballots cast by the township's 4,329 registered voters, for a turnout of 67.9% (vs. 74.5% in Burlington County). In the 2008 presidential election, Democrat Barack Obama received 1,881 votes here (58.9% vs. 58.4% countywide), ahead of Republican John McCain with 1,233 votes (38.6% vs. 39.9%) and other candidates with 42 votes (1.3% vs. 1.0%), among the 3,191 ballots cast by the township's 4,278 registered voters, for a turnout of 74.6% (vs. 80.0% in Burlington County). In the 2004 presidential election, Democrat John Kerry received 1,726 votes here (56.7% vs. 52.9% countywide), ahead of Republican George W. Bush with 1,278 votes (42.0% vs. 46.0%) and other candidates with 24 votes (0.8% vs. 0.8%), among the 3,044 ballots cast by the township's 4,197 registered voters, for a turnout of 72.5% (vs. 78.8% in the whole county).

Gubernatorial election results for Riverside Township
Year	Republican		Democratic		Third party(ies)	
Year	No.	%	No.	%	No.	%
2025	873	43.72%	1,108	55.48%	16	0.80%
2021	838	52.21%	753	46.92%	14	0.87%
2017	584	42.66%	746	54.49%	39	2.85%
2013	1,018	60.96%	634	37.96%	18	1.08%
2009	821	45.43%	854	47.26%	132	7.30%
2005	661	35.90%	1,083	58.83%	97	5.27%

In the 2013 gubernatorial election, Republican Chris Christie received 1,018 votes here (59.4% vs. 61.4% countywide), ahead of Democrat Barbara Buono with 634 votes (37.0% vs. 35.8%) and other candidates with 18 votes (1.1% vs. 1.2%), among the 1,714 ballots cast by the township's 4,254 registered voters, yielding a 40.3% turnout (vs. 44.5% in the county). In the 2009 gubernatorial election, Democrat Jon Corzine received 854 ballots cast (46.4% vs. 44.5% countywide), ahead of Republican Chris Christie with 821 votes (44.6% vs. 47.7%), Independent Chris Daggett with 104 votes (5.7% vs. 4.8%) and other candidates with 28 votes (1.5% vs. 1.2%), among the 1,840 ballots cast by the township's 4,324 registered voters, yielding a 42.6% turnout (vs. 44.9% in the county).

United States Senate election results for Riverside Township1
Year	Republican		Democratic		Third party(ies)	
Year	No.	%	No.	%	No.	%
2024	1,023	42.47%	1,350	56.04%	36	1.49%
2018	1,100	48.06%	1,022	44.65%	167	7.30%
2012	954	34.73%	1,763	64.18%	30	1.09%
2006	787	43.70%	959	53.25%	55	3.05%

United States Senate election results for Riverside Township2
Year	Republican		Democratic		Third party(ies)	
Year	No.	%	No.	%	No.	%
2020	1,346	43.14%	1,709	54.78%	65	2.08%
2014	596	44.41%	710	52.91%	36	2.68%
2013	361	46.34%	396	50.83%	22	2.82%
2008	1,023	36.25%	1,743	61.76%	56	1.98%

== Education ==
The Riverside School District serves public school students in pre-kindergarten through twelfth grade. As of the 2019–20 school year, the district, comprised of three schools, had an enrollment of 1,470 students and 108.4 classroom teachers (on an FTE basis), for a student–teacher ratio of 13.6:1. Schools in the district (with 2019–20 enrollment data from the National Center for Education Statistics) are Riverside Township Elementary School with 708 students in grades Pre-K–5, Riverside Township Middle School with 292 students in grades 6–8 and Riverside Township High School with 423 students in grades 9–12.

Students from Delanco Township attend Riverside High School as part of a sending/receiving relationship with the Delanco Township School District.

Students from Riverside Township, and from all of Burlington County, are eligible to attend the Burlington County Institute of Technology, a countywide public school district that serves the vocational and technical education needs of students at the high school and post-secondary level at its campuses in Medford and Westampton.

== Transportation ==
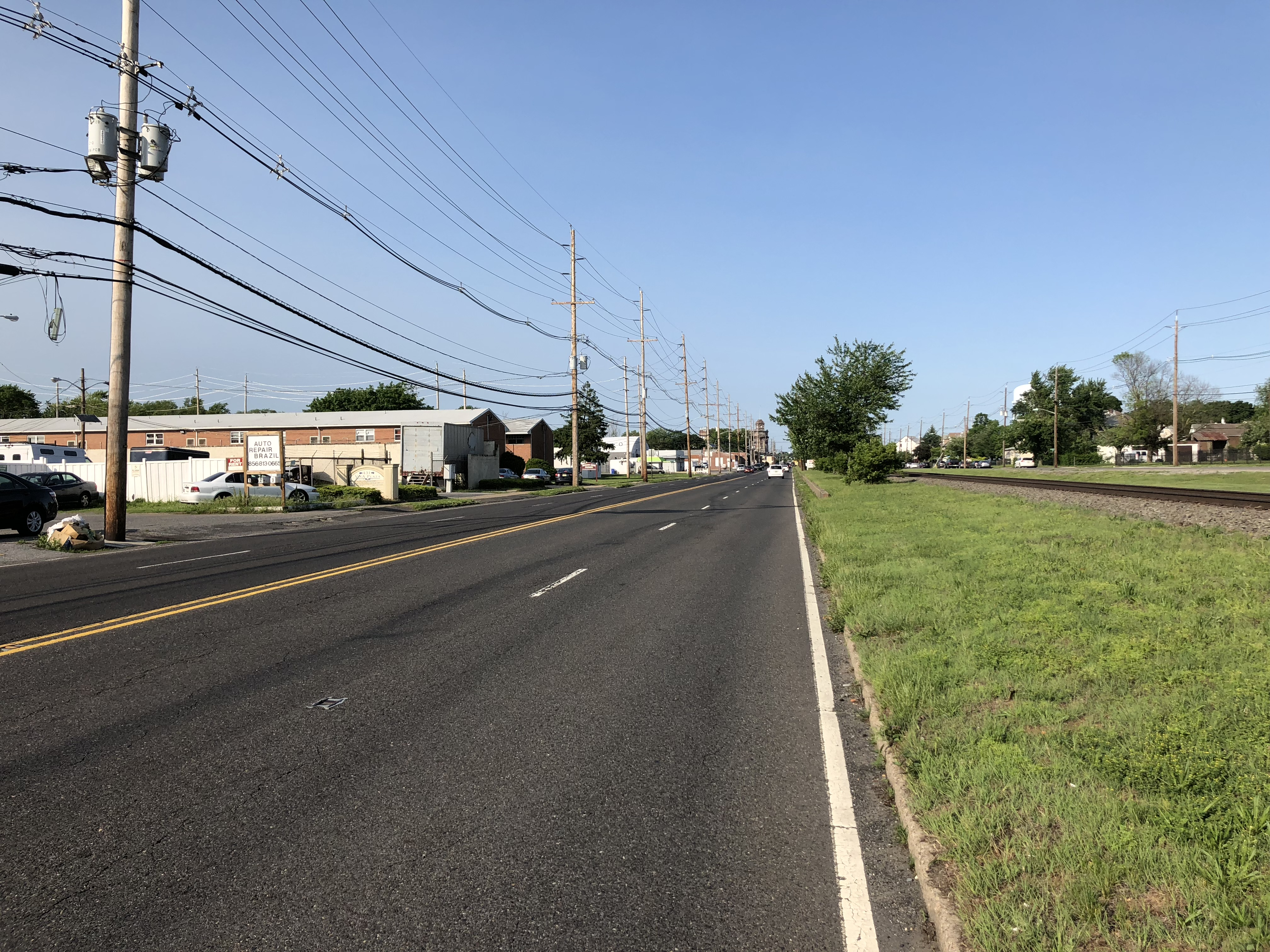
County Route 543 in Riverside

=== Roads and highways ===
As of May 2010, the township had a total of 27.39 miles (44.08 km) of roadways, of which 24.14 miles (38.85 km) were maintained by the municipality and 3.25 miles (5.23 km) by Burlington County.

No Interstate, U.S. or state highways directly serve Riverside Township. The most significant road passing through the township is County Route 543.

=== Public transportation ===
The Riverside station, located on Zubrugg Way (formerly Franklin Street), provides service on the River Line light rail system, offering southbound service to Camden and the Walter Rand Transportation Center with connections to PATCO Speedline trains to Philadelphia and the Camden County suburbs and northbound service to the Trenton Rail Station with connections to NJ Transit trains to New York City, SEPTA trains to Philadelphia, and Amtrak trains.

NJ Transit provides bus service in the borough on the 419 route that runs between Camden and Burlington.

== In film ==
Riverside was used for the filming of the film Jesus' Son and was the site of picketing by nuns who objected to the implication from the film's title that Jesus fathered a child.

== Immigration debate ==
In July 2006, a controversial ordinance was passed by the township committee trying to handle the large number of unauthorized immigrants, primarily from Brazil, that had moved into the township. The ordinance stated that employers who hired an illegal immigrant and landlords who rented to them would be fined $1,000 - $2,000 per incident and could possibly lose their business license. In response to the ordinance, several civil groups including the ACLU and People for the American Way took or contemplated legal actions against the ordinance.

In August 2007, the ordinance was repealed, and some have speculated that the exodus of over 1,000 immigrants from Riverside to other New Jersey townships was a major factor. The ordinance repealing the law cited the high cost of defending it against further legal challenges.

== Notable people ==
Many people born in Riverside Township were born at Zurbrugg Hospital during a period of about 75 years beginning in 1915. People who were born in, residents of, or otherwise closely associated with Riverside Township include:

- Jim Bailey (1938–2015), singer, film, television and stage actor and female impersonator
- Deron Cherry (born 1959), safety who played for the NFL Kansas City Chiefs from 1981 to 1991 and was a six-time Pro Bowler
- Lesley Choyce (born 1951), author
- Gerry Collins (born 1969), former professional football running back who played in the Canadian Football League (CFL) with the Ottawa Rough Riders and Edmonton Eskimos
- Bill Duff (born 1974), former professional football player who has been host of Human Weapon on the History Channel
- John W. Dutko (1916–1944), recipient of the Medal of Honor for his actions against German troops in Italy during World War II
- Benjamin Faunce (1873–1949), druggist and businessman
- Kenneth William Faulkner (born 1947), former member of the New Jersey General Assembly, who was a teacher, school administrator and basketball coach at Burlington Township High School
- Michael Giacchino (born 1967), composer, known for film scores'
- Derek Holloway (born 1961), retired football player, who was a wide receiver in the NFL for the Washington Redskins and the Tampa Bay Buccaneers
- Adam Hughes (born 1967), comic book artist
- George Lehmann (born 1942), former professional basketball player who played in the NBA and ABA
- Todd Lehmann, former basketball player (and son of George Lehmann), who played for Drexel University where he led the nation with 9.29 assists per game in his senior year
- Pierre Leon (1838–1915), Medal of Honor recipient for his actions during the Civil War
- A. Raymond Randolph (born 1943), judge on the United States Court of Appeals for the District of Columbia Circuit
- Earl Rowe (1920–2002), actor best known for playing Lt. Dave Barton in the 1958 film The Blob

Preceded by Delanco Township	Bordering communities of Philadelphia	Succeeded by Delran Township
