= 1991 New Jersey General Assembly election =

- November 5, 1991

All 80 seats in the New Jersey General Assembly 41 seats needed for a majority
- Turnout: 51% (▼9pp)

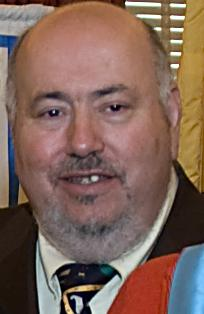
	Majority party	Minority party
Leader	Chuck Haytaian	Joe Doria
Party	Republican	Democratic
Leader since	January 9, 1990	January 12, 1988
Leader's seat	23rd (Independence Township)	31st (Bayonne)
Last election	36	44
Seats before	37	43
Seats won	58	22
Seat change	▲21	▼21
- Results: Republican gain Republican hold Democratic hold
Speaker before election
Joe Doria
Democratic
Elected Speaker
Chuck Haytaian
Republican

The 1991 New Jersey General Assembly election was held on November 5, 1991.

The elections took place midway through Jim Florio's term as Governor of New Jersey. As in the concurrent New Jersey Senate elections, the Republican Party won a historic landslide, gaining 21 seats to win veto-proof supermajorities in both chambers of the state legislature. Republicans flipped at least one seat in thirteen Assembly districts and both seats in eight districts, dominating in the New Jersey suburbs and reducing the Democratic Party to a handful of urban centers.

As of 2026, the Republican Assembly majority of 58 seats is the largest for the Republican party since the adoption of the district map in 1973. This is the last time that Republicans held a veto-proof majority in the chamber, and the last for either party until 2017. Republicans flipped one seat in districts 1, 2, 15, 21, and 34, as well as both seats in districts 4, 7, 10, 11, 14, 18, 19, and 36. From 1992 to 2002, Republicans controlled the Assembly.

== Background ==
=== Redistricting ===
1982–92

1992–2002

New Jersey Legislature before (left) and after (right) the 1991 redistricting

As required, the New Jersey legislature redistricted its state legislative districts in advance of the 1991 election. Redistricting was on balance considered to have favored Republicans.

=== Tax increase ===
A centerpiece of the Florio administration's legislative agenda was the passage of a $2.8 billion tax increase. Republicans centered their 1991 campaign on opposition to the increase, as did even some incumbent Democrats, such as Senator Paul Contillo. According to the Florio administration, the tax increase was designed to aid blue-collar workers, who were "also the people most upset by enactment of the taxes."

=== Gun control ===
A strict gun control measure was another major legislative achievement of the Florio administration. The bill's passage led the National Rifle Association of America to spend nearly $250,000 in the 1991 elections targeting candidates in both parties who had voted in favor of the bill and supporting those who pledged to repeal it.

== Incumbents not running for re-election ==
=== Democratic ===
- Anthony S. Marsella (District 4) (ran for State Senate)
- John Paul Doyle (District 10) (ran for State Senate)
- David C. Schwartz (District 17)
- Jim McGreevey (District 19) (lost party support, ran for Mayor of Woodbridge)
- Michael F. Adubato (District 28)
- Bob Menendez (District 31) (ran for State Senate)
- Joseph Mecca (District 34) (ran for State Senate)
- John Girgenti (District 35) (ran for State Senate)

Additionally, several Democrats resigned their seats late in the 1991 campaign to join the Florio administration, including Joseph D. Patero, Edward H. Salmon, Frank M. Pelly.

=== Republican ===
- Dolores Cooper (District 2) (ran for State Senate as independent, but dropped out)
- Joe Kyrillos (District 13) (ran for State Senate)
- Chuck Hardwick (District 21)
- Bill Schluter (District 23) (redistricted to District 24, ran for State Senate)
- Louis F. Kosco (District 38) (ran for State Senate)

== Summary of races ==
Voters in each legislative district elect two members to the New Jersey General Assembly.

District	Incumbent	Party	Elected	Party
1st Legislative District	Frank LoBiondo	Rep	Frank LoBiondo	Rep
1st Legislative District	Raymond A. Batten (Note: Batten was appointed in after Assemblyman Edward H. Salmon resigned in April 1991 to join the Board of Public Utilities.)	Dem	John C. Gibson	Rep
2nd Legislative District	Fred Scerni	Dem	John F. Gaffney	Rep
2nd Legislative District	Dolores G. Cooper	Rep	Frederick P. Nickles	Rep
3rd Legislative District	Jack Collins	Rep	Jack Collins	Rep
3rd Legislative District	Gary Stuhltrager	Rep	Gary Stuhltrager	Rep
4th Legislative District	Anthony S. Marsella	Dem	Ginny Weber	Rep
4th Legislative District	Ann A. Mullen	Dem	George Geist	Rep
5th Legislative District	Joseph J. Roberts (Note: Roberts won a July 1991 special election to complete the unexpired term of Assemblyman Francis J. Gorman, who resigned due to poor health.)	Dem	Joseph J. Roberts	Dem
5th Legislative District	Wayne R. Bryant	Dem	Wayne R. Bryant	Dem
6th Legislative District	John A. Rocco	Rep	John A. Rocco	Rep
6th Legislative District	Lee Solomon (Note: Solomon was appointed to complete the unexpired term of Assemblyman Thomas J. Shusted, who resigned to become Camden County counsel.)	Rep	Lee Solomon	Rep
7th Legislative District	Barbara Kalik	Dem	Priscilla B. Anderson	Rep
7th Legislative District	Jack Casey (Note: Casey was appointed to complete the unexpired term of Assemblyman Thomas P. Foy, who had resigned to take a seat in the State Senate.)	Dem	José F. Sosa	Rep
8th Legislative District	Harold L. Colburn Jr.	Rep	Harold L. Colburn Jr.	Rep
8th Legislative District	Robert C. Shinn Jr.	Rep	Robert C. Shinn Jr.	Rep
9th Legislative District	Christopher Connors	Rep	Christopher Connors	Rep
9th Legislative District	Jeffrey Moran	Rep	Jeffrey Moran	Rep
10th Legislative District	John Paul Doyle	Dem	Ginny Haines	Rep
10th Legislative District	Marlene Lynch Ford	Dem	David W. Wolfe	Rep
11th Legislative District	Daniel P. Jacobson	Dem	Tom Smith	Rep
11th Legislative District	John Villapiano	Dem	Steve Corodemus	Rep
12th Legislative District	Clare Farragher	Rep	Clare Farragher	Rep
12th Legislative District	Michael Arnone	Rep	Michael Arnone	Rep
13th Legislative District	Joe Kyrillos	Rep	Joseph Azzolina	Rep
13th Legislative District	Joann H. Smith	Rep	Joann H. Smith	Rep
14th Legislative District	Peter A. Cantu (Note: Cantu was appointed to complete the unexpired term of Assembylman Joseph D. Patero, who resigned in August 1991 to join the Department of Labor.)	Dem	Paul Kramer	Rep
14th Legislative District	Anthony Cimino	Dem	Barbara Wright	Rep
15th Legislative District	John S. Watson	Dem	John S. Watson	Dem
15th Legislative District	Gerald S. Naples	Dem	John Hartmann	Rep
16th Legislative District	Walter J. Kavanaugh	Rep	Walter J. Kavanaugh	Rep
16th Legislative District	John S. Penn	Rep	John S. Penn	Rep
17th Legislative District	David C. Schwartz	Dem	Jerry Green	Dem
17th Legislative District	Bob Smith	Dem	Bob Smith	Dem
18th Legislative District	George A. Spadoro	Dem	Harriet Derman	Rep
18th Legislative District	Michael J. Baker (Note: Baker was appointed to complete the unexpired term of Frank M. Pelly, who resigned in July 1991 to become executive director of the New Jersey Lottery.)	Dem	Jeff Warsh	Rep
19th Legislative District	George Otlowski	Dem	Stephen A. Mikulak	Rep
19th Legislative District	Jim McGreevey	Dem	Ernest L. Oros	Rep
20th Legislative District	George Hudak	Dem	George Hudak	Dem
20th Legislative District	Thomas J. Deverin (Note: Redistricted to District 19.)	Dem	Tom Dunn	Dem
21st Legislative District	Chuck Hardwick	Rep	Monroe Jay Lustbader	Rep
21st Legislative District	Neil M. Cohen	Dem	Maureen Ogden	Rep
22nd Legislative District	Bob Franks	Rep	Bob Franks	Rep
22nd Legislative District	Maureen Ogden (Note: Redistricted to District 21.)	Rep	Richard Bagger	Rep
23rd Legislative District	Bill Schluter (Note: Redistricted to District 24.)	Rep	Chuck Haytaian	Rep
23rd Legislative District	Dick Kamin (Note: Redistricted to District 24.)	Rep	Leonard Lance	Rep
24th Legislative District	Scott Garrett (Note: Garrett was appointed to the seat in November 1990 to complete the unexpired term of Assemblyman Robert E. Littell, who resigned to join the State Senate.)	Rep	Scott Garrett	Rep
24th Legislative District	Chuck Haytaian (Note: Redistricted to District 23.)	Rep	Dick Kamin	Rep
25th Legislative District	Rodney Frelinghuysen	Rep	Rodney Frelinghuysen	Rep
25th Legislative District	Arthur R. Albohn	Rep	Arthur R. Albohn	Rep
26th Legislative District	Robert J. Martin	Rep	Robert J. Martin	Rep
26th Legislative District	Alex DeCroce	Rep	Alex DeCroce	Rep
27th Legislative District	Harry A. McEnroe (Note: Redistricted to District 28.)	Dem	Robert L. Brown	Dem
27th Legislative District	Mildred Barry Garvin	Dem	Stephanie R. Bush	Dem
28th Legislative District	Michael Adubato	Dem	Harry McEnroe	Dem
28th Legislative District	James Zangari	Dem	James Zangari	Dem
29th Legislative District	Willie B. Brown	Dem	Willie B. Brown	Dem
29th Legislative District	Eugene H. Thompson	Dem	Jackie Mattison	Dem
30th Legislative District	John V. Kelly (Note: Redistricted to District 36.)	Rep	Robert Singer	Rep
30th Legislative District	Marion Crecco (Note: Redistricted to District 34.)	Rep	Melvin Cottrell	Rep
31st Legislative District	Joe Doria	Dem	Joe Doria	Dem
31st Legislative District	Joseph Charles	Dem	Joseph Charles	Dem
32nd Legislative District	Anthony Impreveduto	Dem	Anthony Improveduto	Dem
32nd Legislative District	David C. Kronick	Dem	David C. Kronick	Dem
33rd Legislative District	Bernard Kenny	Dem	Bernard Kenny	Dem
33rd Legislative District	Bob Menendez	Dem	Louis Romano	Dem
34th Legislative District	Gerald Zecker	Rep	Gerald Zecker	Rep
34th Legislative District	Joseph Mecca	Dem	Marion Crecco	Rep
35th Legislative District	Frank Catania (Note: Catania won a 1990 special election to complete the unexpired term of Assemblyman John Girgenti, who resigned to join the State Senate.)	Rep	Frank Catania	Rep
35th Legislative District	Bill Pascrell	Dem	Bill Pascrell	Dem
36th Legislative District	Louis J. Gill	Dem	John V. Kelly	Rep
36th Legislative District	Thomas J. Duch (Note: Redistricted to District 38.)	Dem	Paul DiGaetano	Rep
37th Legislative District	D. Bennett Mazur	Dem	D. Bennett Mazur	Dem
37th Legislative District	Byron Baer	Dem	Byron Baer	Dem
38th Legislative District	Rose Marie Heck	Rep	Rose Marie Heck	Rep
38th Legislative District	Patrick J. Roma	Rep	Patrick J. Roma	Rep
39th Legislative District	John E. Rooney	Rep	John E. Rooney	Rep
39th Legislative District	Charlotte Vandervalk (Note: Vandervalk was appointed to complete the unexpired term of Assemblywoman Elizabeth Randall, who resigned in January 1991 to become Bergen County counsel.)	Rep	Charlotte Vandervalk	Rep
40th Legislative District	David C. Russo	Rep	David C. Russo	Rep
40th Legislative District	Nicholas Felice	Rep	Nicholas Felice	Rep

=== Close races ===
Districts where the difference of total votes between the top-two parties was under 10%:

1. District 11, 1.8% gain
2. District 4, 2.8% gain
3. District 2, 3.8% gain R
4. District 20, 4.2%
5. District 7, 4.6% gain
6. District 35, 4.8%
7. District 17, 5.5%
8. District 15, 5.55% gain R
9. District 37, 6.9%
10. District 13, 8.6%
11. District 19, 9.2% gain

== District 1 ==
=== General election ===
==== Candidates ====
- Raymond A. Batten, incumbent Assembly member (Democratic)
- John C. Gibson (Republican)
- Frank LoBiondo, incumbent Assembly member since 1988 (Republican)
- Jennifer R. Lookabaugh (Democratic)

==== Results ====
New Jersey general election, 1991
Party	Candidate	Votes	%
Republican	Frank A. LoBiondo (incumbent)	32,063	31.7%
Republican	John C. Gibson	28,402	28.1%
Democratic	Jennifer R. Lookabaugh	20,872	20.6%
Democratic	Raymond A. Batten (incumbent)	19,803	19.6%
Total votes		101,140	100.0

== District 2 ==
=== General election ===
==== Candidates ====
- Tom Foley (Democratic)
- John F. Gaffney, Atlantic County Freeholder and former mayor of Linwood (Republican)
- Frederick P. Nickles (Republican)
- Fred Scerni, incumbent Assembly member since 1990 (Democratic)

==== Results ====
New Jersey general election, 1991
Party	Candidate	Votes	%
Republican	John F. Gaffney	21,833	26.5%
Republican	Fredrick P. Nickles	20,948	25.4%
Democratic	Fred Scerni (incumbent)	20,503	24.9%
Democratic	Tom Foley	19,095	23.2%
Total votes		82,379	100.0

== District 3 ==
=== General election ===
==== Candidates ====
- Jack Collins, incumbent Assembly member since 1986 (Republican)
- Albert S. Fogg III (Populist)
- James H. Orr Jr. (Populist)
- Gary Stuhltrager, incumbent Assembly member since 1986 (Republican)
- Nancy L. Sungenis (Democratic)
- Benjamin W. Timberman (Democratic)

==== Results ====
New Jersey general election, 1991
Party	Candidate	Votes	%
Republican	Jack Collins (incumbent)	30,117	29.4%
Republican	Gary W. Stuhltrager (incumbent)	29,314	28.6%
Democratic	Benjamin W. Timberman	20,241	19.8%
Democratic	Nancy L. Sungenis	20,147	19.7%
Populist	James H. Orr Jr.	1,354	1.3%
Populist	Albert S. Fogg, III	1,302	1.3%
Total votes		102,475	100.0

== District 4 ==
=== General election ===
==== Candidates ====
- George Geist (Republican)
- Ann A. Mullen, incumbent Assembly member since (Democratic)
- Timothy D. Scaffidi (Democratic)
- Mary Virginia Weber (Republican)

==== Results ====
New Jersey general election, 1991
Party	Candidate	Votes	%
Republican	Mary Virginia "Ginny" Weber	21,262	26.2%
Republican	George F. Geist	20,455	25.2%
Democratic	Ann A. Mullen (incumbent)	20,143	24.8%
Democratic	Timothy D. Scaffidi	19,285	23.8%
Total votes		81,145	100.0

== District 5 ==
=== General election ===
==== Candidates ====
- Wayne R. Bryant, incumbent Assembly member since 1982 (Democratic)
- Walter Jost (Republican)
- John Randall (Republican)
- Joseph J. Roberts, incumbent Assembly member since 1987 (Democratic)

==== Results ====
New Jersey general election, 1991
Party	Candidate	Votes	%
Democratic	Wayne R. Bryant (incumbent)	24,592	32.3%
Democratic	Joe Roberts (incumbent)	24,322	31.9%
Republican	Walter Jost	14,124	18.5%
Republican	Rev. John Randall	13,197	17.3%
Total votes		76,235	100.0

== District 6 ==
=== General election ===
==== Candidates ====
- Lewis Friedner (Democratic)
- Leonard P. Krivy (Democratic)
- John A. Rocco, incumbent Assembly member since 1980 (Republican)
- Lee Solomon (Republican)

==== Results ====
New Jersey general election, 1991
Party	Candidate	Votes	%
Republican	John A. Rocco (incumbent)	31,533	28.5%
Republican	Lee A. Solomon	31,095	28.1%
Democratic	Lewis “Robbie” Friedner	24,231	21.9%
Democratic	Dr. Leonard P. Krivy	23,920	21.6%
Total votes		110,779	100.0

== District 7 ==
=== General election ===
==== Candidates ====
- Priscilla B. Anderson, mayor of Willingboro and Trenton Public Schools guidance counselor (Republican)
- Jack Casey, incumbent Assembly member since January 1991 and former mayor of Palmyra (Democratic)
- Barbara Kalik, incumbent Assembly member since 1978 (Democratic)
- José F. Sosa, mayor of Mount Holly (Republican)

==== Results ====
New Jersey general election, 1991
Party	Candidate	Votes	%
Republican	Priscilla B. Anderson	25,989	26.2%
Republican	Jose F. Sosa	25,925	26.1%
Democratic	Barbara Faith Kalik (incumbent)	23,953	24.2%
Democratic	John “Jack” Casey (incumbent)	23,307	23.5%
Total votes		99,174	100.0

== District 8 ==
=== General election ===
==== Candidates ====
- James S. Brophy (Democratic)
- Harold L. Colburn Jr., incumbent Assembly member since 1984 (Republican)
- Robert C. Shinn Jr., incumbent Assembly member since 1985 (Republican)
- Arthur J. Zeichner (Democratic)

==== Results ====
New Jersey general election, 1991
Party	Candidate	Votes	%
Republican	Robert C. Shinn (incumbent)	27,834	32.5%
Republican	Harold L. Colburn (incumbent)	27,631	32.3%
Democratic	James S. Brophy	15,374	18.0%
Democratic	Arthur J. Zeichner	14,726	17.2%
Total votes		85,565	100.0

== District 9 ==
=== General election ===
==== Candidates ====
- Christopher J. Connors, incumbent Assembly member since 1990 (Republican)
- Edward W. Frydendahl Jr. (Democratic)
- Jeffrey Moran, incumbent Assembly member since 1986 (Republican)
- Len Morano (Democratic)

==== Results ====
New Jersey general election, 1991
Party	Candidate	Votes	%
Republican	Christopher J. Connors (incumbent)	41,977	34.7%
Republican	Jeffrey W. Moran (incumbent)	41,928	34.6%
Democratic	Len Morano	18,821	15.5%
Democratic	Edward W. Frydendahl Jr.	18,388	15.2%
Total votes		121,114	100.0

== District 10 ==
=== General election ===
==== Candidates ====
- Paul C. Brush (Democratic)
- Marlene Lynch Ford, incumbent Assembly member since 1990 (Note: Lynch Ford previously served in the Assembly from 1984 to 1986.) (Democratic)
- Virginia E. Haines, former clerk of the General Assembly (Republican)
- David W. Wolfe (Republican)

==== Results ====
New Jersey general election, 1991
Party	Candidate	Votes	%
Republican	Virginia “Ginny” Haines	35,093	31.6%
Republican	David W. Wolfe	34,368	30.9%
Democratic	Marlene Lynch Ford (incumbent)	21,384	19.2%
Democratic	Paul C. Brush	20,311	18.3%
Total votes		111,156	100.0

== District 11 ==
=== General election ===
==== Candidates ====
- Steve Corodemus, member of the Monmouth County Planning Board and former president of the Atlantic Highlands Borough Council (Republican)
- Robert J. Furlong Sr. (I Represent You)
- Daniel P. Jacobson, incumbent Assembly member since 1990 (Democratic)
- James W. Manning (Truth in Government)
- Tom Smith, mayor of Asbury Park (Republican)
- John Villapiano, incumbent Assembly member since 1988 and former Monmouth County Freeholder (Democratic)

==== Results ====
New Jersey general election, 1991
Party	Candidate	Votes	%
Republican	Tom Smith	27,024	25.5%
Republican	Steve Corodemus	26,966	25.4%
Democratic	John A. Villapiano (incumbent)	23,703	22.4%
Democratic	Daniel P. Jacobson (incumbent)	21,864	20.6%
Truth in Government	James W. Manning	3,750	3.5%
I Represent You	Robert J. Furlong, Sr.	2,653	2.5%
Total votes		105,960	100.0

== District 12 ==
=== General election ===
==== Candidates ====
- Michael Arnone, incumbent Assembly member since 1988 and former mayor of Red Bank (Republican)
- Arnold Bellush (Democratic)
- James H. Dorn (Accountable Independent)
- Clare Farragher, incumbent Assembly member since 1987 and member of the Freehold Township Committee (Republican)
- Michael A. Ferguson (Democratic)
- Virginia A. Flynn (Libertarian)
- Donald W. Jamison (Libertarian)

==== Results ====
New Jersey general election, 1991
Party	Candidate	Votes	%
Republican	Michael J. Arnone (incumbent)	33,772	32.0%
Republican	Clare M. Farragher (incumbent)	33,657	31.9%
Democratic	Michael A. Ferguson	17,168	16.3%
Democratic	Arnold Bellush	16,625	15.8%
Accountable Independent	James H. Dorn	1,867	1.8%
Libertarian	Virginia A. Flynn	1,396	1.3%
Libertarian	Donald W. Jamison	971	0.9%
Total votes		105,456	100.0

== District 13 ==
=== General election ===
==== Candidates ====
- Irvin B. Beaver
- Richard A. Cooper
- Joe Kyrillos, incumbent Assembly member since 1988 (Republican)
- Claudia Montelione (Libertarian)
- Joann H. Smith, incumbent Assembly member since 1986 (Republican)

==== Results ====
New Jersey general election, 1991
Party	Candidate	Votes	%	±%
Republican	Joseph M. Kyrillos Jr. (incumbent)	31,934	27.9%	
Republican	Joann H. Smith (incumbent)	30,259	26.4%	
Democratic	Richard A. Cooper	26,391	23.0%	
Democratic	Irvin B. Beaver	25,700	22.4%	
Libertarian	Claudia Montelione	345	0.3%	
Total votes		'114,629'	'100.0'	

== District 14 ==
=== General election ===
==== Candidates ====
- Peter A. Cantu, incumbent Assembly member since August 1991 (Democratic)
- Anthony J. Cimino, incumbent Assembly member since 1988 (Democratic)
- Paul Kramer, Mercer County Freeholder (Republican)
- Kevin John Meara (Regular Independent Organization)
- Paul Rizzo (Senior Power)
- Barbara Wright, former mayor of Plainsboro Township (Republican)

==== Results ====
New Jersey general election, 1991
Party	Candidate	Votes	%	±%
Republican	Paul Kramer	31,944	29.1%	
Republican	Barbara Wright	29,655	27.0%	
Democratic	Anthony J. “Skip” Cimino (incumbent)	21,537	19.6%	
Democratic	Peter A. Cantu (incumbent)	18,168	16.6%	
Regular Independent Organization	Kevin John Meara	5,145	4.7%	
Senior Power	Paul Rizzo	3,231	2.9%	
Total votes		109,680	100.0	

== District 15 ==
=== General election ===
==== Candidates ====
- Robert Gunderman (Coalition of One)
- John Hartmann, Seton Hall University School of Law student (Republican)
- Bucky Leggett (Making Government Work)
- Gerard S. Naples, incumbent Assembly member since 1982 (Democratic)
- Steven Schlossstein (Making Government Work)
- John S. Watson, incumbent Assembly member since 1982 (Democratic)
- Channell Wilkins (Republican)

==== Results ====
New Jersey general election, 1991
Party	Candidate	Votes	%
Republican	John Hartmann	22,091	25.2%
Democratic	John S. Watson (incumbent)	18,713	21.33%
Republican	Channell Wilkins	18,578	21.18%
Democratic	Gerard S. Naples (incumbent)	17,081	19.5%
Making Government Work	Steven Schlossstein	5,148	5.9%
Making Government Work	W. Oliver “Bucky” Leggett	4,655	5.3%
Coalition of One	Robert Gunderman	1,448	1.7%
Total votes		87,714	100.0

== District 16 ==
=== General election ===
==== Candidates ====
- Walter J. Kavanaugh, incumbent Assembly member since 1978 (Republican)
- John S. Penn, incumbent Assembly member since 1984 (Republican)
- Julia Pepe Cino (Democratic)
- James C. Walker (Democratic)

==== Results ====
New Jersey general election, 1991
Party	Candidate	Votes	%
Republican	Walter J. Kavanaugh (incumbent)	33,849	35.5%
Republican	John S. Penn (incumbent)	32,108	33.7%
Democratic	James C. Walker	14,940	15.7%
Democratic	Julia Pepe Cino	14,365	15.1%
Total votes		95,262	100.0

== District 17 ==
=== General election ===
==== Candidates ====
- Joseph S. Ginn (The People's Voice)
- Jerry Green, Union County Freeholder (Democratic)
- Frank A. Santoro (Republican)
- Bob Smith, incumbent Assembly member since 1986 (Democratic)
- Al Olszewski (Populist)
- Barbara Weigel (Republican)
- Moses Williams (Equal Justice Committee)

==== Results ====
New Jersey general election, 1991
Party	Candidate	Votes	%
Democratic	Bob Smith (incumbent)	17,206	26.1%
Democratic	Jerry Green	16,449	24.9%
Republican	Barbara “Bobbie” Weigel	15,165	23.0%
Republican	Frank A. Santoro	14,827	22.5%
Equal Justice Committee	Moses Williams	818	1.2%
Populist	Al Olszewski	759	1.2%
The People's Voice	Joseph S. Ginn	728	1.1%
Total votes		65,952	100.0

== District 18 ==
=== General election ===
==== Candidates ====
- Michael Baker, incumbent Assembly member since July 1991 (Democratic)
- Harriet Derman, tax attorney (Republican)
- George A. Spadoro, incumbent Assembly member 1988 (Democratic)
- Jeff Warsh (Republican)

==== Results ====
New Jersey general election, 1991
Party	Candidate	Votes	%
Republican	Harriet Derman	30,946	29.6%
Republican	Jeff Warsh	29,631	28.4%
Democratic	George A. Spadoro (incumbent)	22,132	21.2%
Democratic	Michael Baker (incumbent)	21,674	20.8%
Total votes		104,383	100.0

== District 19 ==
=== General election ===
==== Candidates ====
- Thomas J. Deverin, incumbent Assembly member since 1970 (Democratic)
- Stephen A. Mikulak (Republican)
- Ernest L. Oros, member of the Woodbridge Township Council (Republican)
- Jay Ziznewski (Democratic)

==== Results ====
New Jersey general election, 1991
Party	Candidate	Votes	%
Republican	Stephen A. Mikulak	24,761	27.8%
Republican	Ernest L. Oros	23,908	26.8%
Democratic	Thomas J. Deverin	20,673	23.2%
Democratic	Jay Ziznewski	19,774	22.2%
Total votes		89,116	100.0

== District 20 ==
=== General election ===
==== Candidates ====
- Tom Dunn, mayor of Elizabeth and former member of the State Senate (Democratic)
- Philip G. Gentile (Republican)
- George Hudak, incumbent Assembly member since 1986 (Democratic)
- Richard E. Hunt (Republican)

==== Results ====
New Jersey general election, 1991
Party	Candidate	Votes	%
Democratic	George Hudak (incumbent)	15,032	26.7%
Democratic	Tom Dunn	14,442	25.7%
Republican	Richard E. Hunt	13,555	24.1%
Republican	Philip G. Gentile	13,188	23.5%
Total votes		56,217	100.0

== District 21 ==
=== General election ===
==== Candidates ====
- Bill Ciccone (Populist)
- Neil M. Cohen, incumbent Assembly member since 1990 (Democratic)
- Frank Covello (Democratic)
- Monroe Jay Lustbader, Essex County Freeholder (Republican)
- Maureen Ogden, incumbent Assembly member since 1982 (Republican)

==== Results ====
New Jersey general election, 1991
Party	Candidate	Votes	%
Republican	Maureen Ogden (incumbent)	34,282	32.4%
Republican	Monroe Jay Lustbader	33,914	32.1%
Democratic	Neil M. Cohen (incumbent)	20,460	19.3%
Democratic	Frank Covello	15,928	15.1%
Populist	Bill Ciccone	1,212	1.1%
Total votes		105,796	100.0

== District 22 ==
=== General election ===
==== Candidates ====
- Richard Bagger, mayor of Westfield (Republican)
- Bob Franks, incumbent Assembly member since 1980 and chair of the New Jersey Republican Party (Republican)
- Edward Kahn (Democratic)
- Richard Kress (Democratic)

==== Results ====
New Jersey general election, 1991
Party	Candidate	Votes	%
Republican	Bob Franks (incumbent)	37,087	37.9%
Republican	Richard H. Bagger	36,704	37.5%
Democratic	Edward Kahn	12,241	12.5%
Democratic	Richard Kress	11,900	12.2%
Total votes		97,932	100.0

== District 23 ==
=== General election ===
==== Candidates ====
- Rosemarie Albanese (Democratic)
- Diane Bowman (Democratic)
- Frederick P. Cook (Reduce Insurance Rates)
- Chuck Haytaian, incumbent Assembly member since 1982 (Republican)
- Leonard Lance, incumbent Assembly member since February 1991 (Republican)
- Charles D. Meyer (Citizen Not Politician)

==== Results ====
New Jersey general election, 1991
Party	Candidate	Votes	%
Republican	Garabed “Chuck” Haytaian (incumbent)	31,372	32.8%
Republican	Leonard Lance	28,879	30.2%
Democratic	Rosemarie A. Albanese	14,621	15.3%
Democratic	Diane Bowman	12,278	12.8%
Citizen Not Politician	Charles D. Meyer	5,163	5.4%
Reduce Insurance Rates	Frederick P. Cook	2,373	2.5%
Populist	Joseph J. Notarangelo	919	1.0%
Total votes		95,605	100.0

== District 24 ==
=== General election ===
==== Candidates ====
- Stuart Bacha (Populist)
- Scott Garrett, incumbent Assembly member since 1990 (Republican)
- Dick Kamin, incumbent Assembly member since 1986 (Republican)
- Michael J. Larose (Democratic)
- Compton C. Pakenham (Populist)

==== Results ====
New Jersey general election, 1991
Party	Candidate	Votes	%
Republican	E. Scott Garrett (incumbent)	31,174	39.6%
Republican	Dick Kamin (incumbent)	30,944	39.3%
Democratic	Michael J. Larose	13,106	16.7%
Populist	Stuart Bacha	1,957	2.5%
Populist	Compton C. Pakenham	1,523	1.9%
Total votes		78,704	100.0

== District 25 ==
=== General election ===
==== Candidates ====
- Arthur R. Albohn, incumbent Assembly member since 1980 (Republican)
- Rodney Frelinghuysen, incumbent Assembly member since 1984 (Republican)
- Ann Avram Humber (Democratic)
- Marc N. Pindus (Democratic)

==== Results ====
New Jersey general election, 1991
Party	Candidate	Votes	%
Republican	Rodney P. Frelinghuysen (incumbent)	31,792	37.2%
Republican	Arthur R. Albohn (incumbent)	29,461	34.5%
Democratic	Ann Avram Huber	12,822	15.0%
Democratic	Marc N. Pindus	11,405	13.3%
Total votes		85,480	100.0

== District 26 ==
=== General election ===
==== Candidates ====
- Alex DeCroce, incumbent Assembly member since 1989 (Republican)
- Richard Hrazanek (Populist)
- Robert Martin, incumbent Assembly member since 1985 (Republican)
- Patricia Pilson Scott (Democratic)
- Jerry Vitiello (Democratic)

==== Results ====
New Jersey general election, 1991
Party	Candidate	Votes	%
Republican	Robert J. Martin (incumbent)	32,337	37.6%
Republican	Alex DeCroce (incumbent)	32,303	37.6%
Democratic	Patricia Pilson Scott	10,363	12.1%
Democratic	Jerry Vitiello	9,809	11.4%
Populist	Richard Hrazanek	1,078	1.3%
Total votes		85,890	100.0

== District 27 ==
=== General election ===
==== Candidates ====
- Robert L. Brown (Democratic)
- Stephanie R. Bush, incumbent Assembly member since 1988 (Democratic)
- Dorcas O'Neal-Williams (Republican)
- Daniel L. Tindall Jr. (Direct Representative)

==== Results ====
New Jersey general election, 1991
Party	Candidate	Votes	%
Democratic	Stephanie R. Bush	18,308	38.0%
Democratic	Robert L. Brown	17,614	36.6%
Republican	Dorcas O’Neal-Williams	9,976	20.7%
Direct Representative	Daniel L. Tindall Jr.	2,247	4.7%
Total votes		48,145	100.0

== District 28 ==
=== General election ===
==== Candidates ====
- Consiglia Amato-DeMeo (Republican)
- Phyllis C. Cedola (Republican)
- Al Duncan (Socialist Workers)
- Marlene Karen Kopperud (Socialist Workers)
- Harry McEnroe, incumbent Assembly member since 1980 (Democratic)
- James Zangari, incumbent Assembly member since 1980 (Democratic)

==== Results ====
New Jersey general election, 1991
Party	Candidate	Votes	%
Democratic	Harry McEnroe (incumbent)	14,892	33.3%
Democratic	James Zangari (incumbent)	14,470	32.4%
Republican	Phyllis C. Cedola	6,933	15.5%
Republican	Consiglia Amato-DeMeo	6,903	15.5%
Socialist Workers	Al Duncan	762	1.7%
Socialist Workers	Marlene Karen Kopperud	694	1.6%
Total votes		44,654	100.0

== District 29 ==
=== General election ===
==== Candidates ====
- Delores W. Battle (Proven Leadership)
- Willie B. Brown, incumbent Assembly member since 1974 (Democratic)
- Kurt A. Culbreath (Republican)
- Don Mackle (Socialist Workers)
- Jackie Mattison, incumbent Assembly member since 1988 and chief of staff to Newark mayor Sharpe James (Democratic)
- Jason Redrup (Socialist Workers)
- Janie R. Thomas (Republican)

==== Results ====
New Jersey general election, 1991
Party	Candidate	Votes	%
Democratic	Willie B. Brown (incumbent)	12,519	36.4%
Democratic	Jackie R. Mattison	11,687	34.0%
Republican	Janie R. Thomas	4,008	11.7%
Republican	Kurt A. Culbreath	3,799	11.1%
Proven Leadership	Delores W. Battle	1,720	5.0%
Socialist Workers	Don Mackle	362	1.1%
Socialist Workers	Jason Redrup	274	0.8%
Total votes		34,369	100.0

== District 30 ==
=== General election ===
==== Candidates ====
- Ralph Adinolfe (Democratic)
- Melvin Cottrell, member of the Jackson Township Committee and former mayor (Republican)
- Robert W. Singer, former Assembly member and mayor of Lakewood (Republican)
- Michael G. Tamn (Democratic)

==== Results ====
New Jersey general election, 1991
Party	Candidate	Votes	%
Republican	Robert W. Singer	27,704	34.6%
Republican	Melvin Cottrell	26,553	33.1%
Democratic	Ralph Adinolfe	13,070	16.3%
Democratic	Michael G. Tamn	12,804	16.0%
Total votes		80,131	100.0

== District 31 ==
=== General election ===
==== Candidates ====
- Joseph Charles, incumbent Assembly member since 1982 (Democratic)
- Joseph Doria, Speaker of the New Jersey General Assembly and incumbent Assembly member since 1980 (Democratic)
- Michael D. Webb (Republican)
- James Patrick White (Republican)

==== Results ====
New Jersey general election, 1991
Party	Candidate	Votes	%
Democratic	Joseph V. Doria Jr. (incumbent)	17,189	28.8%
Democratic	Joseph Charles Jr. (incumbent)	17,047	28.5%
Republican	Michael D. Webb	12,881	21.6%
Republican	James Patrick White	12,596	21.1%
Total votes		59,713	100.0

== District 32 ==
=== General election ===
==== Candidates ====
- Gaston Delgado (Republican)
- Anthony Impreveduto, incumbent Assembly member since 1988 and member of the Secaucus Town Council (Democratic)
- David Kronick, incumbent Assembly member since 1988 (Democratic)
- Robert MacMillan

==== Results ====
New Jersey general election, 1991
Party	Candidate	Votes	%
Democratic	Anthony Impreveduto (incumbent)	20,911	29.0%
Democratic	David Kronick (incumbent)	19,764	27.5%
Republican	Robert MacMillan	14,536	20.2%
Republican	Gaston Delgado	14,145	19.6%
Politicians Are Crooks	Edith M. Shaw	1,360	1.9%
Politicians Are Crooks	Vivian L. Shaw	1,278	1.8%
Total votes		71,994	100.0

== District 33 ==
=== General election ===
==== Candidates ====
- A. Lazaro Guas (Republican)
- Bernard Kenny, incumbent Assembly member since 1988 (Democratic)
- Antonio Miguelez (Republican)
- Louis Romano, Memorial High School teacher (Democratic)

==== Results ====
New Jersey general election, 1991
Party	Candidate	Votes	%
Democratic	Bernard F. Kenny Jr. (incumbent)	18,522	34.5%
Democratic	Louis A. Romano	18,220	33.9%
Republican	Antonio Miguelez	8,558	15.9%
Republican	A. Lazaro Guas	8,435	15.7%
Total votes		53,735	100.0

== District 34 ==
=== General election ===
==== Candidates ====
- Marion Crecco, incumbent Assembly member since 1986 (Republican) (re-districted from 30th district)
- Sabina O'Brien (Democratic)
- Victor Rabbat (Democratic)
- Gerald H. Zecker, incumbent Assembly member since 1984 and former mayor of Clifton (Republican)

==== Results ====
New Jersey general election, 1991
Party	Candidate	Votes	%
Republican	Gerald H. Zecker (incumbent)	32,153	34.3%
Republican	Marion Crecco (incumbent)	32,014	34.1%
Democratic	Sabina O’Brien	14,914	15.9%
Democratic	Victor Rabbat	14,791	15.8%
Total votes		93,872	100.0

== District 35 ==
=== General election ===
==== Candidates ====
- Martin G. Barnes, member of the Paterson City Council (Republican)
- Eli M. Burgos
- Frank Catania, incumbent Assembly member since 1990 (Republican)
- Bill Pascrell, incumbent Assembly member since 1988 and mayor of Paterson (Democratic)

==== Results ====
New Jersey general election, 1991
Party	Candidate	Votes	%
Democratic	William J. Pascrell Jr. (incumbent)	17,394	28.8%
Republican	Frank Catania (incumbent)	14,894	24.7%
Democratic	Eli M. Burgos	14,266	23.6%
Republican	Martin G. Barnes	13,848	22.9%
Total votes		60,402	100.0

== District 36 ==
=== General election ===
==== Candidates ====
- Paul DiGaetano, member of the Passaic City Council and former Assembly member (Republican)
- Louis J. Gill, incumbent Assembly member since 1988 (Democratic)
- John V. Kelly, incumbent Assembly member since 1986 (Note: Kelly previously served in the Assembly from 1982 to 1984.) and mayor of Nutley (Republican) (re-districted from 30th district)
- Alfred R. Restiano (Democratic)

==== Results ====
New Jersey general election, 1991
Party	Candidate	Votes	%
Republican	John V. Kelly	24,356	30.1%
Republican	Paul DiGaetano	23,819	29.5%
Democratic	Alfred R. Restaino	16,366	20.2%
Democratic	Louis J. Gill (incumbent)	16,310	20.2%
Total votes		80,851	100.0

== District 37 ==
=== General election ===
==== Candidates ====
- Byron Baer, incumbent Assembly member since 1972 (Democratic)
- John Gramuglia (Independent)
- Joseph Marino (Independent)
- D. Bennett Mazur, incumbent Assembly member since 1982 (Democratic)
- Harvey Salb (Republican)
- John R. Smith (Republican)

==== Results ====
New Jersey general election, 1991
Party	Candidate	Votes	%
Democratic	D. Bennett Mazur (incumbent)	23,456	26.1%
Democratic	Byron Baer (incumbent)	23,308	25.9%
Republican	John R. Smith	20,601	22.9%
Republican	Harvey Salb	19,955	22.2%
Independent Party	Joseph Marino	1,417	1.6%
Independent Party	John Gramuglia	1,270	1.4%
Total votes		90,007	100.0

== District 38 ==
=== General election ===
==== Candidates ====
- Frank Biasco (Democratic)
- Thomas J. Duch, incumbent Assembly member since 1986 and former mayor of Garfield (Democratic) (re-districted from 36th district)
- Rose Marie Heck, incumbent Assembly member since January 1991 and mayor of Hasbrouck Heights (Republican)
- Patrick J. Roma, incumbent Assembly member since 1988 (Republican)

==== Results ====
New Jersey general election, 1991
Party	Candidate	Votes	%
Republican	Patrick J. Roma (incumbent)	31,958	32.0%
Republican	Rose Marie Heck (incumbent)	28,552	28.6%
Democratic	Frank Biasco	19,816	19.9%
Democratic	Thomas J. Duch	19,398	19.5%
Total votes		99,724	100.0

== District 39 ==
=== General election ===
==== Candidates ====
- Patricia Rainsford (Populist)
- Robert Reiss (Populist)
- John E. Rooney, incumbent Assembly member since 1983 and former mayor of Northvale (Republican)
- Andrew Vaccaro (Democratic)
- Charlotte Vandervalk, incumbent Assembly member since February 1991 and former Bergen County Freeholder (Republican)

==== Results ====
New Jersey general election, 1991
Party	Candidate	Votes	%
Republican	Charlotte Vandervalk (incumbent)	40,864	41.7%
Republican	John E. Rooney (incumbent)	37,573	38.3%
Democratic	Andrew Vaccaro	16,609	17.0%
Populist	Patricia Rainsford	1,498	1.5%
Populist	Robert Reiss	1,440	1.5%
Total votes		97,984	100.0

== District 40 ==
=== General election ===
==== Candidates ====
- William J. Branagh (Democratic)
- Martin Etler (Democratic)
- Nicholas Felice, incumbent Assembly member since 1982 (Republican)
- David C. Russo, incumbent Assembly member since 1990 (Republican)

==== Results ====
New Jersey general election, 1991
Party	Candidate	Votes	%
Republican	Nicholas R. Felice (incumbent)	36,573	38.3%
Republican	David C. Russo (incumbent)	35,650	37.4%
Democratic	William J. Branagh	11,741	12.3%
Democratic	Martin Etler	11,459	12.0%
Total votes		95,423	100.0

== See also ==
- 1991 New Jersey Senate election
