= 2000 American Samoa Republican presidential caucuses =

- February 26, 2000

4 delegates to the Republican National Convention
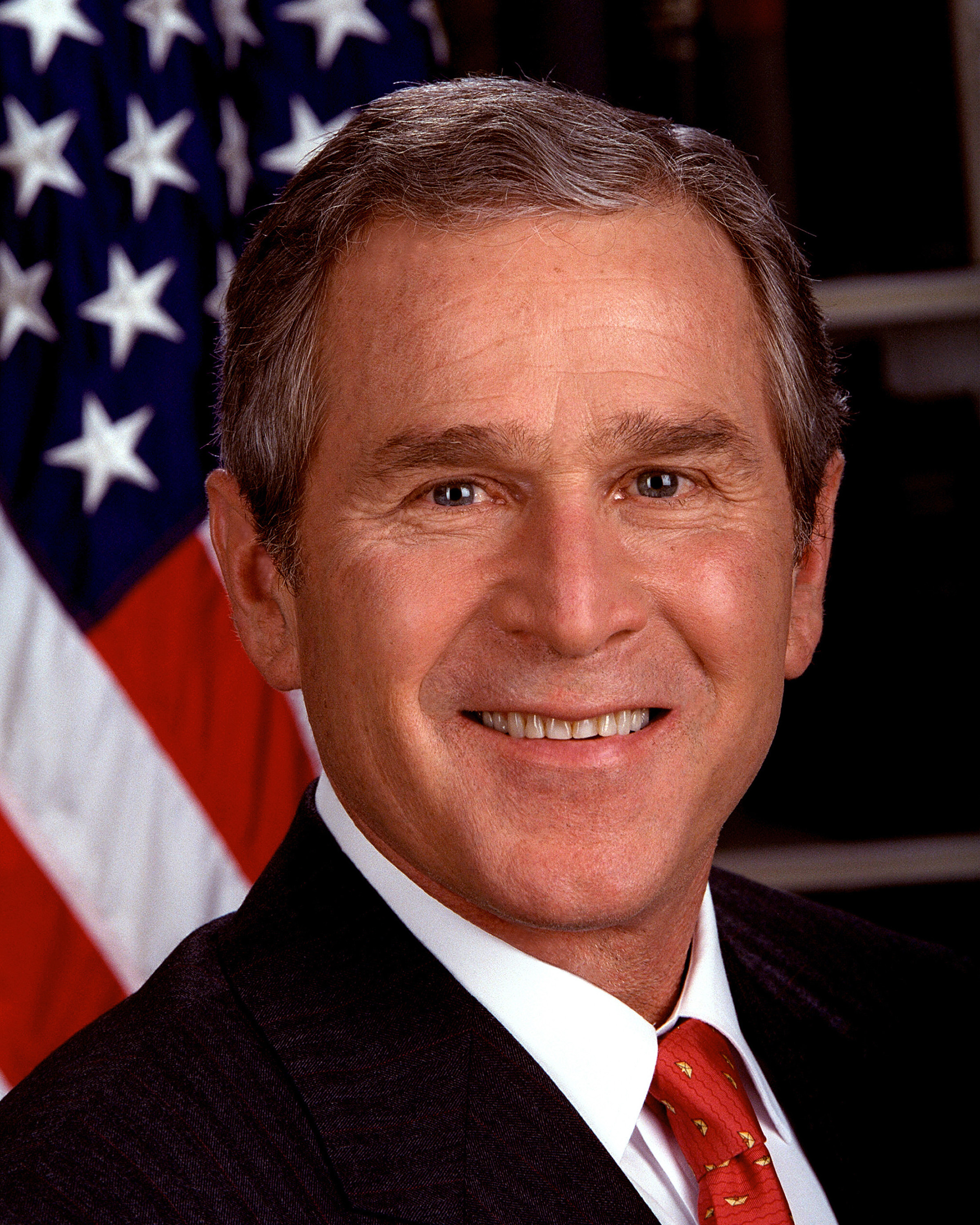
Candidate	George W. Bush
Home state	Texas
Delegate count	4
Percentage	100.00%

The 2000 American Samoa Republican presidential caucuses were held on February 26, 2000, as part of the 2000 Republican Party primaries for the 2000 presidential election. 4 delegates to the 2000 Republican National Convention were allocated to the presidential candidates, the contest was held alongside primaries in Guam and the Virgin Islands.

Texas Governor George W. Bush won by taking all the delegate votes, no other candidates appeared in the caucus.

== Procedure ==
American Samoa can only participate in Democratic and Republican primaries and caucuses and cannot participate in the presidential election because it is a U.S. territory and not a state, is it also illegal to take delegate votes from Electoral College votes like other territories.

== Candidates ==
The only candidate was Texas Governor George W. Bush.

== Results ==
Texas Governor George W. Bush was the only one on the ballot, so he took all the delegates without popular vote, no candidate was in the ballot.

American Samoa Republican caucus, February 26, 2000
Candidate	Votes	Percentage	Actual delegate count		
Candidate	Votes	Percentage	Bound	Unbound	Total
George W. Bush			4		4
Total:			4		4

== See also ==
- 2000 United States presidential election
- 2000 Democratic Party presidential primaries
- 2000 United States elections
- Elections in American Samoa
- 2000 American Samoa Democratic presidential caucuses
- 2000 American Samoa presidential caucuses
