= George E. Williams (New Jersey politician) =

American politician

Member of the New Jersey General Assembly from the 7th district
- In office January 11, 1994 – January 9, 1996 Serving with Steven M. Petrillo
- Preceded by: Priscilla B. Anderson; José F. Sosa
- Succeeded by: Diane Allen; Carmine DeSopo

Personal details
- Party: Democrat (until June 27, 1995); Republican

George E. Williams is an American politician who served in the New Jersey General Assembly from the 7th Legislative District from 1994 to 1996. Elected as a Democrat, Williams switched to the Republican Party while in office.

A graduate of Merchantville High School, Williams served on the Maple Shade Township Council from 1989 to 1997 and as the township's mayor for his final five years in office.

In the 1993 general election, Williams (with 30,896 votes) and his Democratic running mate Steven M. Petrillo (with 30,982) defeated Republican incumbents Priscilla B. Anderson (24,122) and José F. Sosa (24,354).

Criticizing the Democratic Party leadership in Camden County for snubbing his bid for re-nomination, Williams became a Republican on June 27, 1995.
