= 2000 American Samoa presidential caucuses =

2000 United States presidential caucuses in American Samoa
- 2000 American Samoa Democratic presidential caucuses
- March 7, 2000

6 delegates to the Democratic National Convention

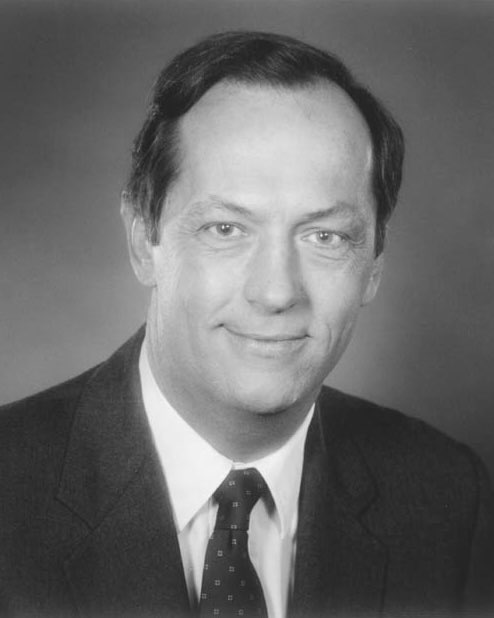
Candidate	Al Gore	Bill Bradley
Home state	Tennessee	New Jersey
Delegate count	2.5	0.5
Popular vote	21	4
Percentage	84%	16%
- 2000 American Samoa Republican presidential caucuses
- February 26, 2000

4 delegates to the Republican National Convention
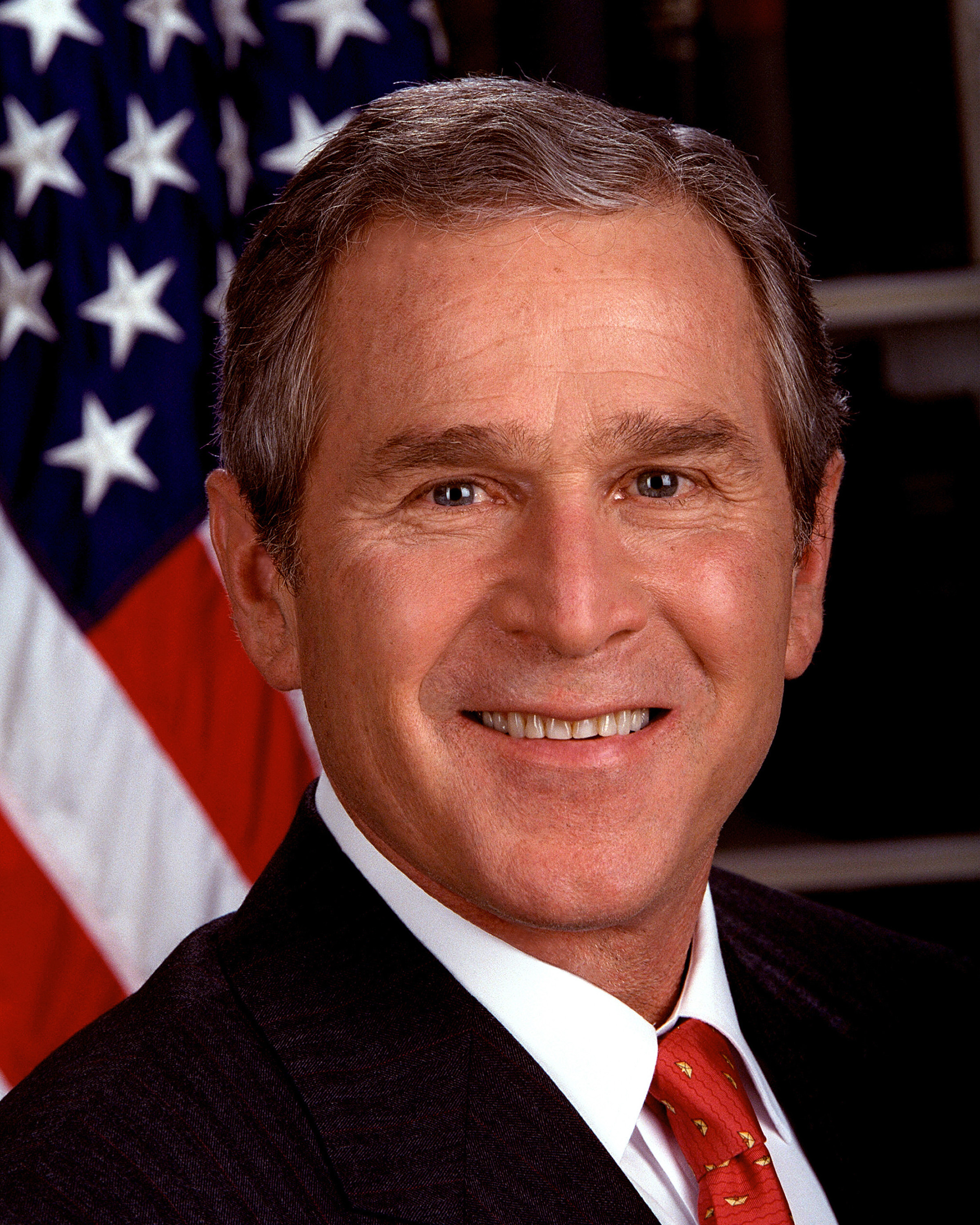
Candidate	George W. Bush
Home state	Texas
Delegate count	4
Percentage	100.00%

Although American Samoa will not participate in the 2000 presidential election because it is a U.S. territory and not a state, it participated in the U.S. presidential primaries and caucuses for both the Democratic and Republican parties.

== Democratic caucuses ==
The 2000 American Samoa Democratic presidential caucuses were held on March 7, 2000, as part of the 2000 Democratic Party primaries for the 2000 presidential election. 3 delegates to the 2000 Democratic National Convention were allocated to the presidential candidates, the contest was held on Super Tuesday alongside primaries and caucuses in 15 other states.

Vice President Al Gore won by 42% of the delegate votes and 84% of the popular votes also.

=== Procedure ===
The 2000 Democratic primaries were to nominate a candidate for the 2000 general election, but American Samoa did not participate in the 2000 presidential election because it is a U.S. territory and not a state, but it still can participate in the U.S. presidential primaries and caucuses and four other territories that could participate in the Democratic or Republican primaries. (Note: The other four was Virgin Islands, Guam, Northern Mariana Islands, and Puerto Rico.)

=== Candidates ===
The following candidates achieved on the ballot:

- Al Gore
- Bill Bradley
- Uncommitted (voting option)

=== Results ===
American Samoa Democratic caucus, March 7, 2000
Candidate	Votes	Percentage	Actual delegate count		
Candidate	Votes	Percentage	Bound	Unbound	Total
Al Gore	21	84%	2.5		2.5
Bill Bradley	4	16%	0.5		0.5
Uncommitted (voting option)			3		3
Total:	25	100%	6		6

== Republican caucuses ==
The 2000 American Samoa Republican presidential caucuses were held on February 26, 2000, as part of the 2000 Republican Party primaries for the 2000 presidential election. 4 delegates to the 2000 Republican National Convention were allocated to the presidential candidates, the contest was held alongside primaries in Guam and the Virgin Islands.

Texas Governor George W. Bush won by taking all the delegate votes, no other candidates appeared in the caucus.

=== Procedure ===
American Samoa can only participate in Democratic and Republican primaries and caucuses and cannot participate in the presidential election because it is a U.S. territory and not a state, is it also illegal to take delegate votes from Electoral College votes like other territories.

=== Candidates ===
There was only one candidate in here, Texas Governor George W. Bush.

=== Results ===
American Samoa Republican caucus, February 26, 2000
Candidate	Votes	Percentage	Actual delegate count		
Candidate	Votes	Percentage	Bound	Unbound	Total
George W. Bush			4		4
Total:			4		4

== See also ==
- 2000 Republican Party presidential primaries
- 2000 Democratic Party presidential primaries
- 2000 United States presidential election
- 2000 United States elections
- Elections in American Samoa
