= Steven M. Petrillo =

American politician (born 1958)

Member of the New Jersey General Assembly from the 7th district
- In office January 11, 1994 – January 9, 1996
- Preceded by: Priscilla B. Anderson; José F. Sosa
- Succeeded by: Diane Allen; Carmine DeSopo

Personal details
- Born: May 14, 1958 (age 66); Philadelphia, Pennsylvania
- Political party: Democratic

Steven M. Petrillo (born May 14, 1958) is an American Democratic Party politician who served in the New Jersey General Assembly from 1994 to 1996.

Born in Philadelphia in 1958, he grew up in Pennsauken Township and graduated from Pennsauken High School in 1976. He graduated from Dartmouth College in Hanover, New Hampshire, and Rutgers Law School in Camden and subsequently opened a private practice in his hometown.

Petrillo started his political career by being elected to the Pennsauken Township council in 1988 and serving as deputy mayor in 1991. He was also elected to the Camden County Board of Chosen Freeholders in 1992. In 1993, he ran in the Democratic primary for the two General Assembly seats up in the 7th Legislative District. He came in third place behind Jack Casey and George E. Williams. However, after Casey was named to replace the original Democratic primary winner for that district's state senate race, Petrillo was chosen to take Casey's place. Ultimately, Petrillo and Williams defeated incumbent Republicans Priscilla B. Anderson and José F. Sosa in the general election.

He served one term in the Assembly. In the 1995 elections, Petrillo and newcomer Joseph P. Dugan (after Williams lost Democratic organizational support and subsequently switched his registration to Republican) lost to Diane Allen and Carmine DeSopo. Both parties spent a total of $1.1 million, making it the most expensive race that year and the first legislative race in the state to surpass $1 million in spending.
