= Brokered convention =

When a political party fails to choose a nominee

In United States politics, a brokered convention (sometimes referred to as an open convention and closely related to a contested convention) occurs when no candidate is nominated on the first ballot of a party's nominating convention.

In many cases, delegates elected to a national, state or local convention through primaries or caucuses are pledged to vote for a particular candidate on the first ballot of the convention, meaning that the candidate with the necessary number of delegate pledges in advance of the convention is considered the presumptive nominee. However, if no candidate receives the necessary number of delegates' votes on the first ballot, the nomination is decided by the delegates through a process of bargaining and voting and the convention is then considered brokered. In that circumstance, all delegates are "released" from any obligation to support a particular candidate and may switch their allegiance to a different candidate before the next round of balloting. In some cases, delegates change their vote during the balloting roll call, resulting in a brokered convention where only one ballot is taken.

Brokered conventions have become rare following the decline of political machines and party bosses, and the advent of national primary campaigns and mass media. The term "contested" is a more modern term for a convention in which no candidate holds a majority.

== Specific party rules ==
=== Democratic Party ===
Under the Democratic National Convention rules, "A majority vote of the Convention's delegates shall be required to nominate the presidential candidate" and "Balloting will continue until a nominee is selected."

Superdelegates are unpledged party leaders who participate as delegates if no winner emerges after the first round. Before 2018, they were allowed to participate in the first round as well.

For the Democratic Party, unpledged delegate votes, also called "superdelegate votes", used to be counted on the first ballot. The term "brokered convention" has referred to a convention whose outcome is decided by superdelegate votes, rather than pledged delegates alone, but that is not the original sense of the term and has not been a commonly used definition for a "contested convention."

=== Republican Party ===
The rules are subject to change every election cycle and are determined by the Republican National Convention prior to the convention date. An example of this is Rule 40b of the RNC which was in effect in 2012, but was not adopted for the 2016 convention in Cleveland. Under this rule, a candidate must have the support of a majority of the delegates of at least eight states in order to get the nomination. Rule 40e then states that if no candidate has received the majority of votes, "the chairman of the convention shall direct the roll of the states be called again and shall repeat the calling of the roll until a candidate shall have received a majority of the votes."

== Presidential history ==
At the presidential level, the 1952 Democratic National Convention and 1952 Republican National Convention are the most recent brokered conventions by the two major American political parties. (Note: Dwight D. Eisenhower had 595 delegates out of 1,206 in the first roll call of the 1952 Republican National Convention, nine short of the majority required; some delegates changed their votes before the official vote could be declared, resulting in Eisenhower's nomination on what was technically the first ballot.) All subsequent presidential nominations have been decided on the first ballot of the respective convention, and the result is typically clear in advance of the convention.

However, before the widespread adoption of presidential primary elections, political party conventions were routinely brokered. In particular, the Democratic Party required a two-thirds majority of delegate votes from their first convention in 1832 until 1936. This requirement increased the probability of a brokered convention, and conventions were routinely decided only after multiple ballots. At the 1924 Democratic National Convention, divisions between the anti-prohibition "wets" and the pro-prohibition "dries" led to a 102-ballot deadlock over 17 days between the frontrunners, Alfred E. Smith and William G. McAdoo. John W. Davis was chosen as a compromise on the 103rd ballot.

== Reasons for rarity ==
Several factors encourage a clear and timely decision in the primary process.

Firstly, candidates tend to get momentum as they go through the process because of the bandwagon effect. Thus, one or two candidates will be portrayed by the media to voters as the frontrunners as a result of their placement in the first primaries and caucuses, and as also-ran candidates drop out, their supporters will tend to vote for one of the frontrunners. Theorists have identified two types of political momentum, piecemeal and all-at-once, with different impacts on front-runners and those right behind them.

Secondly, political parties wish to avoid the negative publicity from a brokered convention and to maximize the amount of time that the nominee has to campaign for the presidency.

Especially because of the desire to foster party unity in the months leading up to Election Day, it is considered possible, if not probable, for any "brokering" that may be required for a future presidential convention to take place in the weeks and months before the convention, once it becomes clear that no candidate will likely secure a majority of delegates without an agreement with one or more rivals. Such an agreement would likely commit the frontrunner to make some form of one or multiple concessions in return, such as selecting the former rival as their vice presidential nominee. That was the case prior to the 1980 Republican National Convention. Former California Governor Ronald Reagan won the presidential nomination and chose George H. W. Bush as his vice-presidential nominee although President Gerald Ford was the frontrunner for the slot.

== In popular culture ==
=== Film ===
The 1964 film The Best Man, based on a play of the same name, centers on the actions of two presidential candidates vying for an unspecified political party's nomination leading up to and during a brokered convention.

=== Television ===
- In the U.S. edition of House of Cards, two episodes of the fourth season center on an open Democratic National Convention, at which the vice-presidential nomination is contested between Secretary of State Catherine Durant and First Lady Claire Underwood.
- The final two episodes of season six of The West Wing center on a brokered convention for the presidential nomination.
- In the final season of Veep, Selina Meyer wins the nomination at a brokered convention after a series of compromising decisions.

== See also ==
- List of Democratic Party presidential primaries
- Democratic National Convention
- List of Republican Party presidential primaries
- Republican National Convention
