= 2000 Guam Democratic presidential caucuses =

- March 18, 2000

6 delegates to the Democratic National Convention

Candidate	Al Gore	Uncommitted (voting option)
Home state	Tennessee	n/a
Delegate count	3	3
Percentage	50.0%	50.0%

The 2000 Guam Democratic presidential caucuses were held on March 18, 2000, as part of the 2000 Democratic Party primaries for the 2000 presidential election. 6 delegates to the 2000 Democratic National Convention were allocated to the presidential candidates.

The totals of the vote were equal since Vice President Al Gore and Uncommitted received each other 3 delegate votes. The percentage was 50.0%.

== Procedure ==
Although Guam will not participate in the 2000 presidential election because it is a U.S. territory and not a state, it can participate in the U.S. presidential primaries and caucuses for both the Democratic and Republican parties, also Guam instead uses the presidential straw poll on Election Day.

== Results ==
Guam Democratic caucus, March 18, 2000
Candidate	Votes	Percentage	Actual delegate count		
Candidate	Votes	Percentage	Bound	Unbound	Total
Al Gore			3		3
Uncommitted (voting option)			3		3
Total:			6		6

== See also ==
- 2000 United States presidential election
- 2000 Democratic Party presidential primaries
- 2000 Republican Party presidential primaries
- United States presidential straw polls in Guam
- 2000 Guam Republican presidential caucuses
- 2000 Guam presidential caucuses
