= 2000 Guam Republican presidential caucuses =

- February 26, 2000

4 delegates to the Republican National Convention
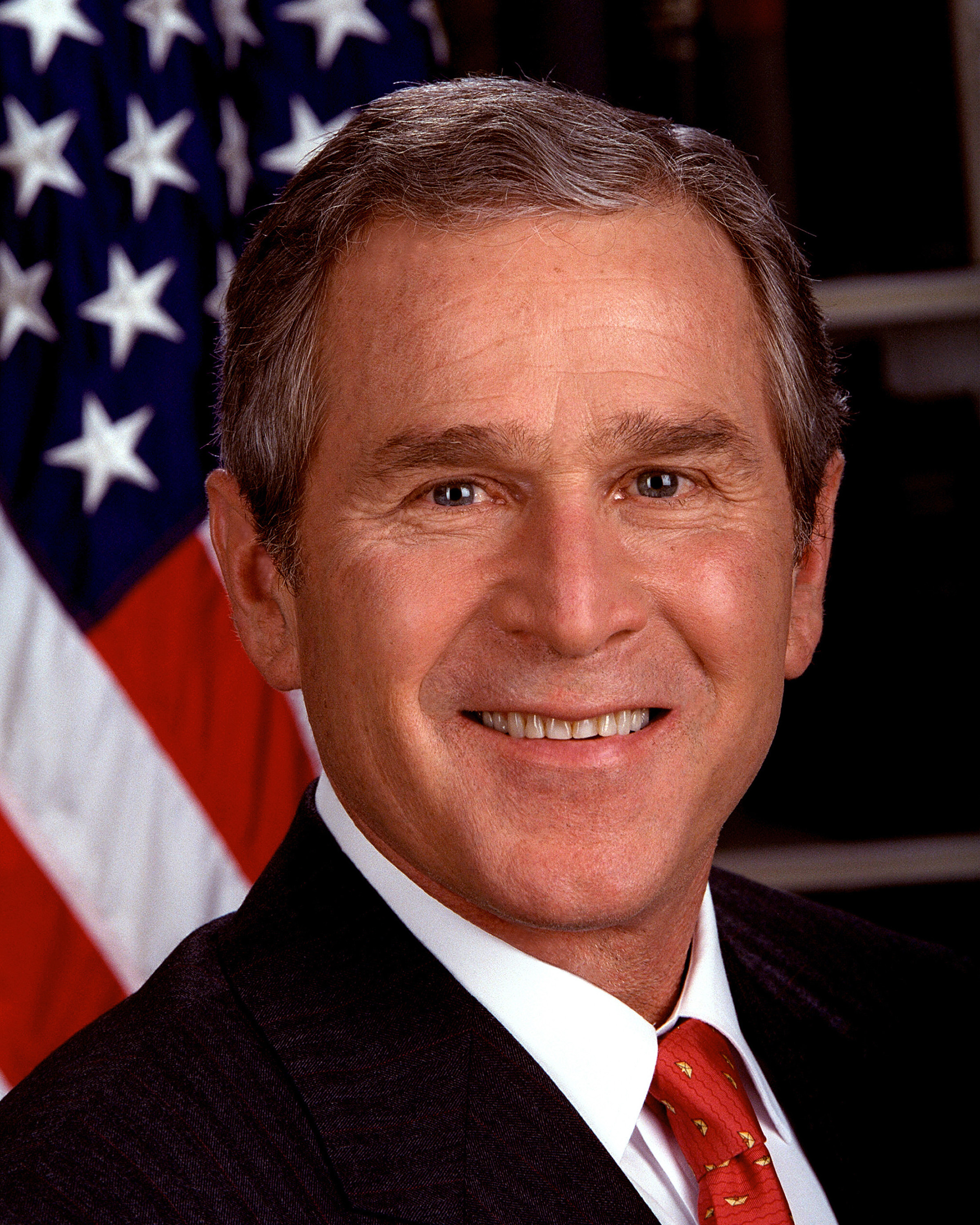
Candidate	George W. Bush
Home state	Texas
Delegate count	4
Percentage	100.00%

The 2000 Guam Republican presidential caucuses were held on February 26, 2000, as part of the 2000 Republican Party primaries for the 2000 presidential election. 4 delegates to the 2000 Republican National Convention were allocated to the presidential candidates. The contest was alongside primaries in American Samoa and Virgin Islands.

== Procedure ==
Although Guam did not participate in the 2000 presidential election because it is a U.S. territory and not a state, it can participate in the U.S. presidential primaries and caucuses for both the Democratic and Republican parties. Guam instead uses the presidential straw poll on Election Day.

== Results ==
Guam Republican caucus, February 26, 2000
Candidate	Votes	Percentage	Actual delegate count		
Candidate	Votes	Percentage	Bound	Unbound	Total
George W. Bush			4		4
Total:			4		4

== See also ==
- 2000 United States presidential election
- 2000 Democratic Party presidential primaries
- 2000 Republican Party presidential primaries
- United States presidential straw polls in Guam
- 2000 Guam Democratic presidential caucuses
- 2000 Guam presidential caucuses
