= Diane Allen =

American politician (born 1948)

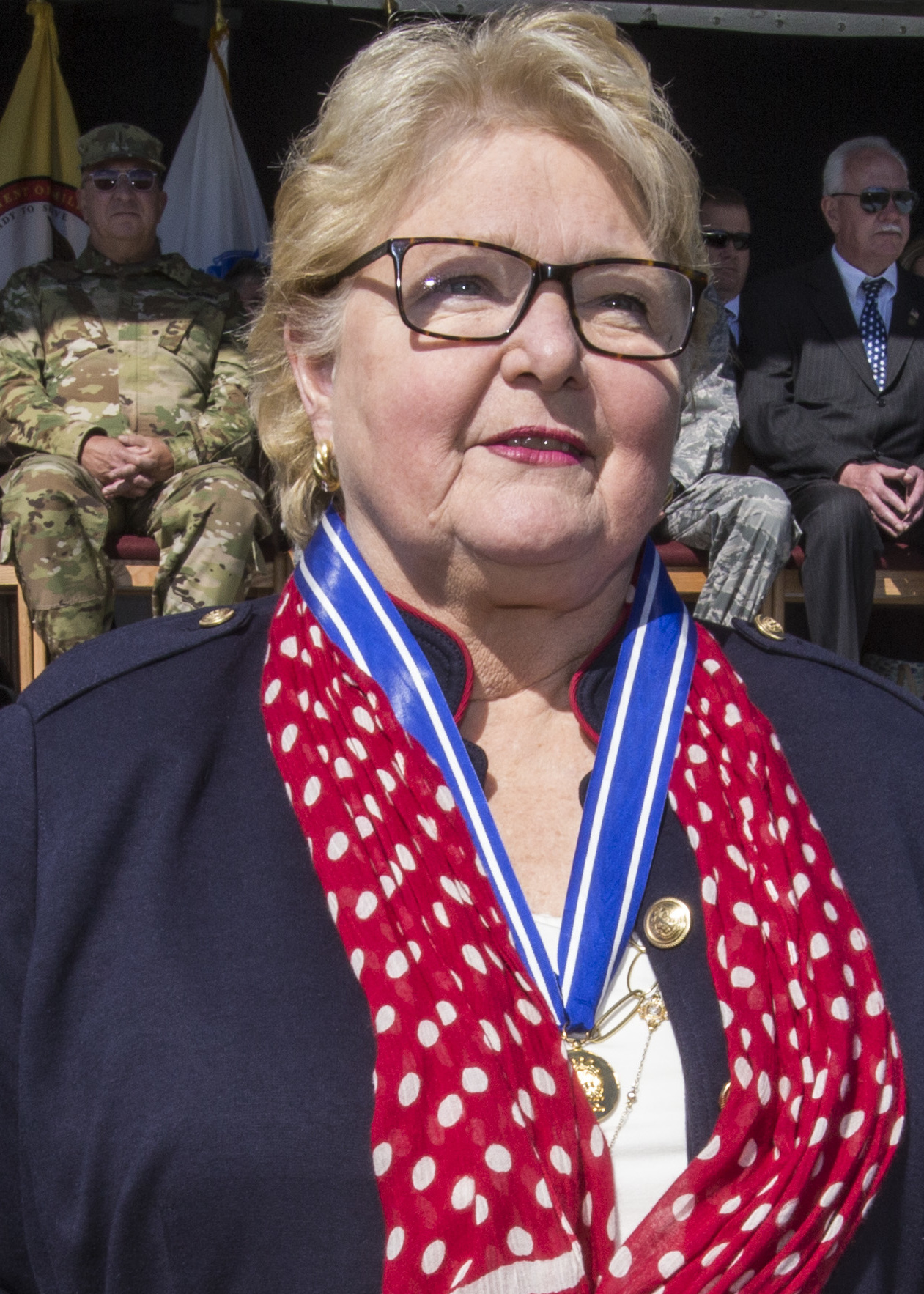
- Allen in 2017

Member of the New Jersey Senate from the 7th district
- In office January 13, 1998 – January 9, 2018
- Preceded by: Jack Casey
- Succeeded by: Troy Singleton

Member of the New Jersey General Assembly from the 7th district
- In office January 9, 1996 – January 13, 1998 Serving with Carmine DeSopo
- Preceded by: Steven M. Petrillo; George Williams
- Succeeded by: Herb Conaway; Jack Conners

Personal details
- Born: March 8, 1948 (age 78) Newark, New Jersey, U.S.
- Party: Republican
- Spouse: Sam
- Children: 2
- Education: Bucknell University (BA)

Diane B. Allen (born March 8, 1948) is an American politician and television journalist. A member of the Republican Party, she represented the 7th legislative district in the New Jersey Assembly from 1996 to 1998 and New Jersey Senate from 1998 to 2018. Allen was the senate majority whip from 1998 to 2001, deputy Republican conference leader from 2002 to 2003, and later deputy minority leader. In 2002, she was an unsuccessful candidate for United States Senate, finishing second in the Republican primary.

Allen was the Republican nominee for lieutenant governor in 2021 after Jack Ciattarelli announced she had agreed to join his ticket. The pair narrowly lost the general election to the incumbent Democratic ticket of Phil Murphy and Sheila Oliver.

== Early life ==
Allen grew up in Moorestown, New Jersey and graduated as the valedictorian of the Moorestown High School class of 1966.

In 1969, Allen was crowned Miss Burlington County.

Allen received a Bachelor of Arts in philosophy from Bucknell University.

In 1973, Allen won a national hang gliding competition.

== Broadcasting career ==
Allen began her broadcast news career in 1970 with WJJZ, an AM radio station based in Mount Holly, New Jersey. She worked at the New Jersey Network before joining an ABC affiliate in Chicago.

In 1976, Allen returned home to cover New Jersey politics for KYW-TV, the then-NBC (now CBS) affiliate in Philadelphia. In 1985, she co-moderated the New Jersey gubernatorial debate between Governor Thomas Kean and Peter Shapiro. She left the network in 1988 and later won a lawsuit against CBS for discriminatory practices.

In 1989, she joined WCAU, the then-CBS (now NBC) affiliate in Philadelphia, and remained there until 1994.

In 2000, Allen briefly served as an interim anchor for CN8 while another anchorwoman was on vacation. This prompted criticism from Senate Minority Leader Richard Codey, who criticized her for conducting her duties as an officeholder while reporting on politics.

Allen is the president of VidComm, Inc., a media production company she founded after her broadcasting career ended.

=== Accolades ===
During her career, Allen won eight Daytime Emmy Awards. The Broadcast Pioneers of Philadelphia inducted Allen into their Hall of Fame in 2005.

== Political career ==
Allen first sought elective office in the 1970s when she ran for the Board of Education of the Moorestown Township Public Schools.

=== New Jersey Assembly ===
==== 1995 election ====
Allen was recruited to state politics by Burlington County Republican chair Glenn Paulsen, who asked her to run for Assembly in 1995 to set up a 1997 campaign for State Senate. In the 1995 general election, Allen and Republican running mate Carmine DeSopo were elected over Democratic incumbent Steven M. Petrillo and his running mate, newcomer Joseph P. Dugan. The $1.1 million spent in the 1995 Assembly race made it the first in New Jersey to cross the $1 million spending mark.

=== New Jersey Senate ===
==== Elections ====
In 1997, Allen announced her campaign for Senate as expected. Incumbent Democrat Jack Casey announced late that he would not to stand for re-election, citing health complications; Allen defeated Democratic nominee Robert P. Broderick with 54% of the vote.

Despite her district's solid Democratic lean—during her entire twenty-year tenure, her district never elected one of her Republican running mates to the Assembly—Allen consistently won re-election with little trouble.

In 2001, Allen defeated U.S. Navy SEAL reservist Louis Gallagher with 54% of the vote. Gallagher was called up for active duty late in the race following the September 11 attacks, and Allen debated his wife instead.

In 2003, Allen defeated Diane F. Gabriel with 60% of the vote.

In 2007, Allen defeated Rich Dennison of Florence with 56% of the vote.

In 2011, Allen defeated a primary challenge from Carol Lokan-Moore with 90% of the vote and won the general election against Gail Cook with 57%.

In 2013, Allen defeated Gary Catrambone with 60% of the vote.

==== Tenure ====
Throughout her career in the Senate, Allen was an advocate for stricter enforcement of discrimination and workplace harassment restrictions. During her final year in office, Allen worked to override Governor Chris Christie's veto of an equal pay law. Three months after she left office, new governor Phil Murphy signed the Diane B. Allen Equal Pay Act, which he said, "cement[ed Allen's] legacy as a lawmaker who worked across the aisle to do the right things for our state.”

In addition to her work on women's equality, Allen authored the NJSAVER rebate plan and sponsored legislation assisting senior citizens in doubling their Homestead Rebate checks.

In November 2013, Allen was elected Chair of the National Foundation for Women Legislators. The organization represents the near 1800 female state legislators in America, and supports elected women from all levels of governance.

After leaving office, Allen founded a political action committee dedicated to encouraging women to run for public office on a non-partisan basis.

=== 2002 United States Senate campaign ===
In 2002, Allen ran to unseat Democratic U.S. Senator Robert Torricelli. Early in the race, the favorite was Jim Treffinger, who had run in 2000. However, Treffinger was forced to drop out under an ethics cloud after the FBI raided his Newark office. The party leadership coalesced behind Doug Forrester, a multimillionaire businessman who pledged to personally fund his campaign.

During the primary, Allen was endorsed by The New York Times. She faced criticism from fellow Republicans for her Quaker faith and pacifism, which conflicted with the national mood following the September 11 attacks.

Allen finished a close second to Forrester, who won the primary with 44.6% of the vote to Allen's 36.9%. She carried every county in South Jersey except for Gloucester, home of third-place finisher State Senator John J. Matheussen, and Ocean. Forrester lost the general election to Frank Lautenberg, who entered the race after Torricelli withdrew amid ethics concerns and poor polling.

=== Other offices ===
Senator Allen has served as a delegate to the Republican National Convention in 1996, 2000, as well as in 2004 and 2012.

In 2008, Allen was a leading candidate to succeed Jim Saxton in the U.S. House. However, she announced on November 29, 2007 that she would not run for the seat, citing factionalism in the Burlington County Republican Party.

In 2009, Allen was a leading candidate to join Chris Christie's ticket as the Republican nominee for lieutenant governor. Christie ultimately chose Monmouth County Sheriff Kim Guadagno instead.

=== 2021 lieutenant gubernatorial campaign ===
Republican nominee for Governor Jack Ciattarelli announced his selection of Allen as his running mate on August 4, 2021. Allen was an early supporter of Ciattarelli's campaign and supervised his campaign's anti-harassment policies. The pair lost the general election to the incumbent Democratic ticket of Phil Murphy and Sheila Oliver.

=== Election results ===
1995 New Jersey Assembly election
Party	Candidate	Votes	%
Republican	Diane Allen	22,242	27.7
Republican	Carmine de Sopo	20,480	25.5
Democratic	Steven M. Petrillo (incumbent)	17,129	21.3
Democratic	Joseph P. Dugan	17,014	21.2
Independent	George Guzdek	1,188	1.5
Independent	Susan Normandin	453	0.5
Independent	Charles L. Normandin	314	0.4
Independent	Dixie Lee Patterson	1,386	1.7
Republican gain from Democratic			

New Jersey State Senate elections, 1997
Party	Candidate	Votes	%
Republican	Diane Allen (incumbent)	30,875	53.7
Democratic	Robert P. Broderick	25,501	44.3
Independent	Norman E. Wahner	1,121	2.0
Republican gain from Democratic			

New Jersey State Senate elections, 2001
Party	Candidate	Votes	%
Republican	Diane Allen (incumbent)	29,756	54.1
Democratic	Lou Gallagher	25,293	45.9
Republican hold			

New Jersey State Senate elections, 2003
Party	Candidate	Votes	%
Republican	Diane Allen (incumbent)	26,331	60.3
Democratic	Diane F. Gabriel	17,331	39.7
Republican hold			

New Jersey State Senate elections, 2007
Party	Candidate	Votes	%
Republican	Diane Allen (incumbent)	23,185	55.6
Democratic	Richard S. Dennison, Jr.	18,511	44.4
Republican hold			

New Jersey State Senate primary elections, 2011
Party	Candidate	Votes	%
Republican	Diane Allen (incumbent)	3,904	90.4
Republican	Carol M. Lokan-Moore	416	9.6
Republican hold			

New Jersey State Senate elections, 2011
Party	Candidate	Votes	%
Republican	Diane Allen (incumbent)	27,011	57.0
Democratic	Gail Cook	20,370	43.0
Republican hold			

New Jersey State Senate elections, 2013
Party	Candidate	Votes	%
Republican	Diane Allen (incumbent)	38,350	60.4
Democratic	Gary Catrambone	25,106	39.6
Republican hold			

== Personal life ==
As of 2021, Allen and her husband, Sam, live in Edgewater Park Township. They have two children. Her husband is the great-grandson of Samuel Leeds Allen, the inventor of the Flexible Flyer sled.

She is a Quaker. Allen and her husband are members of Mt. Laurel Friends Meeting and Moorestown Friends Meeting, where she currently serves on the Ministry Committee.

In addition to her hang gliding and beauty pageant career, Allen is a judoka, national swimming champion, pilot, and sharpshooter.

=== Health ===
On November 9, 2009, Allen announced that she had been diagnosed with an aggressive form of oral cancer. Though doctors had initially thought that treatment would require removal of her tongue and that she would be unable to speak normally, surgery performed in 2010 did not greatly impair her speech, and she has since undergone radiation and laser treatments.

Party political offices
Preceded by Carlos Rendo	Republican nominee for Lieutenant Governor of New Jersey; 2021	Succeeded by Jim Gannon
