= Burlington County Special Services School District =

School district in New Jersey, U.S.

Burlington County Special Services District

Address
- 20 Pioneer Boulevard Westampton, Burlington County, New Jersey, 08060; United States
- Coordinates: 40.0146°N 74.8190°W

District information
- Grades: Special svc.
- Superintendent: Ashanti Holley
- Business administrator: Andrew C. Willmott
- Schools: 2

Students and staff
- Enrollment: 455 (as of 2023–24)
- Faculty: 101.0 FTEs
- Student–teacher ratio: 4.5:1

Other information
- Website: www.bcsssd.k12.nj.us
Ind.	Per pupil	District spending	Rank (*)	Special svc. average	%± vs. average
1A	Total Spending	$58,603	5	$18,891	210.2%
1	Budgetary Cost	60,381	6	57,252	5.5%
2	Classroom Instruction	36,289	7	32,861	10.4%
6	Support Services	10,702	5	11,945	−10.4%
8	Administrative Cost	5,888	6	5,725	2.8%
10	Operations & Maintenance	6,536	6	6,215	5.2%
13	Extracurricular Activities	311	3	195	59.5%
16	Median Teacher Salary	75,810	4	77,183
Data from NJDoE 2014 Taxpayers' Guide to Education Spending. *Of Special svc. districts with any number of students. Lowest spending=1; Highest=8

The Burlington County Special Services School District is a special education public school district headquartered in Westampton, in Burlington County, in the U.S. state of New Jersey, whose schools offer educational and therapeutic services for students of elementary and high school age from across the county who have emotional of physical disabilities that cannot be addressed by their sending districts.

As of the 2023–24 school year, the district, comprised of two schools, had an enrollment of 455 students and 101.0 classroom teachers (on an FTE basis), for a student–teacher ratio of 4.5:1.

== History ==
The Burlington County Special Services School District was established in 1972 by the Burlington County Board of Chosen Freeholders. At first the district served 30 disabled students, but grew within five years to accommodate 500 students from 40 sending school districts in the county. A newly constructed campus for the school was built in Westampton, completed in 1982 and starting use in January 1983. In 1990, the district opened a high school for at-risk students in Lumberton Township and a K-8 campus was opened the following year in Willingboro Township to help teach students how to overcome their disabilities.

A group of emotionally and physically disabled students from the school district's marching band participated in the inaugural parade for President Bill Clinton. The band also marched in the parade in Atlantic City, New Jersey for the 1993 Miss America pageant.

Saying that he "didn't even know it was a paying job" when he was elected to the Assembly in 1995, Superintendent Carmine DeSopo announced in 1996 that he would donate his entire $35,000 annual salary from the Assembly to the school district's marching band and to a camp the district operated for adult graduates. Having been responsible for the creation of the district, DeSopo announced in March 2001 that he was retiring at the end of the school year from his position as superintendent after 38 years in the field of education.

== Schools ==
Schools in the district (with 2023–24 enrollment data from the National Center for Education Statistics) are:

Comprehensive program

- Main Campus at Westampton with 399 students in grades PreK–12
  - Dennis Leigh, principal
- Transitions at BCSSSD
  - Mary Jean Kneringer, principal
- Burlington County Alternative School at Mount Laurel with 56 students in grades 6–12
  - Joan Barbagiovanni, principal

== Administration ==
Core members of the district's administration are:

- Ashanti Holley, superintendent
- Andrew C. Willmott, business administrator and board secretary

== Board of education ==
The district's board of education sets policy and oversee the fiscal and educational operation of the district through its administration. The board is composed of seven members, the county superintendent of schools, who serves on an ex officio basis, and six members who are appointed by the Burlington County Board of County Commissioners to three-year terms of office on a staggered basis, with two member terms up for reappointment and expiring each year. The board appoints a superintendent to oversee the district's day-to-day operations and a business administrator to supervise the business functions of the district.
