= 2000 Guam presidential caucuses =

2000 United States presidential caucuses in American Samoa
- 2000 Guam Democratic presidential caucuses
- March 18, 2000

6 delegates to the Democratic National Convention

Candidate	Al Gore	Uncommitted (voting option)
Home state	Tennessee	n/a
Delegate count	3	3
Percentage	50.0%	50.0%
- 2000 Guam Republican presidential caucuses
- February 26, 2000

4 delegates to the Republican National Convention
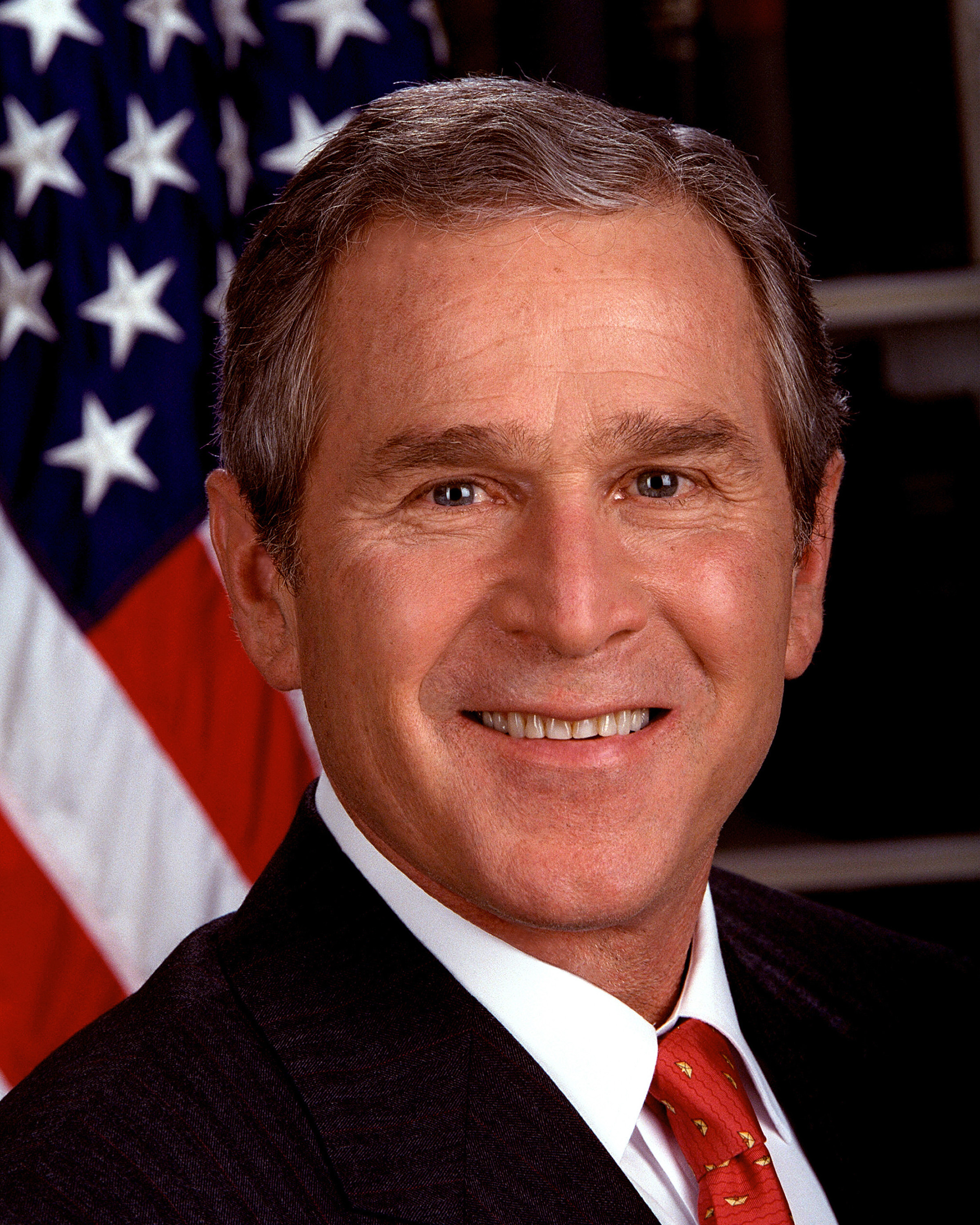
Candidate	George W. Bush
Home state	Texas
Delegate count	4
Percentage	100.00%

Although Guam will not participate in the 2000 presidential election because it is a U.S. territory and not a state, it can participate in the U.S. presidential primaries and caucuses for both the Democratic and Republican parties, also Guam instead uses the presidential straw poll on Election Day.

== Democratic caucuses ==
The 2000 Guam Democratic presidential caucuses were held on March 18, 2000, as part of the 2000 Democratic Party primaries for the 2000 presidential election. 6 delegates to the 2000 Democratic National Convention were allocated to the presidential candidates.

The totals of the vote were equal since Vice President Al Gore and Uncommitted received each other 3 delegate votes. The percentage was 50.0%.

=== Procedure ===
Although Guam will not participate in the 2000 presidential election because it is a U.S. territory and not a state, it can participate in the U.S. presidential primaries and caucuses for both the Democratic and Republican parties, also Guam instead uses the presidential straw poll on Election Day.

=== Results ===
Guam Democratic caucus, March 18, 2000
Candidate	Votes	Percentage	Actual delegate count		
Candidate	Votes	Percentage	Bound	Unbound	Total
Al Gore			3		3
Uncommitted (voting option)			3		3
Total:			6		6

== Republican caucuses ==
The 2000 Guam Republican presidential caucuses were held on February 26, 2000, as part of the 2000 Republican Party primaries for the 2000 presidential election. 4 delegates to the 2000 Republican National Convention were allocated to the presidential candidates. The contest was alongside primaries in American Samoa and Virgin Islands.

=== Procedure ===
Although Guam will not participate in the 2000 presidential election because it is a U.S. territory and not a state, it can participate in the U.S. presidential primaries and caucuses for both the Democratic and Republican parties, also Guam instead uses the presidential straw poll on Election Day.

=== Results ===
Guam Republican caucus, February 26, 2000
Candidate	Votes	Percentage	Actual delegate count		
Candidate	Votes	Percentage	Bound	Unbound	Total
George W. Bush			4		4
Total:			4		4

== See also ==
- 2000 Republican Party presidential primaries
- 2000 Democratic Party presidential primaries
- 2000 United States presidential election
- 2000 United States elections
- United States presidential straw polls in Guam
