= Priscilla B. Anderson =

American politician

Member of the New Jersey General Assembly from the 7th district
- In office January 14, 1992 – January 11, 1994
- Preceded by: Jack Casey; Barbara Kalik
- Succeeded by: Steven M. Petrillo; George E. Williams

Personal details
- Born: September 14, 1935 (age 90) Philadelphia, Pennsylvania
- Party: Republican (since 1991)
- Other political affiliations: Democratic (until 1991)

Priscilla B. Anderson (born September 14, 1935) is an American politician who served in the New Jersey General Assembly from the 7th Legislative District from 1992 to 1994.

Anderson was born and grew up in Philadelphia. After graduating from Trenton State College with a bachelors and a master's degree in education, she worked as a teacher and guidance counselor in the Trenton Public Schools. She was elected to the Willingboro Township council in 1981 and served until her election to the Assembly. In 1984 and 1991, she served as the mayor of the township. She was a Democrat until 1991 when she switched to the Republican Party.

She was elected to the General Assembly in 1991 when she and her running mate José F. Sosa defeated Democratic incumbents Jack Casey and Barbara Kalik in the aftermath of Governor James Florio's tax increases. Anderson was the first African American elected to the state legislature from Burlington County. In the 1993 election, the Democratic challengers Steven M. Petrillo and George E. Williams accused Anderson of double dipping for pulling a salary from the Trenton Public Schools for her guidance councilor work and from the legislature. Both Anderson and Sosa were defeated by both Democrats in the election.

Following her term in the Assembly, Anderson would later serve as a commissioner on the Burlington County Bridge Commission.
