= Carmine DeSopo =

American politician

Carmine DeSopo (born November 1, 1940) is an American Republican Party politician who served one term in the New Jersey General Assembly, from 1996 to 1998, where he represented the 7th Legislative District.

== Education ==
DeSopo earned bachelor's degree in 1964 and a master's degree in 1967, both with a major in education, at William Paterson College in Wayne, New Jersey. He earned a Ph.D. in administration from Nova University. He was the long-time Superintendent of the Burlington County Special Services School District. William Paterson University recognized DeSopo as one of its Distinguished Alumni Award honorees in 1975.

== Superintendent ==
While DeSopo was superintendent, a group of emotionally and physically disabled students from the Burlington County Special Services School District marched in the inaugural parade for President Bill Clinton. The band also marched in the parade in Atlantic City, New Jersey for the 1993 Miss America pageant. Saying that he "didn't even know it was a paying job" when he was elected to the Assembly, DeSopo announced in 1996 that he would donate his entire $35,000 annual salary from the Assembly to the school district's marching band and to a camp the district runs for adult graduates. Having been responsible for the creation of the district, DeSopo announced in March 2001 that he was retiring at the end of the school year from his position as superintendent after 38 years in the field of education DeSopo was the target of an investigation into his use of school district employees to perform work on his home in Westampton Township, New Jersey and a Long Beach Island vacation property.

== General Assembly ==
In the 1995 general election, DeSopo and Republican running mate Diane Allen were elected, defeating Democratic incumbent Steven M. Petrillo and his running mate, newcomer Joseph P. Dugan. The $1.1 million spent in the 1995 Assembly race made it the first in New Jersey to cross the $1 million spending mark, as reported in the results of a study conducted by the Center for the Analysis of Public Issues of Princeton, New Jersey that analyzed campaign finance reports from candidates for all 80 Assembly seats.

DeSopo served in the General Assembly as Vice-Chair of the Community Services Committee and as a member of the Judiciary Committee.

New Jersey General Assembly
Preceded by Steven M. Petrillo; George Williams	Member of the New Jersey General Assembly from the 7th district 1996–1998; Served alongside: Diane Allen	Succeeded by Herb Conaway; Jack Conners
