= List of Republican Party presidential primaries =

Nomination process for a U.S. presidential candidate

Presidential primaries have been held in the United States since 1912 to nominate the Republican presidential candidate.

== 1912 ==
This was the first time that candidates were chosen through primaries. President William Taft ran to become the nominee and faced the opposition of former President Theodore Roosevelt. Roosevelt won most of the states and received more than half of the popular vote. He even defeated Taft in his home state of Ohio. However, Taft received more delegates than Roosevelt and thus was nominated during the convention. Roosevelt founded a new party, the Progressive Party, and challenged Taft and the Democratic nominee Woodrow Wilson in the general election. Wilson won the election, gaining a large majority in the Electoral College and winning 42% of the popular vote, while Roosevelt won 27% and Taft 23%.

See also

- 1912 United States presidential election
- 1912 Republican National Convention

== 1916 ==
Pennsylvania Governor Martin Brumbaugh, Senator Albert Cummins of Iowa and former Vice President Charles Fairbanks were the main candidates. Henry Ford and former President Theodore Roosevelt were also candidates. However Associate Justice of the Supreme Court of the United States Charles Hughes won the nomination on the third ballot at the convention. Hughes lost the general election to President Wilson.

See also

- 1916 United States presidential election
- 1916 Republican National Convention

== 1920 ==
Governor Hiram Johnson of California and Former Chief of Staff of the United States Army Leonard Wood were the main candidates. However Senator Warren Harding of Ohio managed to win the nomination on the tenth ballot at the convention. Harding easily won the election against Democratic candidate James Cox.

See also

- 1920 United States presidential election
- 1920 Republican National Convention

== 1924 ==
Republican incumbent President Calvin Coolidge ran for election to a full term, and faced no major opposition in the primaries.

See also

- 1924 United States presidential election
- 1924 Republican National Convention

== 1928 ==
United States Secretary of Commerce Herbert Hoover faced no major opposition in the primaries and easily won the general election against Al Smith.

See also

- 1928 United States presidential election
- 1928 Republican National Convention

== 1932 ==
As the year 1932 began, the Republican Party believed Hoover's protectionism and aggressive fiscal policies would solve the depression. Former Senator Joseph France of Maryland was the major opponent of incumbent President Hoover and won the most states. Despite France's success in the primaries, President Herbert Hoover controlled the party and had little trouble securing a re-nomination. Soon afterwards Hoover lost the election to Democratic nominee Franklin Roosevelt.

See also

- 1932 United States presidential election
- 1932 Republican National Convention

== 1936 ==
Following the landslide defeat of incumbent president Herbert Hoover by Democrat Franklin D. Roosevelt, the Republican Party sought its first nominee to attempt to unseat the largely popular incumbent president. There were six candidates in total, but four of them were seen as "favorite son" candidates who only won their respective home states: Earl Warren of California, Frank Knox of Illinois, Stephen A. Day of Ohio, and Warren E. Green of South Dakota. Thus, the only two serious candidates were Governors William Borah of Idaho and Alfred "Alf" Landon of Kansas. Although Borah won more states' primaries, more total popular votes, and a larger percentage overall (with 5 states to Landon's 2), Landon managed to use his connections to the party machinery to secure a majority of necessary delegates at the convention, and became the nominee. Knox was chosen as Landon's running mate.

See also

- 1936 United States presidential election
- 1936 Republican National Convention

== 1940 ==
After Landon's even larger landslide loss to Roosevelt in 1936, the party sought out more moderate candidates for the nomination in 1940. There were twice as many candidates as in 1936, with 12, including former President Hoover. However, only three won any primaries: Senate Minority Leader Charles L. McNary of Oregon, Senator Robert A. Taft of Ohio, and Manhattan District Attorney Thomas Dewey of New York. Dewey won 5 states, while McNary and Taft won only one state each. However, later on in the primaries, businessman Wendell Willkie began to gain momentum due to his lack of political experience and for being a new face in the political scene. He ultimately managed to win a majority of necessary delegates at the convention, primarily when the delegates of Michigan, Pennsylvania, and New York switched their allegiances to vote for Willkie. McNary was ultimately chosen as Willkie's running mate.

See also

- 1940 United States presidential election
- 1940 Republican National Convention

== 1944 ==
Willkie had come closer to defeating Roosevelt than Hoover or Landon, but still lost substantially. At this point, a divide appeared in the Republican Party between the moderates and the conservatives, each claiming that only a candidate with their beliefs had a chance at beating Roosevelt as he ran for an unprecedented fourth term. The 1944 primaries saw 10 major candidates, which included former candidates Earl Warren and Thomas Dewey, as well as the previous nominee Wendell Willkie. One prominent candidate was General Douglas MacArthur, who was popular among conservatives and won 2 states and the most total popular votes and vote percentage, but was unable to campaign effectively or attend the convention due to still planning Allied strategies in the midst of World War II. Thus, the conservative support shifted from Robert Taft in the previous election to Governor John W. Bricker of Ohio, while the moderates supported Governor Dewey of New York, who won the most primaries with 3. Dewey ultimately secured the nomination at the convention, and selected Bricker as his running mate.

See also

- 1944 United States presidential election
- 1944 Republican National Convention

== 1948 ==
Although Dewey had also lost to Roosevelt in 1944, Roosevelt had died in office shortly thereafter, and incumbent President Harry S. Truman was widely unpopular and thus seen as easy to beat. The 1948 primaries set the record for the highest number of candidates in the history of the Republican Party, with 15 total; a record it held for nearly 70 years until 2016 surpassed it. Among them were repeat candidates Douglas MacArthur, Senator Robert Taft, Governor Earl Warren, Businessman Riley A. Bender of Illinois, and the previous nominee Thomas Dewey. Although Warren claimed the highest vote total with his sole win in California, the top two candidates were moderate Republican Dewey and former Governor Harold Stassen of Minnesota, a more liberal Republican who had previously run in 1940 and 1944. Stassen won more primaries with 4 to Dewey's 2, but after Stassen was perceived as losing the first-ever broadcast presidential debate with Dewey (on the issue of outlawing Communism in the United States), Dewey went on to easily claim the nomination for a second consecutive time (the first non-president in the Republican Party's history to do so). Warren was chosen as Dewey's running mate.

See also

- 1948 United States presidential election
- 1948 Republican National Convention

== 1952 ==
Having suffered five consecutive losses, the Republican Party sought out a candidate who could appeal to voters all across the political spectrum, possibly through name recognition. Once more, a divide emerged between the conservative wing of the party and the liberal wing. The conservatives were once again represented by Senator Robert Taft, while the liberals were represented by General Dwight D. Eisenhower. Other candidates included Governor Earl Warren of California and former Governor Harold Stassen of Minnesota. Taft narrowly won more victories than Eisenhower, with 6 primaries to Eisenhower's 5. The race was neck-and-neck by the beginning of the convention, but Eisenhower's supporters (including, most prominently, former two-time nominee Thomas Dewey and Senator Henry Cabot Lodge Jr.) accused Taft of corruption by convincing state party leaders in Texas and Georgia to give him all their delegates, rather than award them proportionately and therefore give some to Eisenhower. The delegates at the convention ultimately agreed and voted to support the "Fair Play" amendment 685–548, which convicted Taft of such and gave the delegates in question to Eisenhower by default, thus earning Eisenhower the nomination. Eisenhower then went on to win the general election in a landslide, finally putting a Republican president in the White House for the first time since 1933.

See also

- 1952 United States presidential election
- 1952 Republican National Convention

== 1956 ==
As a popular incumbent, with a strong economy and recent foreign policy victories including the Korean War, Eisenhower easily won his party's primaries in 1956 with little opposition, namely former candidate John Bricker from 1944, as well as Joe Foss of South Dakota and S.C. Arnold of Montana.

See also

- 1956 United States presidential election
- 1956 Republican National Convention

== 1960 ==
With President Eisenhower term-limited from office, the clear frontrunner for the Republican nomination was Vice President Richard Nixon, who was also very popular in his own right. He won 11 primaries, while his only two major challengers, Governor Cecil Underwood of West Virginia and State Senator James M. Lloyd of South Dakota, only won their respective home states. Thus, Nixon easily won the nomination, and selected longtime Eisenhower ally Henry Cabot Lodge Jr. as his running mate.

See also

- 1960 United States presidential election
- 1960 Republican National Convention
- Richard Nixon 1960 presidential campaign

== 1964 ==
Despite Nixon's continuing popularity, and the closeness by which he lost in 1960, he refused to seek the Republican Party's nomination in 1964, primarily due to his previous loss as well as another equally stinging loss in the 1962 California gubernatorial race. Thus, the party was left without a clear frontrunner. For the first time, the divide between conservatives and moderates allowed the conservative candidate, Senator Barry Goldwater of Arizona to win the nomination despite his unpopular, strong conservative views. His biggest challengers were Henry Cabot Lodge Jr., with 3 primary wins, and Governor Nelson Rockefeller of New York with 2; however, despite both candidates' strong alliances in the liberal wing of the party (including Lodge's continuing alliance with former President Eisenhower), both were far surpassed by Goldwater's surprising 7 victories. Other candidates included Governor James A. Rhodes of Ohio, Governor William Scranton of Pennsylvania, and Congressman John W. Byrnes of Wisconsin, who each won their own respective home states and nothing else. Also among the candidates was Senator Margaret Chase Smith of Maine, who became the first major female candidate for a major party's presidential nomination in American history.

See also

- 1964 United States presidential election
- 1964 Republican National Convention
- Barry Goldwater 1964 presidential campaign

== 1968 ==
Despite Goldwater's landslide loss to President Johnson in 1964, the struggling economy and the escalation of the unpopular Vietnam War led to Johnson's approval ratings falling dramatically, to the point where he refused to seek another term in 1968. Thus, many in the Republican Party felt that they had a strong chance of winning, and turned to former Vice President and 1960 nominee Richard Nixon to run again. Despite previously claiming he was done with politics after losing in 1960 and 1962, Nixon ultimately decided to join the race. As a moderate, Nixon faced a series of challengers from all sides of the Republican political spectrum who would rise briefly, then fall again in popularity just as another challenger arose. His first challenger was a fellow moderate, Governor George W. Romney of Michigan. Romney's record as Governor briefly elevated him with Nixon, but after a gaffe where he said he was "brainwashed" by the military into supporting the Vietnam War, he quickly lost his popularity and dropped out before the primaries even started. Nixon's next challenge was the leader of the party's liberal wing, New York Governor Nelson Rockefeller, who briefly rose in popularity with his win in Massachusetts before fading in the polls as well. By the end of the primaries, Nixon's main challenge was Governor Ronald Reagan of California, the leader of the party's conservative wing. Although Reagan's victory in his home state gave him a plurality of the popular vote, he didn't win any other primaries. Nixon won a total of 9 primaries before easily winning the nomination at the convention. Despite some supporters encouraging him to choose a former primary rival, such as Romney, as his running mate, Nixon ultimately chose Maryland Governor Spiro T. Agnew.

- 1968 United States presidential election
- 1968 Republican National Convention
- Richard Nixon 1968 presidential campaign

== 1972 ==
By 1972, Nixon was a popular incumbent president. The Vietnam War was winding down and Nixon had achieved détente with China and the Soviet Union, as well as a stable economy at home and solidified victories in the Civil Rights Movement. He had challengers, but won 1323 of the 1324 delegates on his way to the GOP convention. The sole delegate opposing his reelection was in support of Pete McCloskey, a representative from California, who ran on an anti-Vietnam War platform. The Watergate scandal began in June but interfered with neither the primaries nor the November election.

See also

- 1972 United States presidential election
- 1972 Republican National Convention
- Richard Nixon 1972 presidential campaign

== 1976 ==
Gerald Ford had become Vice President after the resignation of Vice President Spiro Agnew. Upon the resignation of President Richard Nixon following the Watergate Scandal, Ford became the first President never elected president or vice president. This status, plus the fall of Vietnam, a struggling economy, and Ford's pardon of Nixon, caused politicians in both major parties to view Ford as vulnerable. Ronald Reagan led the conservative wing of the party in condemning Ford's foreign policy in Vietnam, Eastern Europe and Panama. Ford held a lead from the beginning until the North Carolina primary, where he was upset by Reagan. Reagan then put together a string of victories throughout the South that put him back in the race. Ford bounced back in his native Michigan. From there, a close battle in the remaining states led to a convention in which Ford held the lead, but not the necessary majority. Reagan gambled by announcing he would choose moderate Pennsylvania Senator Richard Schweiker as his running mate - the move ultimately backfired by alienating conservatives. Ford narrowly won on the first ballot, and avoided the same mistake as Reagan by choosing conservative Kansas Senator Bob Dole as his running mate.

See also

- 1976 United States presidential election
- 1976 Republican National Convention
- Gerald Ford 1976 presidential campaign

== 1980 ==
Ronald Reagan entered the season as the overwhelming favorite to win the nomination. He lost his lead with a strategy of forums, polls and other events. George H. W. Bush used the McGovern/Carter strategy and began to come in first at these events. Bush beat Reagan in the Iowa straw poll in January. Reagan responded by sweeping the South. Although he lost a few more primaries and even came in third in one state, he had the contest won early, and went into the convention with almost all the delegates. Although Reagan was initially prepared to choose former President Gerald Ford as his running mate, he found that too many of Ford's conditions were asking for so much power that Ford would be more a "co-president" than a vice president. Thus, just hours before Reagan had to make his decision, Reagan chose Bush as his running mate.

See also

- 1980 United States presidential election
- 1980 Republican National Convention
- Ronald Reagan 1980 presidential campaign

== 1984 ==
The incumbent President Ronald Reagan won all but two of the delegates, who abstained from voting.

See also

- 1984 United States presidential election
- 1984 Republican National Convention
- Ronald Reagan 1984 presidential campaign

== 1988 ==
Vice President George H. W. Bush entered the contest with the support of President Ronald Reagan. Bush had trouble at first but by the time Super Tuesday was over his campaign's organization and fundraising ability had overwhelmed his opponents. He received all the votes at the convention.

See also

- 1988 United States presidential election
- 1988 Republican National Convention
- George H. W. Bush 1988 presidential campaign

== 1992 ==
Pat Buchanan mounted a challenge that was too weak to seriously stop President George H. W. Bush's nomination for a second term. However, it was strong enough to alter the party platform and push it to the right, and to award Buchanan the keynote speech at the convention.

See also

- 1992 United States presidential election
- 1992 Republican National Convention
- George H. W. Bush 1992 presidential campaign

== 1996 ==
Bob Dole, the Kansas Senator and Senate Majority Leader, who was also the vice presidential nominee 20 years earlier in 1976, was widely viewed as the most prominent Republican in the race. As he had been widely expected to compete for the 1996 presidential nomination ever since the 1992 campaign, he was the early favorite to win. However, his campaign stumbled in the first few contests as it fell behind conservative insurgent Pat Buchanan in New Hampshire and publishing magnate Steve Forbes in Delaware and Arizona. Dole rebounded with easy victories in the Dakotas and South Carolina, eventually winning every single state thereafter, save a narrow Buchanan win in Missouri.

See also

- 1996 United States presidential election
- 1996 Republican National Convention
- Bob Dole 1996 presidential campaign

== 2000 ==
Texas Governor George W. Bush entered the race as the favorite, being the son of a former president. He faced early opposition from the well-organized campaign of wealthy businessman Steve Forbes, who quickly fizzled. Bush easily won in Iowa but suffered a severe blow when Arizona Senator John McCain emerged as an insurgent candidate and defeated him in New Hampshire by 18 points. Bush struck back with a win in South Carolina after a bruising primary fight there. McCain rebounded with wins in Michigan and his home state of Arizona, but lacked the money and organization to keep up with Bush in the Super Tuesday contests, where Bush won all but a few New England states. McCain suspended his campaign the next day.

See also

- 2000 United States presidential election
- 2000 Republican National Convention
- George W. Bush 2000 presidential campaign

== 2004 ==
As a popular wartime President, George W. Bush was unopposed for the nomination and clinched it easily.

See also

- 2004 United States presidential election
- 2004 Republican National Convention
- George W. Bush 2004 presidential campaign

== 2008 ==
President George W. Bush, was ineligible to run for a third term due to the Twenty-second Amendment, and Vice President Dick Cheney did not seek the nomination, so the field was wide open. Former New York City Mayor Rudy Giuliani was the frontrunner in the polls for most of 2007, but made a critical mistake by skipping the early primaries and staking his fortune on a win in Florida the week before Super Tuesday. This backfired badly as John McCain, the runner-up of the 2000 primaries, whose campaign had been written off long before as a lost cause, surged suddenly in New Hampshire and rode a wave of momentum through South Carolina to defeat all other contenders in Florida. Giuliani quickly dropped out and endorsed McCain, but former Massachusetts Governor Mitt Romney, a well-organized candidate who up to that point had won only his native Michigan and a couple minor caucus states, fought on. McCain easily beat him on Super Tuesday, with assistance from former Arkansas Governor Mike Huckabee, a conservative contender who stole a few crucial Southern primaries, thus shutting Romney out. Romney suspended his campaign during the CPAC convention that week, leaving only Huckabee, who said he would stay in until the nomination fight was over. He dropped out in early March after McCain won Texas and Ohio, thus clinching the nomination. Texas Representative Ron Paul, who had generated a lot of Internet buzz, but did not win a single contest, stayed in the race until the last primary votes were cast in June.

See also

- 2008 United States presidential election
- 2008 Republican National Convention
- John McCain 2008 presidential campaign
- Mitt, a Netflix documentary which chronicles Romney's bid for the '08 nomination

== 2012 ==
For the first time in modern Republican primary history, three different candidates won the three key early contests: Former Pennsylvania Senator Rick Santorum in the Iowa caucuses (though Romney was originally believed to have won before a recount), Mitt Romney in the New Hampshire primary, and former Speaker of the House Newt Gingrich in the South Carolina primary. However, only Romney and Santorum seemed to project national strength, as Gingrich's only win after South Carolina would be his home state of Georgia. Ron Paul, who had been expected to perform much better than he did in 2008, only scored second-place finishes in contests such as New Hampshire and Virginia (where only he and Romney were on the ballot), and a narrow win in the popular vote in the U.S. Virgin Islands. However, he did have the most second-place wins overall. Romney maintained the upper hand throughout the primaries, winning most of the Super Tuesday contests and holding onto a wide lead in delegates. Santorum's final efforts included a surprise victory in the Colorado caucuses, which Romney was expected to win, and narrow second-place performances in Michigan and Ohio. Santorum dropped out of the presidential race on April 10, leaving Romney undisputed in his drive for the party's nomination.

See also

- 2012 United States presidential election
- 2012 Republican National Convention
- Mitt Romney 2012 presidential campaign

== 2016 ==
The 2016 GOP primaries featured what was at the time the largest field in the history of both major parties, with 17 major contenders eventually announcing bids. Businessman Donald Trump announced he was running for president in the summer of 2015 and dominated most Republican polling from that point on. He suffered an early upset in the Iowa caucuses, which were won by Texas Senator Ted Cruz, with Florida Senator Marco Rubio finishing an unexpectedly strong third, essentially narrowing the contest to a three-way race. Trump rebounded and carried the remainder of the early contests, and came out on top in the Super Tuesday contests. Cruz, however, won his home state of Texas, giving him a strong boost going forward. Rubio managed only wins in Minnesota, Puerto Rico and the District of Columbia before losing his home state of Florida to Trump and being forced to drop out. Governor John Kasich of Ohio, who had placed second in New Hampshire, won his home state, but nowhere else. It was heavily speculated that Trump would not win the required number of delegates to clinch the nomination, resulting in a contested convention in Cleveland. However, those fears were laid to rest after Trump swept six Northeastern states (including his home state of New York), and decisively won Indiana, a state that Cruz needed in order to continue his campaign. Both Cruz and Kasich suspended their campaigns afterward, leaving Trump as the only candidate left and the presumptive nominee.

Cruz chose former Hewlett-Packard CEO Carly Fiorina (who had dropped out of the race after New Hampshire) as his vice presidential running mate, in a highly unusual move, six days before he dropped out. Cruz's action, was similar to Reagan's choice of Schweiker as running mate, before the 1976 Republican National Convention.

See also

- 2016 United States presidential election
- 2016 Republican National Convention
- Donald Trump 2016 presidential campaign

== 2020 ==
President Donald Trump easily defeated minor candidates such as Bill Weld in order to be nominated for a second term. The COVID-19 pandemic caused many primaries to be moved to later in the year, and the Republican National Convention was moved from North Carolina as a result.

See also

- 2020 United States presidential election
- 2020 Republican National Convention
- Donald Trump 2020 presidential campaign

== 2024 ==
Former President Donald Trump easily defeated major candidates such as Nikki Haley and Ron DeSantis in order to be nominated for a nonconsecutive second term.

See also

- 2024 United States presidential election
- 2024 Republican National Convention
- Donald Trump 2024 presidential campaign

== See also ==
- List of Democratic Party presidential primaries
