= Jack Casey =

American Democratic Party politician (1935–2019)

John "Jack" Casey
- Born: June 1, 1935
- Died: February 24, 2019 (aged 83); Fort Myers, Florida, U.S.
- Education: Rider College
- Political party: Democratic Party

John "Jack" Casey (June 1, 1935 – February 24, 2019) was an American Democratic Party politician who served one four-year term in the New Jersey Senate, where he represented the 7th Legislative District from 1994 to 1998. Casey also served in the New Jersey General Assembly in 1991.

Casey earned an associate degree from Rider College with a major in business. He was employed as an audit manager for Philadelphia Financial Corporation. He served as Treasurer of Burlington County, New Jersey from 1975 to 1978 and was mayor of Palmyra from 1984 to 1987.

In a party convention in January 1991, Casey was chosen to fill the remaining portion of the term remaining in the General Assembly seat that had been vacated by Thomas P. Foy the previous month. As part of what the Philadelphia Inquirer described as an "anti-tax tidal wave [that] swept seven South Jersey Democrats from their legislative seats", Foy was defeated in the Senate race in the 7th District, while Casey and fellow incumbent Barbara Kalik lost to Republicans Priscilla B. Anderson and Jose Sosa.

Casey was elected to the Senate in 1993, defeating Republican incumbent Bradford S. Smith. Casey had been a last-minute choice to fill an opening on the Democratic ballot and his win accounted for one of the three seats picked up by the Democrats in the 1993 elections. In the Senate, Casey served on the Community Affairs Committee, the Economic Growth, Agriculture and Tourism Committee and the State Management, Investments and Financial Institutions Committee.

Casey did not run for re-election in 1997, and in the Senate race that year Republican Diane Allen defeated the Democratic nominee Robert P. Broderick.

Casey died on February 24, 2019, at the age of 83.
