= José F. Sosa =

American politician

Member of the New Jersey General Assembly from the 7th district
- In office January 14, 1992 – January 11, 1994
- Preceded by: Jack Casey; Barbara Kalik
- Succeeded by: Steven M. Petrillo; George E. Williams

Personal details
- Born: December 25, 1950 (age 75) San Juan, Puerto Rico
- Party: Republican

José F. Sosa (born December 25, 1950) is an American Republican Party politician who served in the New Jersey General Assembly from the 7th Legislative District from 1992 to 1994. Sosa was the state's second Hispanic legislator, after Bob Menendez.

Sosa had served on the Mount Holly Township Council and as the township's mayor.

Together with Frank Catania, Sosa was one of the major sponsors of a measure that reduced the state sales tax from 7% to 6%, a measure that reduced taxation on residents by $600 million, as part of the Republican effort to roll back the $2.8 billion in tax increases that had been made by the Democratic-controlled legislature under Governor James Florio.

He has been a resident of Westampton, New Jersey.
