= 2000 Republican National Convention =

U.S. political event held in Philadelphia, Pennsylvania

- 2000 presidential election

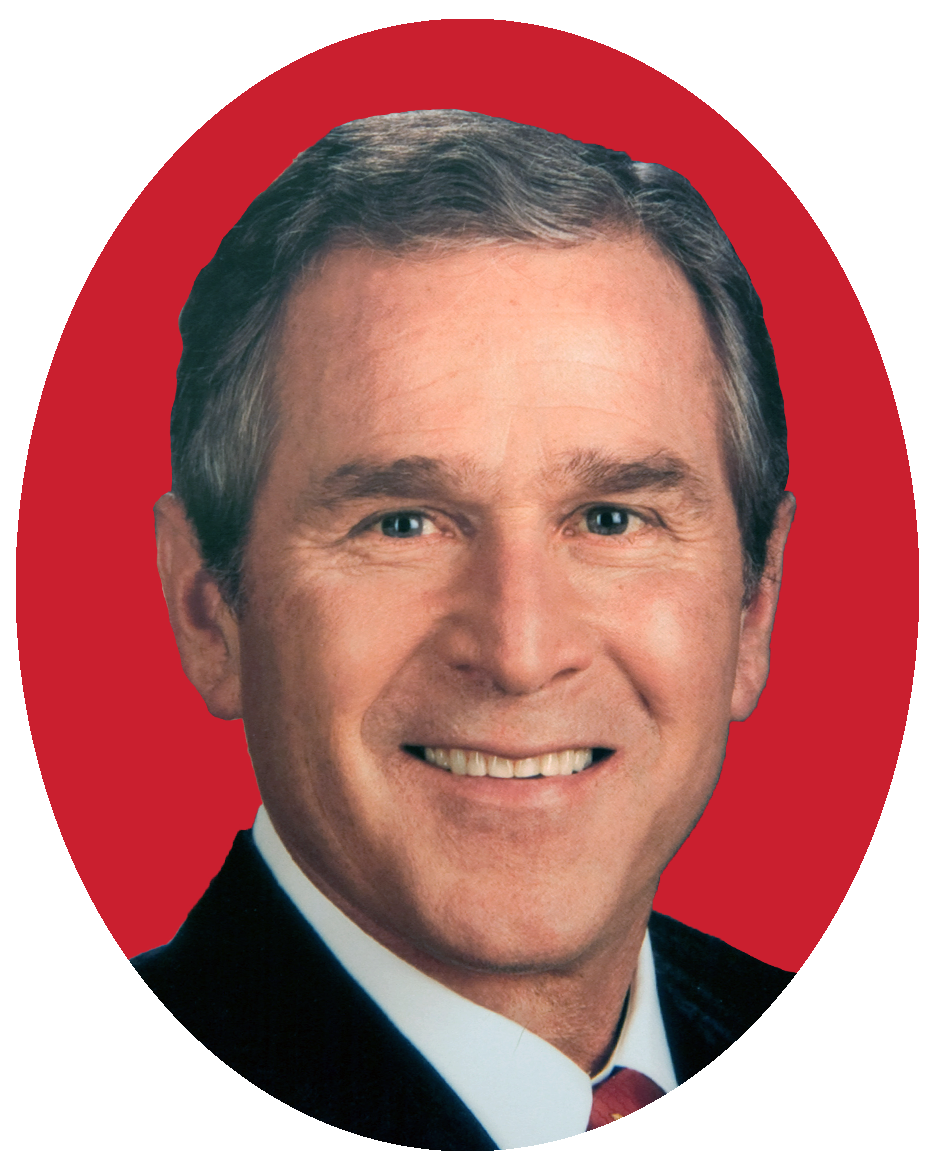
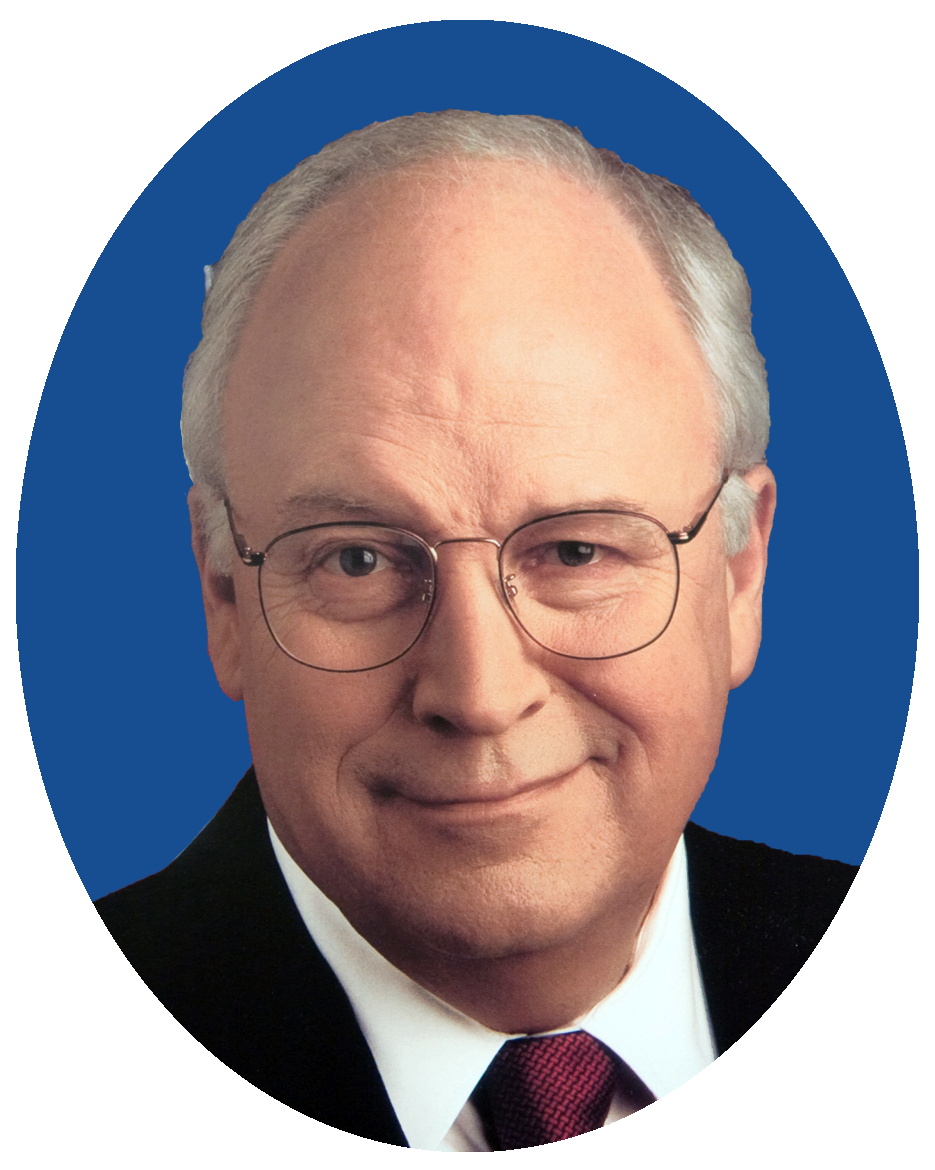
- Nominees; Bush and Cheney

Convention
- Dates: July 31 – August 3, 2000
- City: Philadelphia, Pennsylvania
- Venue: First Union Center
- Keynote speaker: John McCain & Colin Powell

Candidates
- Presidential nominee: George W. Bush of Texas
- Vice-presidential nominee: Dick Cheney of Wyoming

Voting
- Total delegates: 2,066
- Votes needed for nomination: 1,034
- Results (president): Bush (TX): 2,058 (99.61%); Keyes (MD): 6 (0.29%); McCain (AZ): 1 (0.05%); Abstention: 1 (0.05%)
- Results (vice president): Cheney (WY): 100% (Acclamation)
- Ballots: 1

The 2000 Republican National Convention convened at the First Union Center (now the Xfinity Mobile Arena) in Philadelphia, Pennsylvania, from July 31 to August 3, 2000. The 2,066 delegates assembled at the convention nominated Texas Governor George W. Bush for president and former U.S. Secretary of Defense Richard B. "Dick" Cheney for vice president.

== Background ==
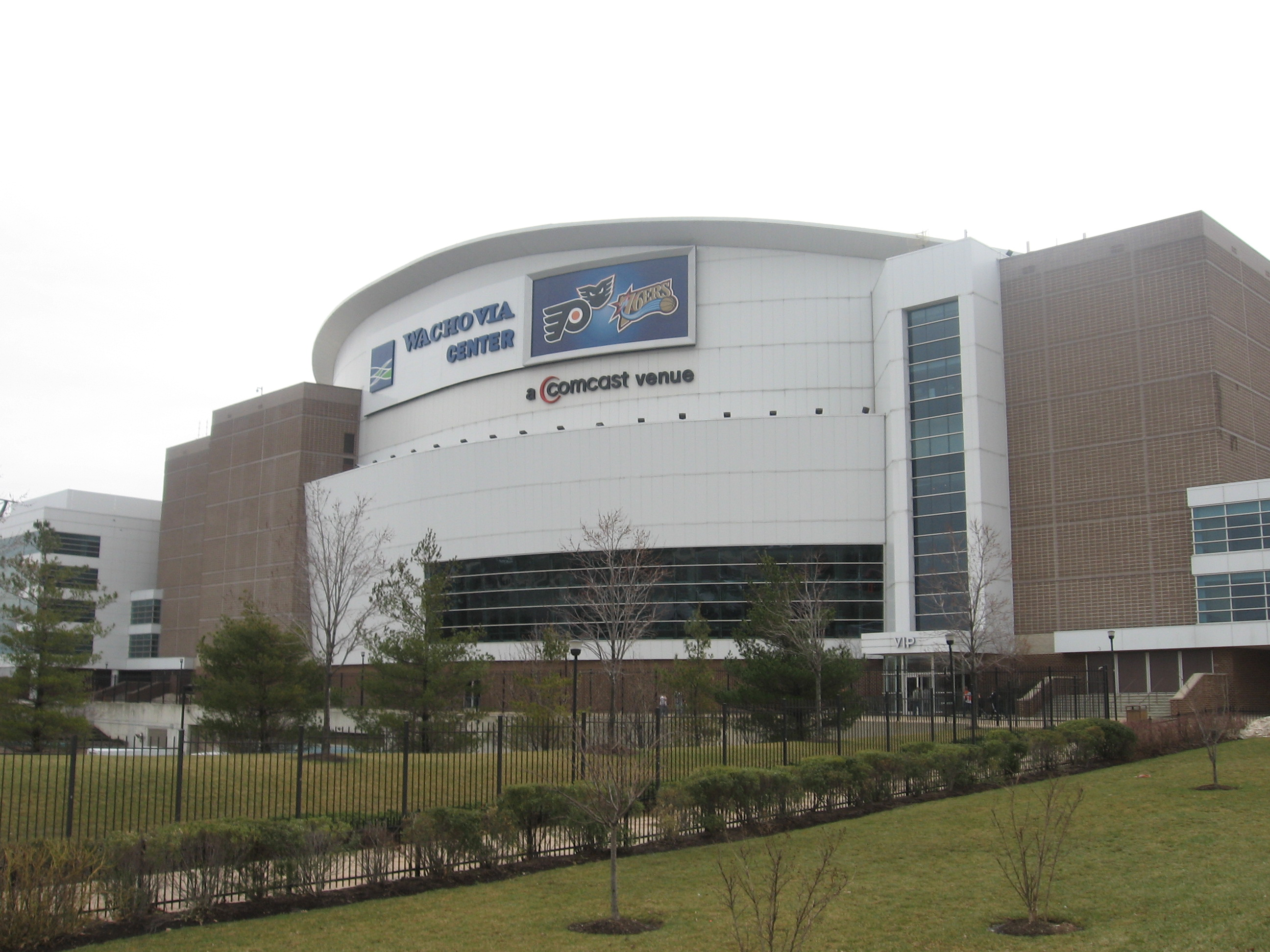
The First Union Center, now known as the Xfinity Mobile Arena, was the site of the 2000 Republican National Convention

Bush, eldest son of the 41st president, was identified early as the party establishment's frontrunner and turned back a strong primary challenge from John McCain, a Vietnam War veteran and U.S. Senator from Arizona. At the convention, the party and campaign sought to showcase Bush's slogan of compassionate conservatism to persuade undecided voters.

== Roll call vote ==
Instead of holding the roll call of states on one night, the Bush campaign arranged for the voting to take place over four nights, so that Bush would eventually build up support throughout the week, culminating with Cheney's home state of Wyoming finally putting him over the top on the final night. There were few defections, despite a large contingent of delegates having been elected to support McCain, who formally released them to Bush.

Republican National Convention presidential vote, 2000
Candidate	Votes	Percentage
George W. Bush	2,058	99.61%
Alan Keyes	6	0.29%
John McCain	1	0.05%
Abstentions	1	0.05%
Totals	2,066	100.00%

The convention then voted by acclamation to make the convention nomination unanimous. Cheney's nomination as vice president had also been approved by acclamation on Wednesday night, so Cheney could address the convention later that night as the official nominee.

== Cheney's acceptance speech ==
Cheney's convention address was the first to include sustained attacks on Vice President Al Gore, the presumptive Democratic nominee—whereas most of the speakers who came before him criticized the vice president only briefly, or without mentioning his name. (This was part of the Bush campaign's strategy to "change the tone" in national politics by moving beyond the division and bitterness of recent partisan discourse.) Cheney, however, was given latitude to lob various direct attacks on Clinton and Gore, and even reprised a line that Gore had used in his 1992 convention address attacking the first President Bush: "It is time for them to go."

This was the first vice-presidential acceptance speech in recent memory to be held the night before the presidential nominee's address. The standard practice at the time was for both nominees to give their speeches the same night. Cheney's speech began a tradition of vice-presidential nominees headlining their own night at the convention; two weeks later, at the Democratic convention, that party's vice-presidential nominee, Joe Lieberman, also spoke on the third night as opposed to the final night.

== Bush's acceptance speech ==
In his speech, Bush attacked the Clinton administration on defense and military topics, high taxes, underfunded schools, high pollution, and a lack of dignity and respect for the presidency. He attacked Clinton's military policies, claiming that American troops were "not ready for duty, sir." He also claimed the Clinton administration had failed to provide leadership, saying, "They've had their chance. They have not led. We will."

== Speakers ==
Major speakers included nominees Bush and Cheney; their wives Laura Bush and Lynn Cheney (who continued the then-recently-established tradition of convention speeches by spouses of nominees); Colin Powell and John McCain (who each delivered keynote speeches).

== Public reception ==
In July 1999, the LGBT+ community of Philadelphia held two protests on July 29 and 30. They did this in objection to Philadelphia hosting the Republican National Convention. The protests resulted in the arrest of over 300 people.

The initial protest was not target to the Republican Party specifically, rather, it was a call to change from both Republican and Democratic parties. The protesters felt that both political parties for the most part, ignored the needs and issues surrounding the LGBT community.

== See also ==
- 2000 Republican Party presidential primaries
- History of the Republican Party (United States)
- List of Republican National Conventions
- United States presidential nominating convention
- 2000 Democratic National Convention
- 2000 United States presidential election
- George W. Bush 2000 presidential campaign

Preceded by 1996; San Diego, California	Republican National Conventions	Succeeded by 2004; New York, New York
