= Burlington County Scholastic League =

The Burlington County Scholastic League (BCSL) is a New Jersey high school sports conference under the jurisdiction of the New Jersey State Interscholastic Athletic Association (NJSIAA). The league consists of nineteen public and parochial high schools covering Burlington County (Doane Academy), Mercer County (Thrive Charter School, and STEMCivics Purplefect Palace High School), Ocean County (New Egypt High School) in central New Jersey and Camden County (Pennsauken High School). All schools that sponsor a football program are members of the West Jersey Football League.

== Member schools ==
School	Location	School District	Team Name
Bordentown Regional High School	Bordentown	Bordentown Regional School District	Scotties
Burlington City High School	Burlington	City of Burlington Public School District	Blue Devils
Burlington County Institute of Technology Medford Campus	Medford Township	Burlington County Institute of Technology	Jaguars
Burlington County Institute of Technology Westampton Campus	Westampton Township	Burlington County Institute of Technology	Panthers
Burlington Township High School	Burlington Township	Burlington Township School District	Falcons
Cinnaminson High School	Cinnaminson Township	Cinnaminson Township Public Schools	Pirates
Delran High School	Delran Township	Delran Township School District	Bears
Doane Academy	Burlington		Spartans
Florence Township Memorial High School	Florence Township	Florence Township School District	Flashes
Holy Cross Academy	Delran Township		Lancers
Maple Shade High School	Maple Shade Township	Maple Shade School District	Wildcats
Moorestown High School	Moorestown Township	Moorestown Township Public Schools	Quakers
Northern Burlington County Regional High School	Columbus	Northern Burlington County Regional School District	Greyhounds
New Egypt High School	Plumsted Township	Plumsted Township School District	Warriors
Palmyra High School	Palmyra	Palmyra Public Schools	Panthers
Pemberton Township High School	Pemberton Township	Pemberton Township School District	Hornets
Pennsauken High School	Pennsauken Township	Pennsauken Public Schools	Indians
Rancocas Valley Regional High School	Mount Holly Township	Rancocas Valley Regional High School District	Red Devils
Riverside High School	Riverside Township	Riverside School District	Rams
STEMCivics Purplefect Palace High School	Ewing (unincorporated community), New Jersey	N/A	N/A
Thrive Charter School	Hamilton Township		Titans
Willingboro High School	Willingboro Township	Willingboro Township Public Schools	Chimeras
