= Mary's Cafe sit-in =

First known protest by Dr. Martin Luther King Jr.

Mary's Cafe Sit-In
- Part of the Civil Rights Movement
- Date: June 11–12, 1950
- Location: Maple Shade, New Jersey, U.S.
- Caused by: Racial segregation of Public accommodations in the United States; Mary's Cafe reputation for unwelcoming attitude
- Result: State of New Jersey v. Nichols; Martin Luther King Jr. interest in protest

Parties
| Martin Luther King Jr.; Walter McCall; Doris Wilson; Pearl Smith; Ulysses Simpson Wiggins; NAACP | Ernest Nichols; Mary's Cafe; Maple Shade Township Police Department |

The Mary's Cafe Sit-In was an informal sit-in style protest which occurred on the evening of June 11, 1950, at Mary's Cafe, a tavern in Maple Shade Township, New Jersey, that had a reputation of being unwelcoming of Black patrons. After being refused service, Martin Luther King Jr. and three friends staged a sit-in that is believed to be the first use of the non-violence and civil disobedience tactics which would distinguish Dr. King's civil-rights activism and legacy. King would later cite this incident saying it was "a formative step" in his "commitment to a more just society."

== Background ==
Dr. Martin Luther King Jr. attended Crozer Theological Seminary in Upland, Pennsylvania, from 1948 to 1951. During this time, he and fellow seminarian Walter McCall rented an apartment at 753 Walnut Street in Camden, New Jersey.

Hunt, King and McCall's landlord, had warned the pair of seminarians that Black people were not welcome at Mary's Cafe. King replied to the effect of maybe they needed to go, so they could start to go anywhere they wanted. The young seminarians had opted for Mary's Cafe with full knowledge of its reputation.

== Events ==
On Sunday, June 11, 1950, King, Walter McCall, and their dates Doris Wilson and Pearl Smith attended church services in Merchantville, New Jersey. Afterwards they decided to stop at Mary's Cafe in Maple Shade for beers. The foursome were left waiting without anyone approaching them for service, not unexpectedly. After waiting without service, McCall approached the bar.

McCall asked bartender and Mary's Cafe owner Ernest Nichols for packaged goods (beer for takeaway). Nichols refused the request and cited it being Sunday explaining he couldn't sell packaged goods on Sundays or any day after 10:00 pm by law. McCall then requested four glasses of beer to which Nichols answered "no beer, Mr! Today is Sunday". Nichols would later claim they sought to have him violate New Jersey's blue law (a legal restriction which is common in South Jersey and Pennsylvania as a remnant of the heavy influence of their Quakers roots). Finally, McCall requested ginger ales as non-alcoholic beverages would not be subject to the blue law. Nichols refused the group even ginger ales and reportedly stated "the best thing would be for you to leave".

King and company met refusal with refusal and remained in their seats as was their right per New Jersey's 1945 anti-discrimination law which guaranteed non-discrimination by race in public accommodations. Nichols then stomped out of the tavern and returned with a gun standing outside the bar firing into the air reportedly shouting "I'd kill for less". Fearing for their lives, the four activists ran from the tavern as Nichols continue to wave the gun skyward.

Following the incident, the group went to the Maple Shade Police Department where officers refused to file their complaint about the confrontation and threats. King and McCall contacted Ulysses Simpson Wiggins then President of the Camden County Branch NAACP, who helped them successfully file a police report. The New York Times states that "the complaint was against Ernest Nichols, a white tavern owner in Maple Shade, N.J., and said that he had refused to serve the black students and their dates in June 1950, and had threatened them by firing a gun in the air. The complaint was signed by the two students. One of the signatures, in a loopy, slanted cursive, reads 'M. L. King Jr.'"

Nichols was charged with disorderly conduct and violation of the anti-discrimination law. He was found guilty and fined $50 for his actions, however the racial discrimination count was dismissed. In a statement submitted "in the spirit of assisting the Prosecutor" Nichol's attorney claimed that:

Mr. Nichols claims that this act was not intended as a threat to his colored patrons. The colored patrons, on the other hand, while they admit that the gun was not pointed at them or any of them, seemed to think that it was a threat. Mr. Nichols on the other hand states that he has been held up before and he wanted to alert his watchdog who was somewhere outside on the tavern grounds.

— Statement on Behalf of Ernest Nichols, State of New Jersey vs. Ernest Nichols, by W. Thomas McGann

== Legacy ==
Albeit a small act of protest and activism against racial injustice the Mary's Cafe sit-in demonstrated the power of non-violent civil disobedience. Nichols's reaction in retrieving a weapon and discharging it in the air whether to scare the group or merely to summon his guard dog to young people's refusal to leave unserved likely showed King the potency of such tactics. The Mary's Cafe sit-in is believed to be the first deployment of the non-violence and civil disobedience tactics which would distinguish Dr. King's activism and legacy.

The Mary's Cafe sit-in occurred six months prior to Dr. Mordecai Johnson's 1950 Lecture on Mahatma Gandi at the First Unitarian Church of Philadelphia on November 19, 1950 where King would be formally exposed to these tactics. At that lecture and in discussions with Dr. Johnson lasting late into the night at the Fellowship House (who sponsored the lecture), Dr. King would be inspired and galvanized by of how Mahatma Gandhi integrated Henry David Thoreau's theory of Nonviolent resistance and civil disobedience tactics.

== Historical recognition ==
Patrick Duff, a South Jersey resident and amateur historian, discovered the police report detailing the events at Mary's Cafe and clarifying time and location details around Dr. Mordecai Johnson's 1950 Lecture on Mahatma Gandi. Duff became interested in King's South Jersey civil rights legacy after learning King and McCall resided at 753 Walnut Street while attending Crozer Seminary. Seeking to recognition of the property as a Camden connection to Dr. King, Duff had been searching the archive held by The Martin Luther King, Jr. Research and Education Institute in 2015 leading to these discoveries.
