= BCSL =

BCSL may refer to:

- Bergen County Scholastic League, a New Jersey high school athletic league
- Burlington County Scholastic League, a New Jersey high school athletic league
- Black Clouds & Silver Linings, Dream Theater's 10th studio album released on June 23, 2009
