= Merchantville School District =

School district in Camden County, New Jersey, US

Address
- 130 South Centre Street Merchantville, Camden County, New Jersey, 08109; United States
- Coordinates: 39.949339°N 75.048688°W

District information
- Grades: Pre-K to 8
- Superintendent: Vincent Palmieri
- Business administrator: Greg Gontowski
- Schools: 1

Students and staff
- Enrollment: 400 (as of 2023–24)
- Faculty: 35.5 FTEs
- Student–teacher ratio: 11.3:1

Other information
- District Factor Group: DE
- Website: www.merchantvilleschool.org
Ind.	Per pupil	District spending	Rank (*)	K-8 average	%± vs. average
1A	Total Spending	$17,705	27	$18,891	−6.3%
1	Budgetary Cost	13,854	20	14,159	−2.2%
2	Classroom Instruction	8,669	26	8,659	0.1%
6	Support Services	1,731	15	2,167	−20.1%
8	Administrative Cost	1,794	49	1,547	16.0%
10	Operations & Maintenance	1,502	21	1,612	−6.8%
13	Extracurricular Activities	158	37	104	51.9%
16	Median Teacher Salary	71,151	68	61,136
Data from NJDoE 2014 Taxpayers' Guide to Education Spending. *Of K-8 districts with up to 400 students. Lowest spending=1; Highest=71

The Merchantville School District is a community public school district that serves students in pre-kindergarten through eighth grade from Merchantville, in Camden County, in the U.S. state of New Jersey.

As of the 2023–24 school year, the district, comprised of one school, had an enrollment of 400 students and 35.5 classroom teachers (on an FTE basis), for a student–teacher ratio of 11.3:1.

Starting in September 2015, for ninth through twelfth grades, students from Merchantville attend Haddon Heights High School as part of a new sending/receiving relationship with the Haddon Heights School District that was approved by the commissioner of the New Jersey Department of Education, joining students from Barrington and Lawnside, who already attend the Haddon Heights school. As of the 2023–24 school year, the high school had an enrollment of 942 students and 80.0 classroom teachers (on an FTE basis), for a student–teacher ratio of 11.8:1.

== History ==
Starting in 1929, the district had its own high school, Merchantville High School, for students of both the borough and the neighboring communities of Cherry Hill and Pennsauken Township, as well as Maple Shade Township in Burlington County. But with the loss of Maple Shade students to the new Maple Shade High School in 1972, Merchantville closed its high school after the end of the 1971-72 school year and started sending its students to Pennsauken High School for grades nine through twelve.

After Merchantville High School shut down, Merchantville students attended Pennsauken High School starting in the 1972 school year, as part of a longstanding sending/receiving relationship with the Pennsauken Public Schools in Pennsauken Township. In 1992 Merchantville considered severing its send-receive relationship with Pennsauken School District so Merchantville could send them to Haddonfield Memorial High School instead, on the grounds that Merchantville saw Pennsauken High as outdated and Haddonfield Memorial as having superior facilities. Merchantville officials publicly stated in the 1980s and 1990s that they felt Pennsauken High had too many students and was too large. John Ellis, the New Jersey State Commissioner of Education, blocked Merchantville leaving the partnership on the grounds that it would cause more white students to leave Pennsauken High and turn Pennsauken High into a majority minority school. The Pennsauken District sought to recommit to ties with Merchantville.

Starting in September 2015, students from Merchantville began to attend Haddon Heights Junior/Senior High School (for the high school level only); students already in high school before 2015 continued to attend Pennsauken High until their graduation.

The district had been classified by the New Jersey Department of Education as being in District Factor Group "DE", the fifth-highest of eight groupings. District Factor Groups organize districts statewide to allow comparison by common socioeconomic characteristics of the local districts. From lowest socioeconomic status to highest, the categories are A, B, CD, DE, FG, GH, I and J.

== Schools ==
Merchantville Elementary School served 396 students as of the 2023–24 school year, per the National Center for Education Statistics.

== Administration ==
Core members of the district's administration are:

- Vincent Palmieri, chief school administrator
- Greg Gontowski, business administrator and board secretary

== Board of education ==
The district's board of education, comprised of nine members, sets policy and oversees the fiscal and educational operation of the district through its administration. As a Type II school district, the board's trustees are elected directly by voters to serve three-year terms of office on a staggered basis, with three seats up for election each year held (since 2012) as part of the November general election. The board appoints a superintendent to oversee the district's day-to-day operations and a business administrator to supervise the business functions of the district.
