= Burlington County Institute of Technology Westampton Campus =

High school in Burlington County, New Jersey, US

Location
- 695 Woodlane Road; Westampton, Burlington County, New Jersey 08060; United States
- Coordinates: 40.014657°N 74.823336°W

Information
- Other names: BCIT Westampton, Westampton Tech, WesTech
- Type: Vo-tech public high school
- School district: Burlington County Institute of Technology
- NCES School ID: 340249000996
- Principal: Joseph Venuto
- Faculty: 84.8 FTEs
- Grades: 9-12
- Enrollment: 1,300 (as of 2024–25)
- Student to teacher ratio: 15.3:1
- Colors: Blue; White and Grey
- Athletics conference: Burlington County Scholastic League
- Team name: Panthers
- Website: www.bcit.cc/o/bcitwc

The Burlington County Institute of Technology Westampton Campus (more commonly known as Westampton Tech) is a four-year countywide vocational-technical public high school serving students in ninth through twelfth grades from Burlington County, in the U.S. state of New Jersey, as part of the Burlington County Institute of Technology. Located in Westampton, the campus is one of two high schools in the district, along with the Medford campus.

As of the 2024–25 school year, the school had an enrollment of 1,300 students and 84.8 classroom teachers (on an FTE basis), for a student–teacher ratio of 15.3:1. There were 554 students (42.6% of enrollment) eligible for free lunch and 128 (9.8% of students) eligible for reduced-cost lunch.

== Athletics ==
The BCIT Westampton Panthers compete in the Burlington County Scholastic League, an athletic conference comprised of public and public high schools located in Burlington County and the surrounding counties that operates under the aegis of the New Jersey State Interscholastic Athletic Association (NJSIAA). With 938 students in grades 10-12, the school was classified by the NJSIAA for the 2019–20 school year as Group III for most athletic competition purposes, which included schools with an enrollment of 761 to 1,058 students in that grade range.

== Administration ==
The school's principal is Joseph Venuto. His administration team includes three assistant principals.

== Notable alumni ==
- Ant Clemons, singer-songwriter, who released his debut album Happy 2 Be Here in March 2020.
