= Burrell Ives Humphreys =

American judge (1927–2024)

- Born: May 18, 1927; Camden, New Jersey, U.S.
- Died: September 19, 2024 (aged 97)
- Education: Dickinson College, Temple Law School
- Occupations: Prosecutor, judge
- Political party: Democratic
- Spouse: Joy Strong (m. 1950)
- Children: 3

Burrell Ives Humphreys (May 18, 1927 – September 19, 2024) was an American judge on the New Jersey Superior Court and county prosecutor. He was the lead prosecutor in the second murder trial of Rubin Carter, which resulted in Carter's conviction in December 1976.

== Early career ==
Humphreys was born in Camden, New Jersey, and raised in Merchantville, New Jersey, where he graduated from Merchantville High School. He attended Dickinson College, graduating in 1950, Temple Law School, graduating in 1953, and was admitted to the bar in 1954. He clerked for Richard Hartshorne of the United States District Court for the District of New Jersey. In private practice he was an associate at a firm in Newark and then a partner at Hoffman & Humphreys in Wayne. In the 1960s he worked as hearing examiner for civil rights in the state Attorney General's office. He opposed the Vietnam War and became a member of the NAACP.

== Prosecutor ==
A Democrat, Humphreys became the Passaic County Prosecutor in June 1975, appointed by New Jersey Governor Brendan Byrne. In March 1976 the New Jersey Supreme Court overturned the 1967 conviction of two black men, Rubin "Hurricane" Carter and John Artis, for a triple murder of three white victims in a bar in Paterson. The court ruled that the Passaic County Prosecutor's Office had withheld key details from the defense. Humphreys announced immediately that he would retry the case.

Before the retrial started Humphreys offered to dismiss the charge against Carter if he took a new polygraph test conducted by an independent administrator, but Carter declined. Humphreys personally prosecuted the case, and ensured that unlike the all-white jury in the first trial, the second jury had two black jurors. Humphreys focused on the "racial revenge theory" surrounding suspect Eddie Rawls, a black man whose stepfather had been murdered at a different bar earlier the same night. At the trial Humphreys said Rawls was "all over this case" and obtained a court order to see if Rawls had hidden the murder weapons in his stepfather's coffin. Humphreys obtained a polygraph for key witness Arthur Bello, who had recanted his testimony in 1974, but who Humphreys still wanted to use as a witness. To the surprise of the defense, Bello took the stand and recanted his recantation, identifying Carter and Artis once again.

Carter and Artis were convicted again of three counts of first degree murder in December 1976. Carter and Artis's lawyers filed an appeal motion in 1978, saying they had been misled by the prosecution over Bello's polygraph test. Humphreys responded by saying Carter and Artis had received "an eminently fair trial". The verdict was upheld by the New Jersey Supreme Court in 1982 but was set aside by federal judge H. Lee Sarokin of the United States District Court for the District of New Jersey in 1985. Sarokin criticized the racial revenge theory, writing that "the jury was permitted to draw inferences of guilt based solely upon the race of (the defendants)."

As a prosecutor Humphreys was philosophically opposed to the death penalty, although he said he could be in favor if it was proved to have a significant reduction in the crime rate.

== Superior Court judge ==
In 1980 Humphreys became an Appellate Court judge. In 1982 he ruled that the Hoboken Homeless Shelter could continue to operate as Hoboken's housing laws violated the principle of churches being able to offer shelter. In 1986 he dismissed a suit brought by New Jersey residents challenging New York State's jurisdiction over Liberty Island. He served as assignment judge of the Essex and Hudson vicinages, and the presiding judge of the Chancery Division in Passaic County. After his retirement as a judge in 2007 he became counsel at Williams, Caliri, Miller & Otley, P.C.

== Personal life and death ==
Humphreys married Joy Strong in December 1950, having met her at Dickinson College. They were both tournament bridge players. They had three children, and lived in Wayne until her death in 2012.

Humphreys died on September 19, 2024, at the age of 97.
