= Maple Shade High School =

High school in Burlington County, New Jersey, US

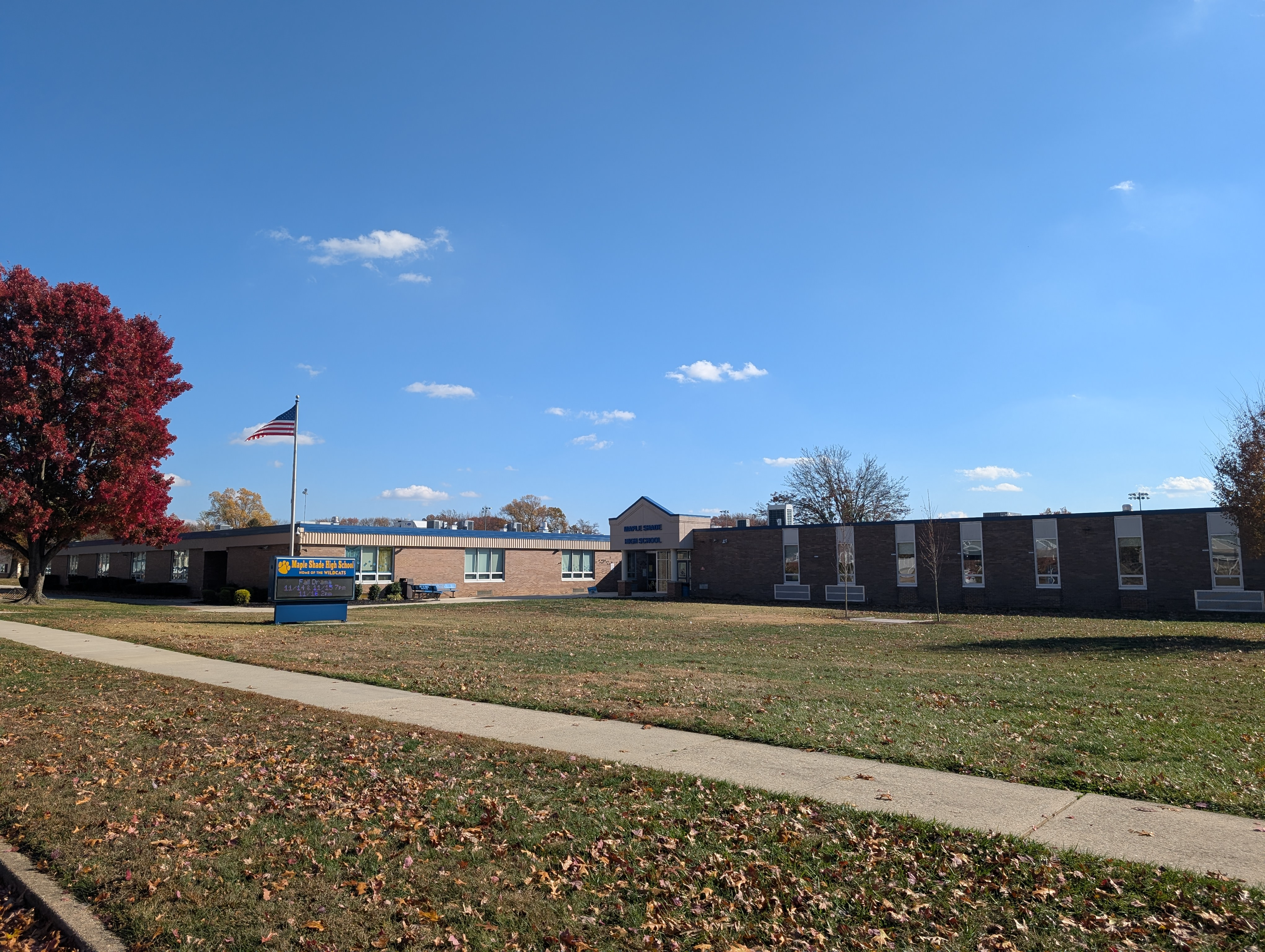

Location
- 180 Frederick Avenue; Maple Shade, Burlington County, New Jersey 08052; United States; 39.948468°N 75.006624°W

Information
- Type: Public high school
- Established: 1972
- School district: Maple Shade School District
- NCES School ID: 340966001104
- Principal: Rebecca Metzger
- Faculty: 84.7 FTEs
- Grades: 7-12
- Enrollment: 944 (as of 2024–25)
- Student to teacher ratio: 11.2:1
- Colors: Royal blue and gold
- Athletics conference: Burlington County Scholastic League (general); West Jersey Football League (football)
- Team name: Wildcats
- Website: www.mapleshade.org/o/mapleshadehs

Maple Shade High School is a comprehensive community public high school that serves students in seventh through twelfth grades from Maple Shade Township, in Burlington County, in the U.S. state of New Jersey, operating as the lone secondary school of the Maple Shade School District.

As of the 2024–25 school year, the school had an enrollment of 944 students and 84.7 classroom teachers (on an FTE basis), for a student–teacher ratio of 11.2:1. There were 416 students (44.1% of enrollment) eligible for free lunch and 86 (9.1% of students) eligible for reduced-cost lunch.

== History ==
Prior to the school's opening in 1972, the township's students had attended Merchantville High School in neighboring Camden County for 40 years. With the loss of Maple Shade students, the Merchantville School District closed its high school after the end of the 1971–72 school year and started sending its students to Pennsauken High School for grades nine through twelve.

Constructed at a cost of $4.6 million (equivalent to $35.4 million in 2025), the school for grades 7-12 was built on a 29-acre (12 ha) site and designed to accommodate a maximum enrollment of 1,350 students.

== Awards, recognition and rankings ==
The school was the 267th-ranked public high school in New Jersey out of 339 schools statewide in New Jersey Monthly magazine's September 2014 cover story on the state's "Top Public High Schools", using a new ranking methodology. The school had been ranked 281st in the state of 328 schools in 2012, after being ranked 301st in 2010 out of 322 schools listed. The magazine ranked the school 271st in 2008 out of 316 schools. The school was ranked 253rd in the magazine's September 2006 issue, which surveyed 316 schools across the state. Schooldigger.com ranked the school 189th out of 381 public high schools statewide in its 2011 rankings (a decrease of 19 positions from the 2010 ranking) which were based on the combined percentage of students classified as proficient or above proficient on the two components of the High School Proficiency Assessment (HSPA), mathematics (80.0%) and language arts literacy (91.9%).

== Academics ==
Students complete a quarterly assessment each marking period. The test scores make up twenty percent each of the student's final grade, with each academic quarter constituting twenty percent each. Academic awards are given as Principal's Honor Roll (4.0-5.2; nothing below 90)and Honor Roll (3.4-3.999; nothing below 80). For entrance into National Honor Society students must have a cumulative average of 3.8. In 2008, the MSHS school board approved a new honors program that would allow eighth grade students to begin taking high school courses. Acceptance into the honors program is based on not just on grades, but also more subjective criteria including student interviews, essays, and parent nominations. MPHS students have the opportunity to earn college credits through Burlington County College for taking certain courses at the school. The credits are potentially transferable to a student's future institution of higher education.

== Athletics ==
Maple Shade High School compete in the Burlington County Scholastic League (BCSL) a sports association under the jurisdiction of the New Jersey State Interscholastic Athletic Association (NJSIAA), comprised of public and private high schools covering Burlington, Mercer and Ocean counties in Central Jersey. With 419 students in grades 10–12, the school was classified by the NJSIAA for the 2022–24 school years as Group I South for most athletic competition purposes. The football team competes in the Freedom Division of the 94-team West Jersey Football League superconference and was classified by the NJSIAA as Group I South for football for 2024–2026, which included schools with 185 to 482 students. The mascot of Maple Shade is the Wildcat; the school's colors are royal blue and gold.

The boys cross country running team won the Group I state championship in 1993 and 1997.

The girls cross country team won the Group I state championship in 1995.

The boys' baseball team won the South Jersey Group I state sectional championship in 2008 against Pitman High School, their first sectional title victory since 1982.

The boys' soccer team reached the South Jersey Group I sectional finals in 2010 but lost 3–0 against Pitman High School. The boys' 2011 soccer team again reached the South Jersey Group I finals, this time losing to eventual state champion Haddon Township High School by a score of 3–2.

The field hockey team won the Central Jersey Group I state sectional title in 2012.

== Administration ==
The school's principal is Rebecca Metzger. Her administrative team includes three assistant principals and the athletic director.
