= Burlington County Institute of Technology Medford Campus =

High school in Burlington County, New Jersey, US

Location
- 10 Hawkin Road; Medford, Burlington County, New Jersey 08055; United States
- Coordinates: 39.895765°N 74.802010°W

Information
- Other names: BCIT Medford, Medford Tech
- Type: Vo-tech public high school
- School district: Burlington County Institute of Technology
- NCES School ID: 340249000998
- Principal: Michael Parker
- Faculty: 65.0 FTEs
- Grades: 9-12
- Enrollment: 896 (as of 2024–25)
- Student to teacher ratio: 13.8:1
- Colors: Red; White and Blue
- Athletics conference: Burlington County Scholastic League
- Team name: Jaguars
- Website: www.bcit.cc/o/bcitmcf

The Burlington County Institute of Technology Medford Campus (more commonly known as Medford Tech) is a four-year countywide vocational-technical public high school serving students in ninth through twelfth grades from Burlington County, in the U.S. state of New Jersey, as part of the Burlington County Institute of Technology. Located in Medford, the campus is one of two high schools in the district, along with the Westampton campus.

As of the 2024–25 school year, the school had an enrollment of 896 students and 65.0 classroom teachers (on an FTE basis), for a student–teacher ratio of 13.8:1. There were 258 students (28.8% of enrollment) eligible for free lunch and 69 (7.7% of students) eligible for reduced-cost lunch.

== Athletics ==
The BCIT Medford Jaguars compete in the Burlington County Scholastic League, an athletic conference comprised of public and private high schools located in Burlington County and the surrounding counties that operates under the aegis of the New Jersey State Interscholastic Athletic Association (NJSIAA) With 602 students in grades 10-12, the school was classified by the NJSIAA for the 2019–20 school year as Group II for most athletic competition purposes, which included schools with an enrollment of 486 to 758 students in that grade range.

== Administration ==
The school's principal is Michael Parker. His administration team includes two assistant principals.

== Notable alumni ==
- Myles Powell (born 1997; transferred), basketball player for the Seton Hall Pirates men's basketball team
