= Daniel Nester =

American writer, editor, and poet (born 1968)

- Born: February 29, 1968 (age 58); Portsmouth, Virginia, United States
- Education: Rutgers University-Camden
- Occupation: Writer
- Writing career
- Genres: Fiction, non-fiction, poetry

Daniel Murlin Nester (born February 29, 1968, in Portsmouth, Virginia) is an American writer, editor, and poet.

== Biography ==
Nester was raised in Maple Shade Township, New Jersey. He attended high school at Camden Catholic High School in Cherry Hill, New Jersey, and college at Rutgers University-Camden. He was an assistant professor of English at The College of Saint Rose, in Albany, New York, where he also curated the popular Frequency North reading series.

== Non-fiction ==
Nester is the author of two books about the musical group Queen, and his obsession with them: God Save My Queen: A Tribute and God Save My Queen II: The Show Must Go On. His other nonfiction work has appeared in numerous anthologies on gaming, poetry, and rock and roll.

== Poetry ==
His first book of poetry is The History of My World Tonight. His poetry has appeared in jubilat, Crazyhorse, Open City, Slope, Spoon River Poetry Review, Best American Poetry 2003, Poets & Writers, Time Out New York, and Bookslut.

== Editing and publishing ==
Nester published and edited the now-defunct online journal Unpleasant Event Schedule, and served as Assistant Web Editor for Sestinas for McSweeney’s. In the past he has edited for La Petite Zine, Ducky and Painted Bride Quarterly. He also served as editor and wrote the foreword to Words In Your Face: A Guided Tour Through Twenty Years of the New York City Poetry Slam Movement.
