= Berenice Benson Bentley =

American music educator

- Born: January 2, 1887; Oskaloosa, Iowa, U.S.
- Died: April 2, 1971 (aged 84); Claremont, California, U.S.
- Occupations: Music educator, composer

Berenice Benson Bentley (January 2, 1887 – April 2, 1971) was an American music educator and composer, based in Chicago, described in 1960 as "one of America's best known composers of music for young people".

== Early life and education ==
Bentley was born in Oskaloosa, Iowa, the daughter of Newman Josiah Bentley and Mary Isabella Howe Bentley. She graduated from Grinnell College.

== Career ==
Bentley taught and composed music for voice and piano. She published several compilations of short piano compositions for student use. "The beginning numbers are not melodically interesting," Jay W. Fay wrote in a 1931 review of her Melody Picture Book for Beginners, adding that "the material begins to gather interest melodically and harmonically, and most of it is well worth while." She taught at Intermont in Virginia in the summer of 1948, with the Leo Podolsky Piano Workshops in 1956, and played for music teachers in Claremont, California, in 1959 and 1960. She was a member of the National League of American Pen Women and the Musicians Club of Pomona Valley.

== Publications ==
- Woodland Vignettes (5 songs, lyrics by Rowena Bastin Bennett)
- Six Miniatures (1924; included "The Elf and the Fairy", "Swing Song", "October Woods", "Birthday Dance", "Slumber Song", "The Dreaming Child")
- "Minuet" (1929)
- A Melody Picture Book For Beginners (1930)
- Book of Bells for Piano
- "Birdling" (1938)
- "On an Old Plantation" and "Russian Lullaby" (1939)
- "Rondolette" and "Summertime Sketches" (1945)
- "Berceuse for Piano" (1947)
- "Frost Fairies" and "Sweet Sleep" (1948)
- Music in Playtime (1948, with Sophie B. Matthewson)
- Happy Times (1955, includes "Three Black Swans" and "A Little Dance")
- Little Songs to Play and Sing (1956)
- Piano Compositions of Berenice Benson Bentley (1958)
- Four Northern Sketches (1960)

== Personal life ==
Bentley lived in Belle Haven, Virginia, during World War II. She died in 1971, at the age of 84, in Claremont, California.
