= Rowena Bastin Bennett =

American writer

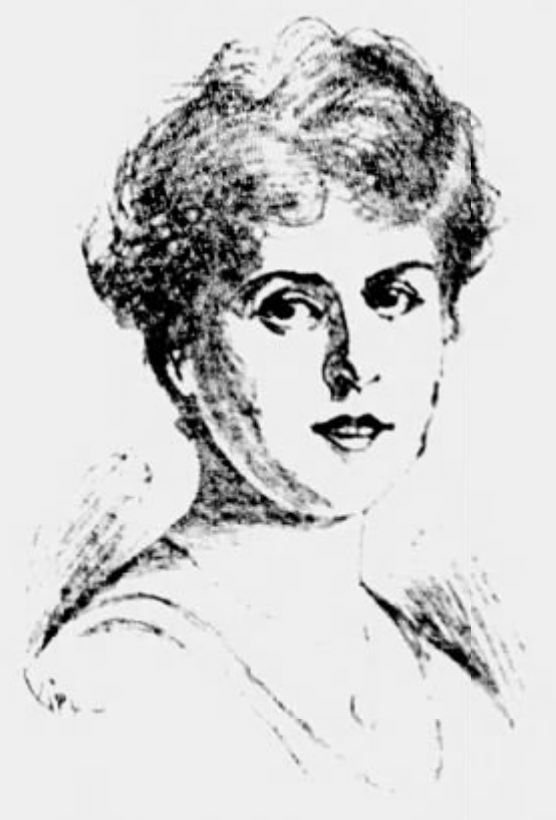
- Bennett, from a 1917 newspaper
- Born: Rowena Beardsley Bastin; July 29, 1896; Merchantville, New Jersey, U.S.
- Died: March 7, 1981 (aged 84); Cortland, New York, U.S.
- Occupations: Writer, poet, playwright

Rowena Beardsley Bastin Bennett (July 29, 1896 – March 7, 1981) was an American writer of stories, plays, and poetry for children.

== Early life and education ==
Bastin was born in Merchantville, New Jersey and raised in Highland Park, Illinois, the daughter of Edson Sewell Bastin and Abbie Beardsley Bastin. Her mother was a teacher. Her father was a botany professor who died when she was a baby, and her older brother was a geologist. Her great-grandfather John Jerome Beardsley was a lawyer who corresponded with Abraham Lincoln. She graduated from the University of Michigan with a degree in English literature.

== Career ==
Bennett wrote poetry, plays, and stories for children. Agatha L. Shea in the Chicago Tribune reviewed Bennett's 1930 book Around the Toadstool Table as "real poetry for children, not something of vague, indefinable charm which adults love, and wish that children would." Music educator Berenice Benson Bentley put some of Bennett's verse to music. Bennett judged a poetry contest in 1948. She adapted Puss in Boots for a Chicago theatrical production in 1954.

Bennett's poetry was widely published and anthologized. Her poem "Come Out and Join the Caroling" was featured on the cover of the December 1925 issue of St. Nicholas. Individual works by Bennett appeared in collections such as The Golden Flute (1932), The Big Golden Book of Elves and Fairies (1951), Four-Star Plays for Boys (1957), Piper, Pipe that Song Again (1965), Poems Children Will Sit Still For (1969), Poetry of Witches, Elves, and Goblins (1970), The Haunted House and Other Spooky Poems and Tales (1970), Poetry for Space Enthusiasts (1971), and Witching Time (1977).

== Publications ==
- Around a Toadstool Table: A Child’s Book of Verse (1930, illustrated by Lucille Webster Holling; a later edition was illustrated by Betty Fraser)
- Alphabet Book (1938)
- Story-teller Poems (1948, illustrated by Donald E. Cooke)
- Lots of Stories (1946)
- Happy Hour Stories (1946, illustrated by Sally De Frehn)
- Puss in Boots: A Three-Act Dramatization of the Old Fairy Tale (1954)
- Beyond Fire (poetry collection)
- Runner for the King (illustrated by Fiore Mastri)
- Teddy's Sailboat (illustrated by Fiore Mastri)
- Here Comes Christmas: A Book of Christmas Poems for Youngsters (1962)
- Creative Plays and Programs for the Holidays (1966)
- The Day Is Dancing and Other Poems (1968, illustrated by Raney Bennett)

== Personal life and legacy ==
Bastin married Kenneth Chisholm Bennett in 1917. They had three children. They moved to Galena, Illinois, in 1956. Her husband died in 1959, and she died in 1981, at the age of 84, in Cortland, New York. Poems by Bennett were included in The Random House Book of Poetry for Children (1983), Sing a Song of Popcorn (1988), Monster Soup and Other Spooky Poems (1992), and on a Baby Einstein product, Baby Shakespeare World of Poetry (2003).
