= Westampton, New Jersey =

Township in Burlington County, New Jersey, US

- Township
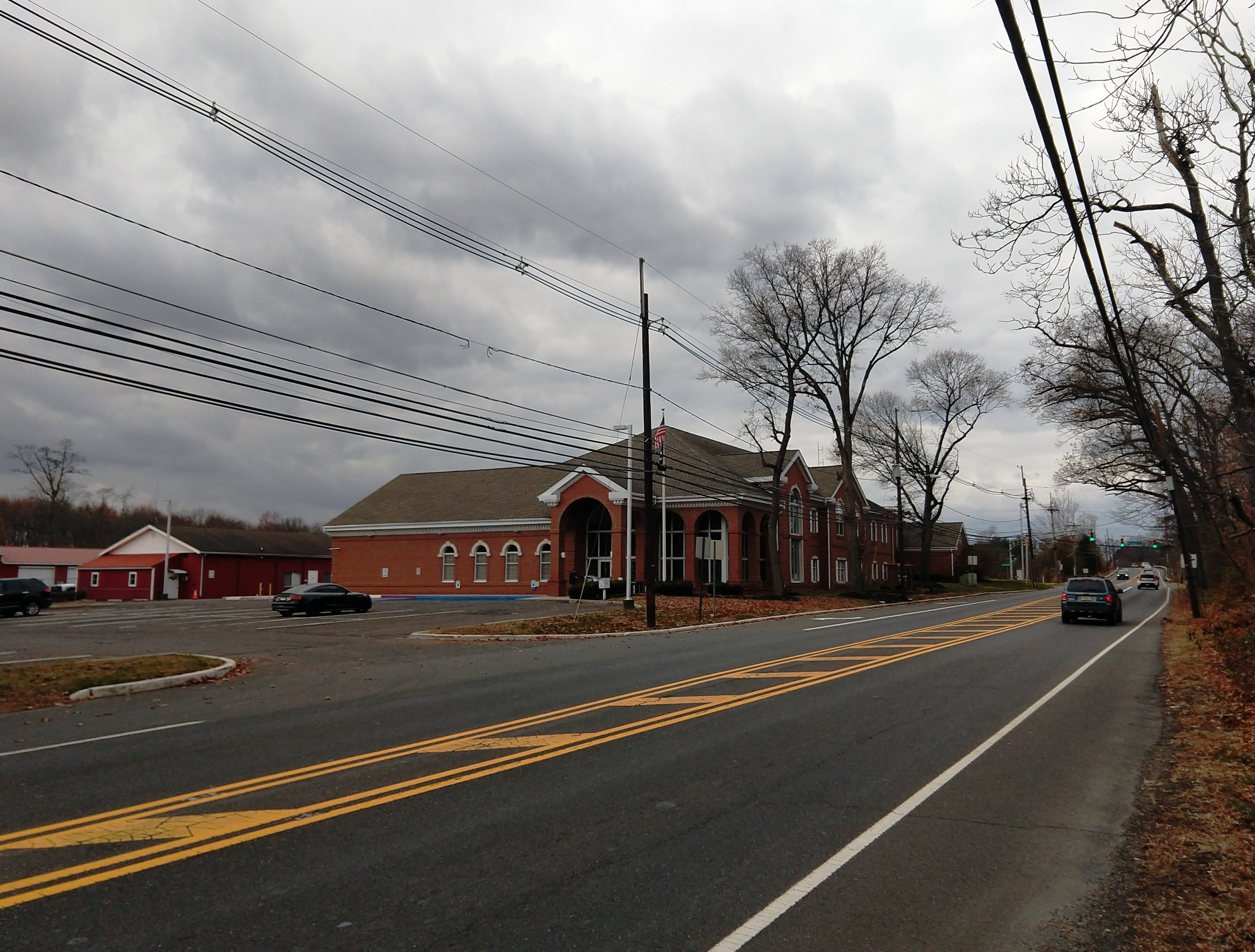
- Westampton Township Municipal Building

- Seal

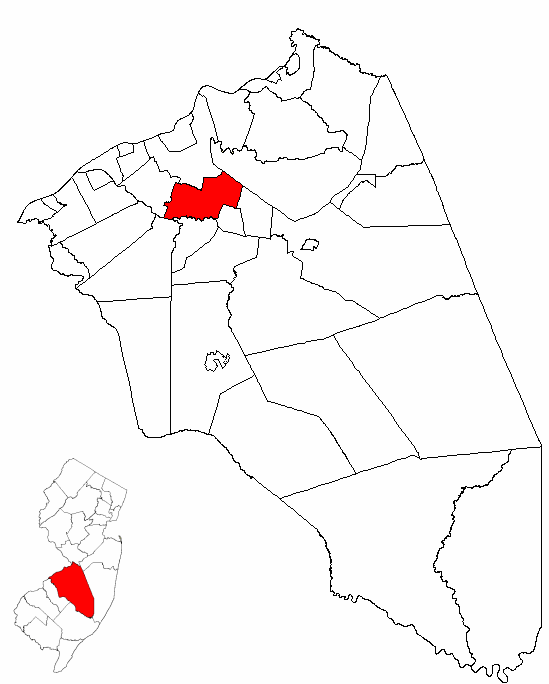
- Westampton Township highlighted in Burlington County. Inset map: Burlington County highlighted in the State of New Jersey.

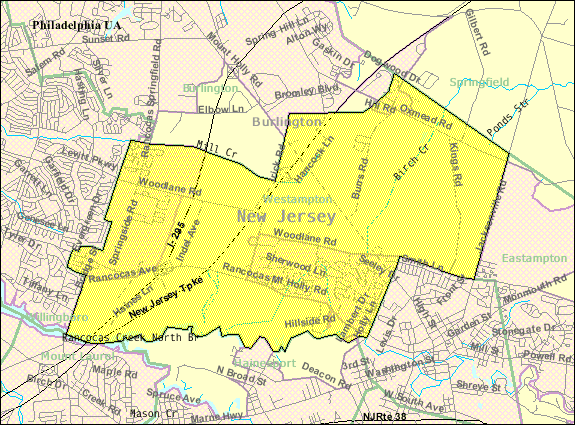
- Census Bureau map of Westampton Township, New Jersey

- Location in Burlington County Location in New Jersey Location in the United States
- Coordinates: 40.016732°N 74.820906°W
- Country: United States
- State: New Jersey
- County: Burlington
- Incorporated: March 6, 1850

Government
  - Type: Township
  - Body: Township committee
  - Mayor: Sandy Henley (D, term ends December 31, 2023)
  - Administrator: Wendy Gibson
  - Municipal clerk: Wendy Gibson (acting)

Area
  - Total: 11.10 sq mi (28.75 km^{2})
  - Land: 10.97 sq mi (28.42 km^{2})
  - Water: 0.13 sq mi (0.33 km^{2}) 1.15%
  - Rank: 200th of 565 in state 19th of 40 in county
- Elevation: 72 ft (22 m)

Population (2020)
  - Total: 9,121
  - Estimate (2023): 9,195
  - Rank: 261st of 565 in state 18th of 40 in county
  - Density: 831.1/sq mi (320.9/km^{2})
  - Rank: 404th of 565 in state 26th of 40 in county
- Time zone: UTC−05:00 (Eastern (EST))
  - Summer (DST): UTC−04:00 (Eastern (EDT))
- ZIP Code: 08060 – Mount Holly
- Area code: 609
- FIPS code: 3400578200
- GNIS feature ID: 0882103
- Website: www.westamptonnj.gov

Westampton is a township in Burlington County, in the U.S. state of New Jersey. As of the 2020 United States census, the township's population was 9,121, an increase of 308 (+3.5%) from the 2010 census count of 8,813, which in turn reflected an increase of 1,596 (+22.1%) from the 7,217 counted in the 2000 census. The township, and all of Burlington County, is a part of the Philadelphia area.

Westampton was incorporated as a township by an act of the New Jersey Legislature on March 6, 1850, from portions of Northampton Township (now known as Mount Holly Township). Portions of the township were taken to form Eastampton Township on February 11, 1880. Its name derives from its original location in the western portion of what was Northampton Township.

The township is the home of the National Weather Service Weather Forecast Office serving the Philadelphia area.

== Geography ==
According to the United States Census Bureau, the township had a total area of 11.10 square miles (28.75 km^{2}), including 10.97 square miles (28.42 km^{2}) of land and 0.13 square miles (0.33 km^{2}) of water (1.15%).

Unincorporated communities, localities and place names located partially or completely within the township include Rancocas, Timbuctoo and Woodlane.

The township borders the Burlington County municipalities of Burlington Township, Eastampton, Hainesport, Mount Holly, Mount Laurel, Springfield Township and Willingboro.

== Demographics ==
Historical population
Census	Pop.	Note	%±
1850	1,507		—
1860	1,313		−12.9%
1870	1,369		4.3%
1880	715	*	−47.8%
1890	688		−3.8%
1900	567		−17.6%
1910	564		−0.5%
1920	478		−15.2%
1930	491		2.7%
1940	573		16.7%
1950	716		25.0%
1960	1,114		55.6%
1970	2,680		140.6%
1980	3,383		26.2%
1990	6,004		77.5%
2000	7,217		20.2%
2010	8,813		22.1%
2020	9,121		3.5%
2023 (est.)	9,195		0.8%
Population sources: 1850–2000; 1850–1920 1850–1870; 1850 1870 1880–1890; 1890–1910 1910–1930; 1940–2000 2000; 2010 2020 * = Lost territory in previous decade.

=== 2010 census ===
The 2010 United States census counted 8,813 people, 3,195 households, and 2,428 families in the township. The population density was 799.4 per square mile (308.7/km^{2}). There were 3,291 housing units at an average density of 298.5 per square mile (115.3/km^{2}). The racial makeup was 61.00% (5,376) White, 25.45% (2,243) Black or African American, 0.19% (17) Native American, 6.90% (608) Asian, 0.03% (3) Pacific Islander, 2.26% (199) from other races, and 4.16% (367) from two or more races. Hispanic or Latino of any race were 8.84% (779) of the population.

Of the 3,195 households, 34.7% had children under the age of 18; 59.4% were married couples living together; 13.0% had a female householder with no husband present and 24.0% were non-families. Of all households, 19.9% were made up of individuals and 7.1% had someone living alone who was 65 years of age or older. The average household size was 2.76 and the average family size was 3.18.

24.4% of the population were under the age of 18, 7.7% from 18 to 24, 27.2% from 25 to 44, 30.3% from 45 to 64, and 10.4% who were 65 years of age or older. The median age was 39.3 years. For every 100 females, the population had 91.5 males. For every 100 females ages 18 and older there were 87.8 males.

The Census Bureau's 2006–2010 American Community Survey showed that (in 2010 inflation-adjusted dollars) median household income was $89,713 (with a margin of error of +/− $10,240) and the median family income was $97,080 (+/− $9,080). Men had a median income of $65,651 (+/− $7,331) versus $45,956 (+/− $4,844) for women. The per capita income for the borough was $38,334 (+/− $4,669). About 2.8% of families and 4.0% of the population were below the poverty line, including 5.6% of those under age 18 and 5.7% of those age 65 or over.

=== 2000 census ===
As of the 2000 United States census there were 7,217 people, 2,525 households, and 1,966 families residing in the township. The population density was 653.6 inhabitants per square mile (252.4/km^{2}). There were 2,581 housing units at an average density of 233.8 per square mile (90.3/km^{2}). The racial makeup of the township was 70.81% White, 21.27% African American, 0.28% Native American, 3.03% Asian, 0.04% Pacific Islander, 1.83% from other races, and 2.74% from two or more races. Hispanic or Latino of any race were 6.21% of the population.

There were 2,525 households, out of which 42.1% had children under the age of 18 living with them, 62.2% were married couples living together, 13.0% had a female householder with no spouse present, and 22.1% were non-families. 18.1% of all households were made up of individuals, and 5.3% had someone living alone who was 65 years of age or older. The average household size was 2.83 and the average family size was 3.24.

In the township the population was spread out, with 29.3% under the age of 18, 6.0% from 18 to 24, 33.4% from 25 to 44, 22.2% from 45 to 64, and 9.1% who were 65 years of age or older. The median age was 36 years. For every 100 females, there were 90.0 males. For every 100 females age 18 and over, there were 82.6 males.

The median income for a household in the township was $63,973, and the median income for a family was $69,656. Males had a median income of $46,536 versus $32,167 for females. The per capita income for the township was $26,594. About 2.7% of families and 2.5% of the population were below the poverty line, including 2.1% of those under age 18 and 4.9% of those age 65 or over.

== Government ==
=== Local government ===
Westampton Township is governed under the Township form of New Jersey municipal government, one of 141 municipalities (of the 564) statewide that use this form, the second-most commonly used form of government in the state. The Township Committee is comprised of five members, who are elected directly by the voters at-large in partisan elections to serve three-year terms of office on a staggered basis, with either one or two seats coming up for election each year as part of the November general election in a three-year cycle. At an annual reorganization meeting, the Township Committee selects one of its members to serve as Mayor and another as Deputy Mayor.

As of 2023, members of the Westampton Township Committee are Mayor Sandy V. Henley (D, term on committee and as mayor ends December 31, 2023), Jaime Mungo (D, term on committee and as mayor ends 2023), Nancy A. Burkley (R, 2024), Odise Carr (D, 2025), Genel Wright (D, 2024; elected to serve an unexpired term).

Genel Wright was appointed in September 2022 to fill the seat expiring in December 2024 that became vacant following the resignation of Anthony DeSilva. Wright served on an interim basis until the November 2022 general election, when she was chosen to serve the balance of the term of office.

In January 2022, the Township Committee chose Odise Carr from a list of three candidates submitted by the Democratic municipal committee to fill the vacant seat expiring in December 2022.

In January 2020, the Township Committee appointed Jaime Mungo to complete the term of office expiring in December 2020 that had been held by Linda A. Hynes until she resigned from office to take a seat on the Burlington County Board of Chosen Freeholders.

=== Federal, state and county representation ===
Westampton Township is located in the 3rd Congressional District and is part of New Jersey's 8th state legislative district.

For the 119th United States Congress, New Jersey's 3rd congressional district is currently represented Herb Conaway (D, Delran Township). New Jersey is represented in the United States Senate by Democrats Cory Booker (Newark, term ends 2027) and Andy Kim (Moorestown, term ends 2031).

For the 2026–2027 session, the 8th legislative district of the New Jersey Legislature is represented in the New Jersey Senate by Latham Tiver (R, Southampton Township) and in the General Assembly by Anthony Angelozzi (D, Hammonton) and Andrea Katz (D, Chesterfield Township).

Burlington County is governed by a Board of County Commissioners comprised of five members who are chosen at-large in partisan elections to serve three-year terms of office on a staggered basis, with either one or two seats coming up for election each year; at an annual reorganization meeting, the board selects a director and deputy director from among its members to serve a one-year term. As of 2026, Burlington County's Commissioners are: Director Felicia Hopson (D, Willingboro Township, term as commissioner ends December 31, 2027; term as director ends 2026), Deputy Director Allison Eckel (D, Medford, term as commissioner ends 2028; term as deputy director ends 2026), Randy Brolo (D, Lumberton, 2026; elected to an unexpired term), Tyler Burrell (D, Delran Township, 2027) and Tom Pullion (D, Edgewater Park, 2026).

Burlington County's constitutional officers are Clerk Joanne Schwartz (D, Southampton Township, 2028), Sheriff James H. Kostoplis (D, Bordentown, 2028) and Surrogate Brian J. Carlin (D, Burlington Township, 2026).

=== Politics ===
United States presidential election results for Westampton Township 2024 2020 2016 2012 2008 2004
Year	Republican		Democratic		Third party(ies)	
Year	No.	%	No.	%	No.	%
2024	1,497	31.66%	3,157	66.77%	74	1.57%
2020	1,606	29.61%	3,756	69.26%	61	1.12%
2016	1,453	31.94%	2,935	64.52%	161	3.54%
2012	1,368	30.58%	3,060	68.40%	46	1.03%
2008	1,448	31.27%	3,138	67.78%	44	0.95%
2004	1,640	41.78%	2,259	57.55%	26	0.66%

As of March 2011, there were a total of 5,540 registered voters in Westampton Township, of which 2,175 (39.3% vs. 33.3% countywide) were registered as Democrats, 1,115 (20.1% vs. 23.9%) were registered as Republicans and 2,249 (40.6% vs. 42.8%) were registered as Unaffiliated. There was one voter registered to another party. Among the township's 2010 Census population, 62.9% (vs. 61.7% in Burlington County) were registered to vote, including 83.2% of those ages 18 and over (vs. 80.3% countywide).

In the 2012 presidential election, Democrat Barack Obama received 3,060 votes here (67.9% vs. 58.1% countywide), ahead of Republican Mitt Romney with 1,368 votes (30.3% vs. 40.2%) and other candidates with 46 votes (1.0% vs. 1.0%), among the 4,509 ballots cast by the township's 5,848 registered voters, for a turnout of 77.1% (vs. 74.5% in Burlington County). In the 2008 presidential election, Democrat Barack Obama received 3,138 votes here (67.3% vs. 58.4% countywide), ahead of Republican John McCain with 1,448 votes (31.1% vs. 39.9%) and other candidates with 44 votes (0.9% vs. 1.0%), among the 4,661 ballots cast by the township's 5,556 registered voters, for a turnout of 83.9% (vs. 80.0% in Burlington County). In the 2004 presidential election, Democrat John Kerry received 2,259 votes here (57.4% vs. 52.9% countywide), ahead of Republican George W. Bush with 1,640 votes (41.7% vs. 46.0%) and other candidates with 26 votes (0.7% vs. 0.8%), among the 3,937 ballots cast by the township's 4,795 registered voters, for a turnout of 82.1% (vs. 78.8% in the whole county).

Gubernatorial election results for Westampton
Year	Republican		Democratic		Third party(ies)	
Year	No.	%	No.	%	No.	%
2025	1,166	28.11%	2,954	71.22%	28	0.68%
2021	1,052	33.96%	2,016	65.07%	30	0.97%
2017	1,027	36.26%	1,762	62.22%	43	1.52%
2013	1,410	53.71%	1,187	45.22%	28	1.07%
2009	1,162	41.34%	1,501	53.40%	148	5.27%
2005	1,028	40.19%	1,420	55.51%	110	4.30%

In the 2013 gubernatorial election, Republican Chris Christie received 1,410 votes here (52.7% vs. 61.4% countywide), ahead of Democrat Barbara Buono with 1,187 votes (44.4% vs. 35.8%) and other candidates with 28 votes (1.0% vs. 1.2%), among the 2,675 ballots cast by the township's 5,802 registered voters, yielding a 46.1% turnout (vs. 44.5% in the county). In the 2009 gubernatorial election, Democrat Jon Corzine received 1,501 ballots cast (52.9% vs. 44.5% countywide), ahead of Republican Chris Christie with 1,162 votes (41.0% vs. 47.7%), Independent Chris Daggett with 115 votes (4.1% vs. 4.8%) and other candidates with 33 votes (1.2% vs. 1.2%), among the 2,835 ballots cast by the township's 5,592 registered voters, yielding a 50.7% turnout (vs. 44.9% in the county).

United States Senate election results for Westampton1
Year	Republican		Democratic		Third party(ies)	
Year	No.	%	No.	%	No.	%
2024	1,350	29.49%	3,140	68.59%	88	1.92%
2018	1,296	32.60%	2,442	61.43%	237	5.96%
2012	1,310	30.42%	2,964	68.83%	32	0.74%
2006	978	39.76%	1,441	58.58%	41	1.67%

United States Senate election results for Westampton2
Year	Republican		Democratic		Third party(ies)	
Year	No.	%	No.	%	No.	%
2020	1,611	30.26%	3,660	68.75%	53	1.00%
2014	882	32.96%	1,754	65.55%	40	1.49%
2013	585	33.26%	1,166	66.29%	8	0.45%
2008	1,473	34.55%	2,731	64.06%	59	1.38%

== Education ==
For pre-kindergarten through eighth grade, public school students attend the Westampton Township Schools. As of the 2021–22 school year, the district, comprised of two schools, had an enrollment of 937 students and 87.2 classroom teachers (on an FTE basis), for a student–teacher ratio of 10.7:1. The schools in the district (with 2021–22 enrollment data from the National Center for Education Statistics) are Holly Hills Elementary School with 403 students in pre-kindergarten through 3rd grade and Westampton Intermediate School / Westampton Middle School with 524 students in PreK and grades 4 to 8.

For ninth through twelfth grades, public school students attend the Rancocas Valley Regional High School, a comprehensive regional public high school/district, which also serves students from the communities of Eastampton, Hainesport, Lumberton and Mount Holly. As of the 2021–22 school year, the high school had an enrollment of 2,048 students and 140.3 classroom teachers (on an FTE basis), for a student–teacher ratio of 14.6:1. The school is located in Mount Holly Township. The district's board of education is comprised of nine members who are elected directly by voters to serve three-year terms of office on a staggered basis, with three seats up for election each year as part of the November general election. Seats on the board are allocated based on the population of the five constituent municipalities, with two seats assigned to Westampton.

Burlington County Institute of Technology is a countywide public vocational-technical school district offering training to students throughout Burlington County, with a campus located in Westampton and the Burlington County Institute of Technology Medford Campus in Medford.

== Parks and Recreation ==
The northern portion of Rancocas State Park lies within Westampton.

== Transportation ==
=== Roads and highways ===
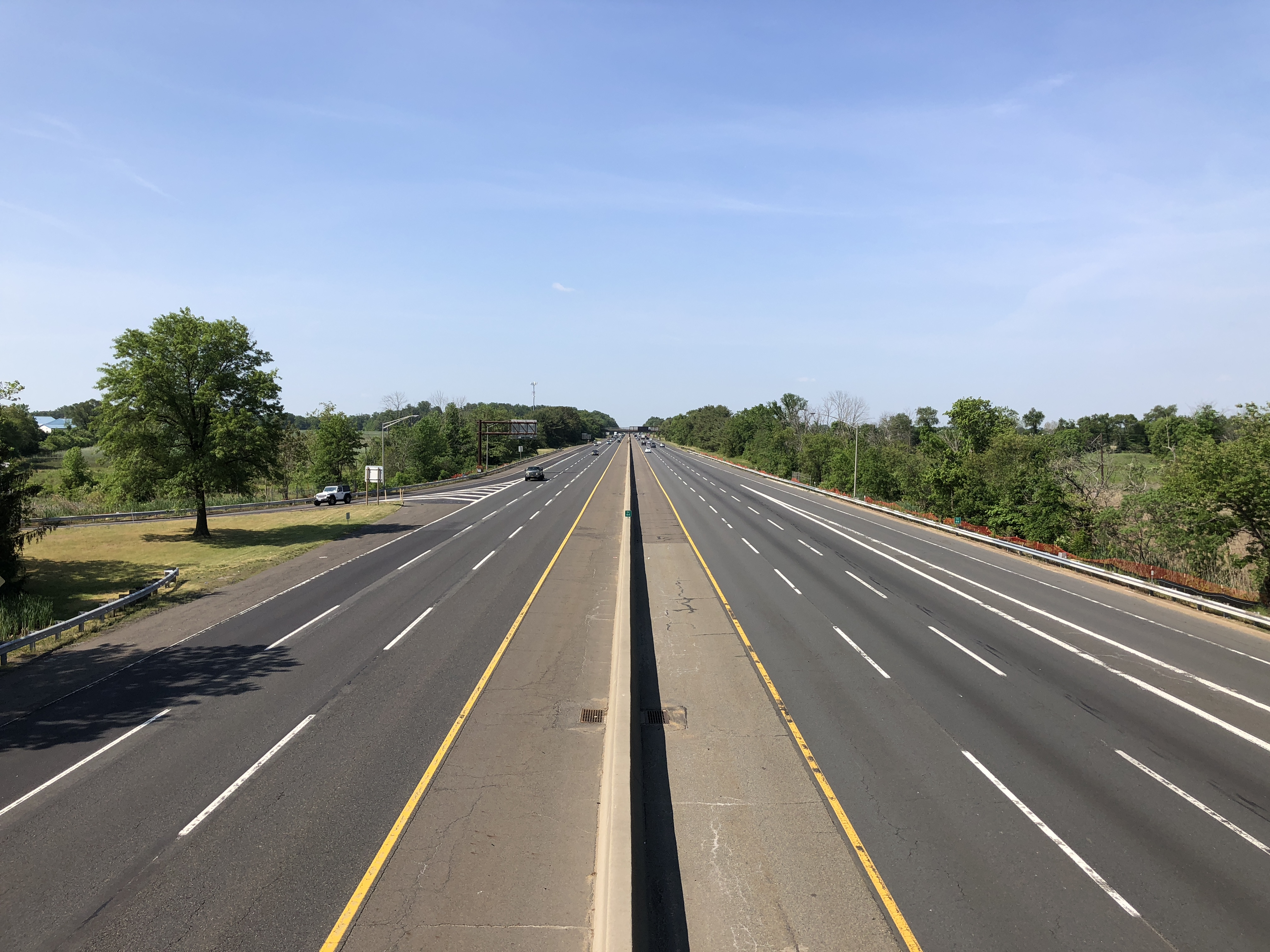
View south along the New Jersey Turnpike in Westampton

As of May 2010, the township had a total of 55.24 miles (88.90 km) of roadways, of which 32.47 miles (52.26 km) were maintained by the municipality, 15.84 miles (25.49 km) by Burlington County and 2.83 miles (4.55 km) by the New Jersey Department of Transportation and 4.10 miles (6.60 km) by the New Jersey Turnpike Authority.

Westampton hosts two major highways. A 4.1-mile (6.6 km) section of the New Jersey Turnpike, including the four-lane toll gate for Exit 5, is located within the township. I-295 also runs through the northwestern section of the township for about 2 1/2 miles (4.0 km), including one interchange, Exit 45. The most significant county road is County Road 541, which passes through the municipality from the northwestern section to the southeastern corner.

=== Public transportation ===
NJ Transit provides bus service on route 413 between Burlington and Camden.

BurLink bus service is offered on the B1 route (between Beverly and Pemberton) and on the B2 route (between Beverly and Westampton).

Academy Bus provides service from a park-and-ride facility near Exit 5 off the New Jersey Turnpike to the Port Authority Bus Terminal and other street service in New York City and to both Jersey City and the Wall Street area in Lower Manhattan.

== Notable people ==
People who were born in, residents of, or otherwise closely associated with Westampton Township include:

- Carmine DeSopo (born 1940), politician who served one term in the New Jersey General Assembly from 1996 to 1998, where he represented the 7th Legislative District
- Jordan Gershowitz (born 1987), television writer, executive producer and author
- Henry Rowan (1923–2015), engineer and philanthropist for whom Rowan University is named
- José F. Sosa (born 1950), Republican Party politician who served in the New Jersey General Assembly from 1992 to 1994
- Jean Stanfield, politician who was elected to the New Jersey General Assembly to represent the 8th Legislative District in November 2019
- Kelsi Worrell (born 1994), competition swimmer specializing in the butterfly who won the gold medal in the 100-meter butterfly at the 2015 Pan American Games in Toronto
