= Ulysses Simpson Wiggins =

American doctor and civil rights activist (1896–1966)

Ulysses S. Wiggins
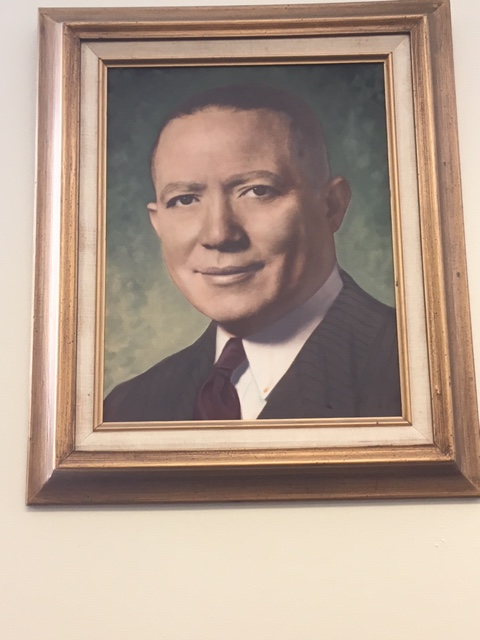

President of the Camden County Branch NAACP
- In office 1941 (Co-Founder) – 1966
- Succeeded by: John W. Robinson

Personal details
- Born: 1896 Americus, Georgia
- Died: April 8, 1966 (aged 69–70) Camden, New Jersey
- Spouse: Alice Turner (m. 1933)
- Education: Lincoln University, 1918. University of Michigan, 1924.
- Profession: Doctor

Ulysses Simpson Wiggins (1896 – April 8, 1966) was an American doctor, civil rights activist, president of the Camden County branch of the NAACP, and president of the New Jersey Conference of Branches of the NAACP. Wiggins was a proponent of desegregating Camden's schools during his time as president of the Camden NAACP, and he was a well-respected leader in his community.

== Early life and education ==
Ulysses Wiggins was born in Americus, Georgia in 1896 to parents Randall and Hannah Wiggins, and he was one of 10 children. After spending his childhood and teenage years in Americus, he attended Lincoln University, where he received his A.B. He then went on to earn his M.D. at the University of Michigan in 1924. Wiggins served his internship in Mercy Hospital in Philadelphia, and later worked at Mount Sinai Hospital in New York, before coming to Camden in 1928 to practice medicine. In 1933, he married Alice Turner, and together, the couple moved to 1025 South 4th St. in Camden. They were regular and active members of the Saint Augustine Episcopal Church nearby. Ulysses Wiggins's known siblings include Mr. Ernest Wiggins, Mrs. Eliah Banks, and Mrs. Agnes Simms.

== Career and civil service ==
When Ulysses Wiggins moved to Camden in 1928, he began working for Cooper Hospital, setting up a private practice which was affiliated with the hospital. He also became very involved as a member of the community in Camden fighting for civil rights. In 1941, he co-founded and revivified the Camden chapter of the NAACP, along with Walter K. Gordon, Marvel Dansbury, and Edward Grayson. He served as president of the Camden NAACP from 1941 until his death in 1966.

As well as his medical practice, Wiggins served in other roles, such as being a physician and medical examiner for the Camden Highway Department, the Camden school system, and the New Jersey State Athletic Commission. Wiggins was a professional member of medical societies at the local and national level, including the South Jersey, Camden County, New Jersey, and American Medical Societies. Wiggins had also served as president of the New Jersey State Conference of Branches of the National Medical Association, as well as having been president of the South Jersey Medical Association and New Jersey Medical Association.

Wiggins was also very concerned about education in Camden, and fought for many years to integrate the city's schools and rezone districts so that students would be sent to the school closest to them. He also worked to get more teachers into Camden's schools. In 1948, the Camden NAACP, headed by Wiggins, filed a suit against the Division Against Discrimination (a state agency formed by the Department of Education to address complaints of discrimination in schools) and threatened to have funds withheld from Camden's schools. Soon after, the Camden Board of Education rezoned the school district, and students no longer had to attend segregated schools.

In 1950 Wiggins assisted Martin Luther King Jr. in a civil rights case after King was refused service in Maple Shade, NJ.

== Death and legacy ==
Ulysses Wiggins had a cerebral vascular accident in 1964, but after partially recovering, he continued with his regular work schedule. Two years later, Wiggins had a stroke, after which he was hospitalized. He was a patient at Cooper Hospital from the time of his stroke on March 26, to his death on April 8, 1966. Wiggins was survived by his wife, Alice, and was buried in Sunset Memorial Park in Pennsauken.

After Ulysses Wiggins's death, several places in Camden were named in his honor. On November 2, 1969, the Bergen Square School was renamed for Dr. Wiggins, "in honor of a leader in the city's black community." The Ulysses S. Wiggins Elementary School is located at the corner of 4th and Mount Vernon Streets in Camden.

In the early 1970s, the Paul Robeson Library at Rutgers University-Camden created the Ulysses S. Wiggins Collection with books, journals, and newspapers focusing on African Americans and Africa. Wiggins Waterfront Park located in Camden at Riverside Drive and Martin Luther King Boulevard is named for Ulysses Wiggins.
