= Merchantville High School =

High school in Camden County, New Jersey, US (1929–1972)

Location
- 130 South Center Street; Merchantville, Camden County, New Jersey 08109; United States
- 39.949°N 75.049°W

Information
- School type: Public, high school
- Established: 1929
- Closed: 1972; 54 years ago
- School district: Merchantville School District
- Grades: 9–12

Merchantville High School was a four-year public high school that operated from 1929 until 1972 in Merchantville, in Camden County, in the U.S. state of New Jersey, operating as part of the Merchantville School District.

== History ==
The school, which opened in 1929, served students from Merchantville and from the neighboring communities of Cherry Hill and Pennsauken Township, as well as Maple Shade Township in Burlington County.

Students from Pennsauken Township left the high school with the opening of Pennsauken High School in September 1959.

With the loss of Maple Shade students to the new Maple Shade High School in 1972, Merchantville closed its high school after the end of the 1971–72 school year and started sending its students to Pennsauken High School for grades nine through twelve.

== Athletics ==
The boys' basketball team won the Group II state championship in 1947 vs. Weehawken High School and in 1965 vs. Clifford Scott High School. The 1965 team won the Group II title with a 57-54 win in the finals against Clifford Scott of East Orange at Atlantic City Convention Hall

== Notable alumni ==
- George Dempsey (1929–2017), professional basketball player who played five seasons (1954–1959) in the National Basketball Association as a member of the Philadelphia Warriors and Syracuse Nationals
- Bob Greacen (born 1947), professional basketball player who played for the Milwaukee Bucks and New York Nets
- Burrell Ives Humphreys (1927–2024), New Jersey Superior Court judge and county prosecutor who was the lead prosecutor in the second murder trial of Rubin Carter, which resulted in Carter's conviction in December 1976
- Frank Seward (1921–2004, class of 1939), professional baseball player who played for the New York Giants in 1943 and 1944
- Wyatt Tee Walker (1928–2018), executive director of the Southern Christian Leadership Conference and one of the founders of the Congress for Racial Equality, who is credited with planning the Birmingham campaign in 1963
- George E. Williams, politician who served in the New Jersey General Assembly from the 7th Legislative District from 1994 to 1996
