= Maple Shade School District =

School district in Burlington County, New Jersey, US

Address
- 170 Frederick Avenue Maple Shade Township, Burlington County, New Jersey, 08052; United States
- Coordinates: 39.952721°N 74.994508°W

District information
- Grades: Pre-K to 12
- Superintendent: Beth Norcia
- Business administrator: Michael Blake
- Schools: 4

Students and staff
- Enrollment: 2,370 (as of 2021–22)
- Faculty: 219.0 FTEs
- Student–teacher ratio: 10.8:1

Other information
- District Factor Group: CD
- Website: www.mapleshade.org
Ind.	Per pupil	District spending	Rank (*)	K-12 average	%± vs. average
1A	Total Spending	$17,764	32	$18,891	−6.0%
1	Budgetary Cost	13,564	31	14,783	−8.2%
2	Classroom Instruction	8,283	39	8,763	−5.5%
6	Support Services	2,040	32	2,392	−14.7%
8	Administrative Cost	1,396	19	1,485	−6.0%
10	Operations & Maintenance	1,449	24	1,783	−18.7%
13	Extracurricular Activities	326	15	268	21.6%
16	Median Teacher Salary	63,016	32	64,043
Data from NJDoE 2014 Taxpayers' Guide to Education Spending. *Of K-12 districts with 1,800-3,500 students. Lowest spending=1; Highest=68

The Maple Shade School District is a comprehensive community public school district that serves students in pre-kindergarten through twelfth grade from Maple Shade Township, in Burlington County, in the U.S. state of New Jersey.

As of the 2021–22 school year, the district, comprising four schools, had an enrollment of 2,370 students and 219.0 classroom teachers (on an FTE basis), for a student–teacher ratio of 10.8:1.

The district is classified by the New Jersey Department of Education as being in District Factor Group "CD", the sixth highest of eight groupings. District Factor Groups organize districts statewide to allow comparison by common socioeconomic characteristics of the local districts. From lowest socioeconomic status to highest, the categories are A, B, CD, DE, FG, GH, I and J.

== History ==
Prior to the opening of Maple Shade High School in 1972, the township's students had been sent for 40 years to Merchantville High School in neighboring Camden County. With the loss of Maple Shade students, Merchantville closed its high school after the end of the 1971-72 school year and started sending its students to Pennsauken High School for grades nine through twelve.

== Schools ==
Schools in the district (with 2021–22 enrollment data from the National Center for Education Statistics) are:

Elementary schools

- Howard R. Yocum Elementary School with 565 students in grades PreK to 1
  - Yvonne Reitz, principal
- Maude M. Wilkins Elementary School with 534 students in grades 2-4
  - Steve Ormsby, principal
- Ralph J. Steinhauer Elementary School with 342 students in grades 5-6
  - Christopher Edwards, principal

High school

- Maple Shade High School with 888 students in grades 7-12
  - Matthew LaGrou, principal

== Administration ==
Core members of the district's administration are:

- Beth Norcia, superintendent
- Michael Blake, business administrator and board secretary

== Board of education ==
The district's board of education, comprised of nine members, sets policy and oversees the fiscal and educational operation of the district through its administration. As a Type II school district, the board's trustees are elected directly by voters to serve three-year terms of office on a staggered basis, with three seats up for election each year held (since 2012) as part of the November general election. The board appoints a superintendent to oversee the district's day-to-day operations and a business administrator to supervise the business functions of the district.
