= Merchantville, New Jersey =

Borough in Camden County, New Jersey, US

- Borough
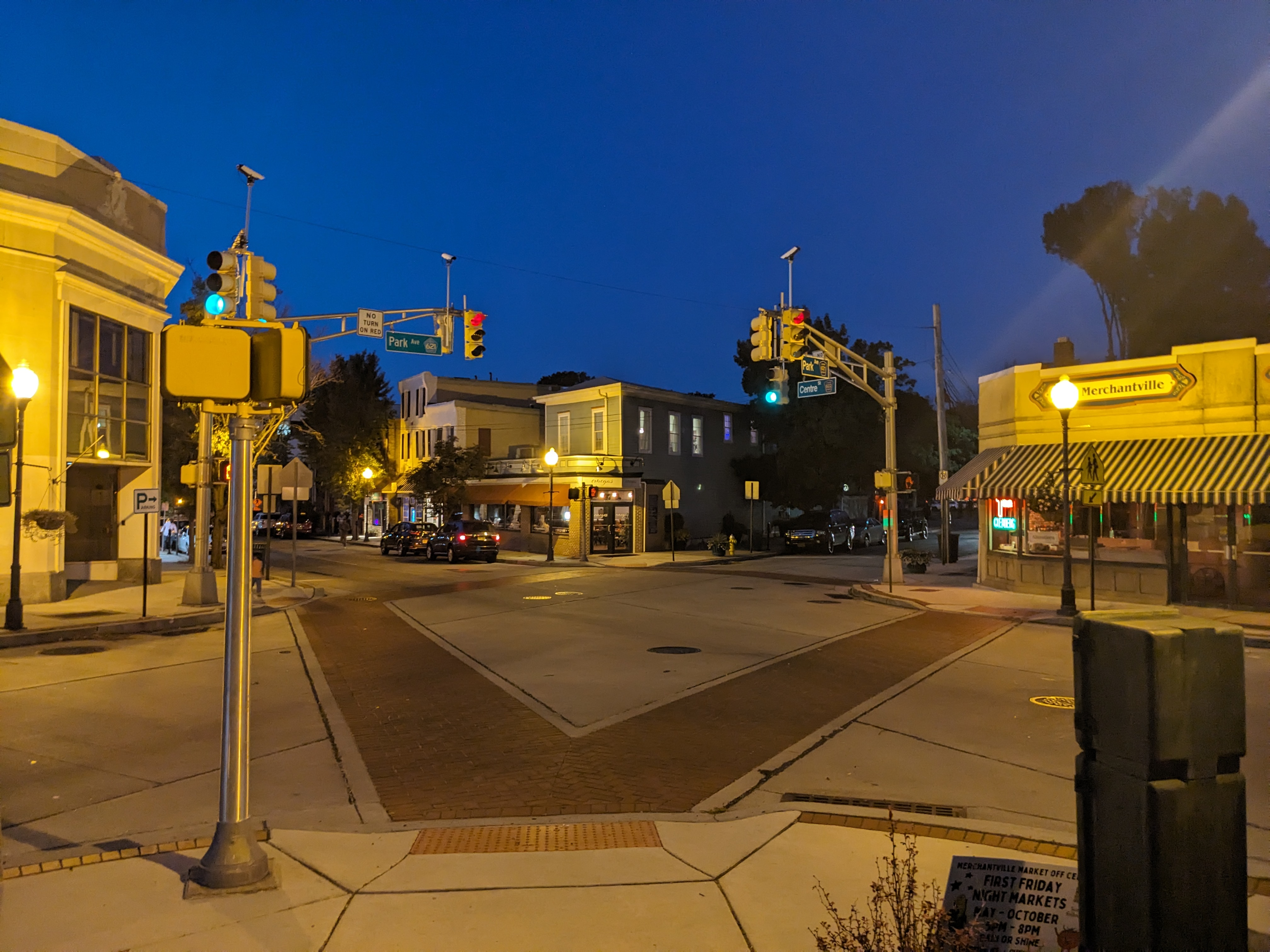
- Downtown Merchantville, New Jersey

- logo

- Merchantville highlighted in Camden County. Inset: Location of Camden County in the State of New Jersey

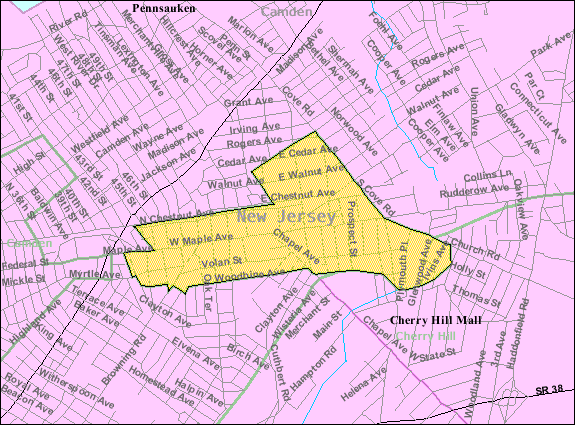
- Census Bureau map of Merchantville, New Jersey

- Location in Camden County Location in New Jersey Location in the United States
- Coordinates: 39.950222°N 75.050337°W
- Country: United States
- State: New Jersey
- County: Camden
- Incorporated: March 3, 1874

Government
  - Type: Borough
  - Body: Borough Council
  - Mayor: Edward F. Brennan (D, term ends December 31, 2026)
  - Municipal clerk: Denise Brouse

Area
  - Total: 0.59 sq mi (1.54 km^{2})
  - Land: 0.59 sq mi (1.54 km^{2})
  - Water: 0 sq mi (0.00 km^{2}) 0.00%
  - Rank: 542nd of 565 in state 31st of 37 in county
- Elevation: 82 ft (25 m)

Population (2020)
  - Total: 3,820
  - Estimate (2023): 3,823
  - Rank: 419th of 565 in state 27th of 37 in county
  - Density: 6,437/sq mi (2,485/km^{2})
  - Rank: 83rd of 565 in state 5th of 37 in county
- Time zone: UTC−05:00 (Eastern (EST))
  - Summer (DST): UTC−04:00 (Eastern (EDT))
- ZIP Code: 08109
- Area code: 856
- FIPS code: 3400745510
- GNIS feature ID: 0885297
- Website: www.merchantvillenj.gov

Merchantville is a borough in Camden County, in the U.S. state of New Jersey. As of the 2020 United States census, the borough's population was 3,820, a decrease of one person from the 2010 census count of 3,821, which in turn reflected an increase of 20 (+0.5%) from the 3,801 counted in the 2000 census.

The borough had the 22nd-highest property tax rate in New Jersey in 2020, with an equalized rate of 4.367% in 2020, compared to 3.470% in the county as a whole and a statewide average of 2.279%.

== History ==
Merchantville was incorporated as a borough by an act of the New Jersey Legislature on March 3, 1874, from portions of Delaware Township (now Cherry Hill) and the now-defunct Stockton Township.

While one source attributes the borough's name to a family named Merchant, Francis F. Eastlack, in his History of Merchantville, tells the story of the four developers of Merchantville—Matthias Homer, John Louty, Samuel McFadden and Frederick Gerker—meeting and discussing names, when it was suggested "Gentlemen, as you are all merchants, why not call it Merchantville?"

== Geography ==
According to the United States Census Bureau, Merchantville borough had a total area of 0.59 square miles (1.54 km^{2}), all of which was land.

The borough borders the Camden County municipalities of Cherry Hill and Pennsauken Township.

== Demographics ==
Historical population
Census	Pop.	Note	%±
1870	245		—
1880	439		79.2%
1890	1,225		179.0%
1900	1,608		31.3%
1910	1,996		24.1%
1920	2,749		37.7%
1930	3,592		30.7%
1940	3,679		2.4%
1950	4,183		13.7%
1960	4,075		−2.6%
1970	4,425		8.6%
1980	3,972		−10.2%
1990	4,095		3.1%
2000	3,801		−7.2%
2010	3,821		0.5%
2020	3,820		0.0%
2023 (est.)	3,823	▲	0.1%
Population sources:1870 1880–2000 1880–1920; 1880–1890 1890–1910; 1910–1930 1940–2000; 2000 2010 2020

=== 2020 census ===
As of the 2020 census, Merchantville had a population of 3,820. The median age was 39.9 years. 21.8% of residents were under the age of 18 and 16.8% of residents were 65 years of age or older. For every 100 females there were 89.7 males, and for every 100 females age 18 and over there were 86.0 males age 18 and over.

100.0% of residents lived in urban areas, while 0.0% lived in rural areas.

There were 1,562 households in Merchantville, of which 29.2% had children under the age of 18 living in them. Of all households, 39.9% were married-couple households, 17.7% were households with a male householder and no spouse or partner present, and 34.8% were households with a female householder and no spouse or partner present. About 31.1% of all households were made up of individuals and 13.7% had someone living alone who was 65 years of age or older.

There were 1,699 housing units, of which 8.1% were vacant. The homeowner vacancy rate was 1.5% and the rental vacancy rate was 6.8%.

Racial composition as of the 2020 census
Race	Number	Percent
White	2,482	65.0%
Black or African American	450	11.8%
American Indian and Alaska Native	22	0.6%
Asian	121	3.2%
Native Hawaiian and Other Pacific Islander	1	0.0%
Some other race	374	9.8%
Two or more races	370	9.7%
Hispanic or Latino (of any race)	724	19.0%

=== 2010 census ===
The 2010 United States census counted 3,821 people, 1,574 households, and 966 families in the borough. The population density was 6,371.3 per square mile (2,460.0/km^{2}). There were 1,688 housing units at an average density of 2,814.6 per square mile (1,086.7/km^{2}). The racial makeup was 76.58% (2,926) White, 13.01% (497) Black or African American, 0.37% (14) Native American, 2.28% (87) Asian, 0.05% (2) Pacific Islander, 4.42% (169) from other races, and 3.30% (126) from two or more races. Hispanic or Latino of any race were 11.62% (444) of the population.

Of the 1,574 households, 28.5% had children under the age of 18; 41.7% were married couples living together; 15.1% had a female householder with no husband present and 38.6% were non-families. Of all households, 32.0% were made up of individuals and 12.5% had someone living alone who was 65 years of age or older. The average household size was 2.41 and the average family size was 3.09.

22.5% of the population were under the age of 18, 8.3% from 18 to 24, 28.6% from 25 to 44, 27.7% from 45 to 64, and 12.9% who were 65 years of age or older. The median age was 38.6 years. For every 100 females, the population had 91.1 males. For every 100 females ages 18 and older there were 88.5 males.

The Census Bureau's 2006–2010 American Community Survey showed that (in 2010 inflation-adjusted dollars) median household income was $62,358 (with a margin of error of +/− $9,850) and the median family income was $85,909 (+/− $16,985). Males had a median income of $49,926 (+/− $36,924) versus $41,369 (+/− $15,495) for females. The per capita income for the borough was $34,308 (+/− $4,408). About 11.7% of families and 11.1% of the population were below the poverty line, including 23.7% of those under age 18 and 6.0% of those age 65 or over.

=== 2000 census ===
As of the 2000 United States census there were 3,801 people, 1,524 households, and 946 families residing in the borough. The population density was 6,317.2 inhabitants per square mile (2,439.1/km^{2}). There were 1,607 housing units at an average density of 2,670.8 per square mile (1,031.2/km^{2}). The racial makeup of the borough was 85.90% White, 7.42% African American, 0.29% Native American, 2.10% Asian, 2.84% from other races, and 1.45% from two or more races. Hispanic or Latino of any race were 5.47% of the population.

There were 1,524 households, out of which 32.1% had children under the age of 18 living with them, 45.1% were married couples living together, 12.9% had a female householder with no husband present, and 37.9% were non-families. 32.0% of all households were made up of individuals, and 11.6% had someone living alone who was 65 years of age or older. The average household size was 2.48 and the average family size was 3.19.

In the borough the age distribution of the population shows 25.7% under the age of 18, 6.8% from 18 to 24, 31.5% from 25 to 44, 22.1% from 45 to 64, and 13.8% who were 65 years of age or older. The median age was 37 years. For every 100 females, there were 89.1 males. For every 100 females age 18 and over, there were 84.6 males.

The median income for a household in the borough was $49,392, and the median income for a family was $60,652. Males had a median income of $43,375 versus $30,771 for females. The per capita income for the borough was $25,589. About 5.8% of families and 6.8% of the population were below the poverty line, including 9.4% of those under age 18 and 3.0% of those age 65 or over.

== Government ==
=== Local government ===
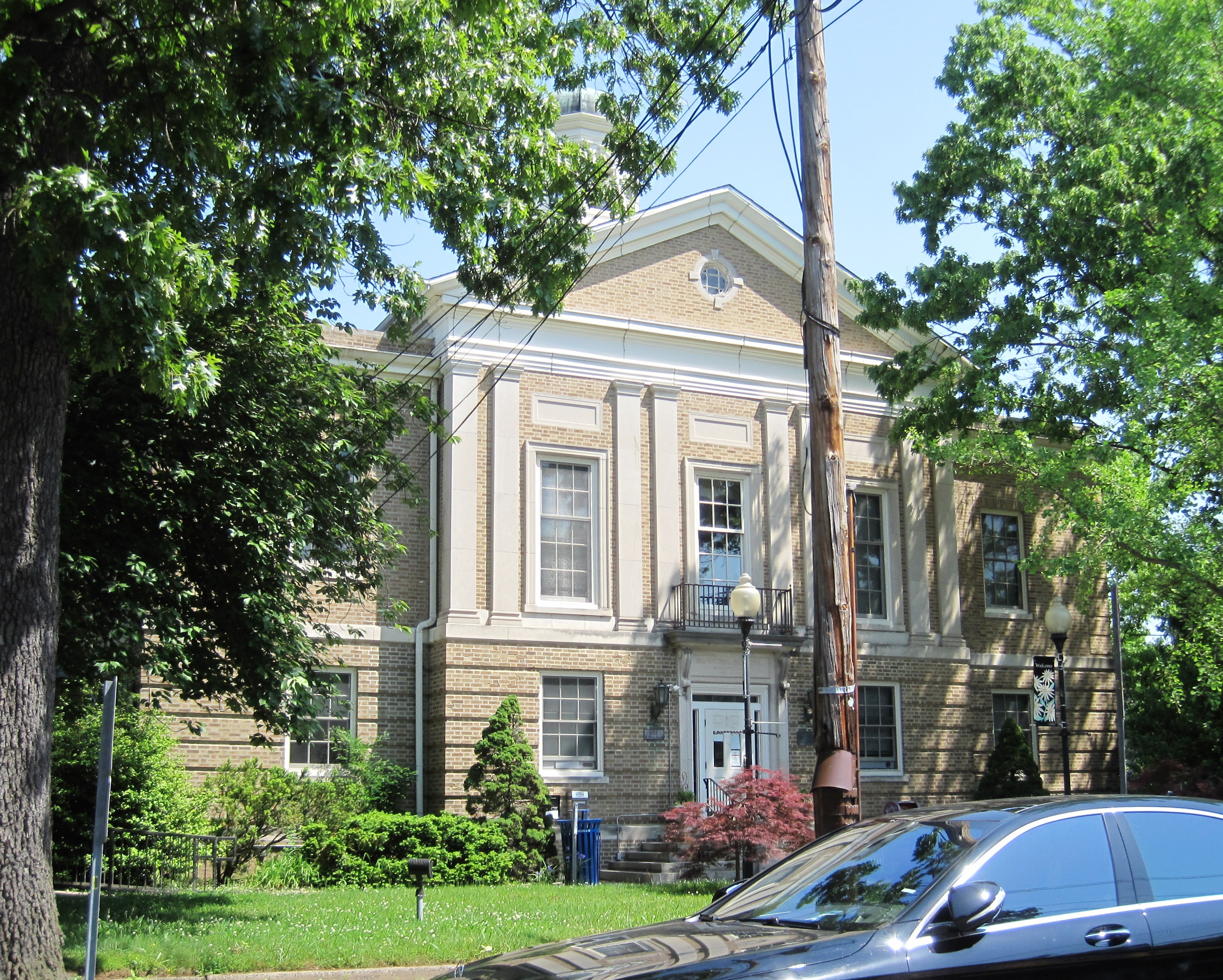
Merchantville Municipal Building

Merchantville is governed under the borough form of New Jersey municipal government, one of 218 municipalities (of the 564) statewide that use this form, the most commonly used form of government in the state. The governing body is comprised of a mayor and a borough council, with all positions elected at-large on a partisan basis as part of the November general election. A mayor is elected directly by the voters to a four-year term of office. The borough council includes six members elected to serve three-year terms on a staggered basis, with two seats coming up for election each year in a three-year cycle.

The borough form of government used by Merchantville is a "weak mayor / strong council" government in which council members act as the legislative body with the mayor presiding at meetings and voting only in the event of a tie. The mayor can veto ordinances subject to an override by a two-thirds majority vote of the council. The mayor makes committee and liaison assignments for council members, and most appointments are made by the mayor with the advice and consent of the council.

As of 2023, the mayor of Merchantville Borough is Democrat Edward F. "Ted" Brennan, whose term of office ends December 31, 2026. Members of the Borough Council are Council President Sean H. Fitzgerald (D, 2023), Andrew O. McLoone (D, 2023), Cindy Morales (D, 2024), Anthony J. Perno III (D, 2025), Daniel J. Sperrazza (D, 2024) and Raymond H. Woods III (D, 2025).

In May 2018, the borough council appointed Sean Fitzgerald to fill the seat expiring in December 2020 that had been held by Katherine Swann until she resigned from office. Fitzgerald served on an interim basis until the November 2018 general election when he was elected to serve the balance of the term of office.

=== Federal, state and county representation ===
Merchantville is located in the 1st Congressional District and is part of New Jersey's 5th state legislative district.

For the 119th United States Congress, New Jersey's 1st congressional district is represented by Donald Norcross (D, Camden). New Jersey is represented in the United States Senate by Democrats Cory Booker (Newark, term ends 2027) and Andy Kim (Moorestown, term ends 2031).

For the 2026–2027 session, the 5th legislative district of the New Jersey Legislature is represented in the State Senate by Nilsa Cruz-Perez (D, Barrington) and in the General Assembly by Bill Moen (D, Camden) and William Spearman (D, Camden).

Camden County is governed by a Board of County Commissioners composed of seven members chosen at-large in partisan elections for three-year terms on a staggered basis by the residents of the county, with either two or three seats up for election each year as part of the November general election. At a reorganization meeting held in January after each election, the newly constituted Board of Commissioners selects one member to serve as Director and another as Deputy Director, each serving a one-year term in that role. As of 2025, Camden County's Commissioners are: Commissioner Director Louis Cappelli Jr. (D, Collingswood, 2026), Commissioner Deputy Director Edward T. McDonnell (D, Pennsauken Township, 2025), Virginia Ruiz Betteridge (D, Runnemede, 2025), Almar Dyer (D, Pennsauken Township, 2027), Melinda Kane (D, Cherry Hill, 2027), Jeffrey L. Nash (D, Winslow Township, 2027), and Jonathan L. Young Sr. (D, Berlin Township, 2026).

Camden County's constitutional officers are: Clerk Pamela Rosen Lampitt (D, Cherry Hill, 2029) Sheriff Chuck Billingham (D, Gloucester City, 2027) and Surrogate Michelle Gentek-Mayer (D, Gloucester Township, 2025).

=== Politics ===
As of March 2011, there were a total of 2,610 registered voters in Merchantville, of which 990 (37.9%) were registered as Democrats, 489 (18.7%) were registered as Republicans and 1,129 (43.3%) were registered as Unaffiliated. There were 2 voters registered as either Libertarians or Greens.

Gubernatorial election results for Merchantville
Year	Republican		Democratic		Third party(ies)	
Year	No.	%	No.	%	No.	%
2025	378	23.83%	1,195	75.35%	13	0.82%
2021	421	34.45%	788	64.48%	13	1.06%
2017	339	34.17%	622	62.70%	31	3.13%
2013	560	55.89%	418	41.72%	24	2.40%
2009	534	42.01%	637	50.12%	100	7.87%
2005	445	39.66%	628	55.97%	49	4.37%

In the 2012 presidential election, Democrat Barack Obama received 65.9% of the vote (1,190 cast), ahead of Republican Mitt Romney with 32.8% (592 votes), and other candidates with 1.4% (25 votes), among the 1,822 ballots cast by the borough's 1,970 registered voters (15 ballots were spoiled), for a turnout of 92.5%. In the 2008 presidential election, Democrat Barack Obama received 63.8% of the vote (1,274 cast), ahead of Republican John McCain, who received around 33.4% (667 votes), with 1,998 ballots cast among the borough's 2,533 registered voters, for a turnout of 78.9%. In the 2004 presidential election, Democrat John Kerry received 57.9% of the vote (1,107 ballots cast), outpolling Republican George W. Bush, who received around 37.2% (711 votes), with 1,912 ballots cast among the borough's 2,461 registered voters, for a turnout percentage of 77.7.

United States presidential election results for Merchantville
Year	Republican		Democratic		Third party(ies)	
Year	No.	%	No.	%	No.	%
2024	552	28.54%	1,352	69.91%	30	1.55%
2020	633	29.79%	1,458	68.61%	34	1.60%
2016	534	29.44%	1,206	66.48%	74	4.08%
2012	592	32.76%	1,190	65.86%	25	1.38%
2008	667	33.38%	1,274	63.76%	57	2.85%
2004	711	37.19%	1,107	57.90%	94	4.92%

In the 2013 gubernatorial election, Republican Chris Christie received 55.9% of the vote (560 cast), ahead of Democrat Barbara Buono with 41.7% (418 votes), and other candidates with 2.4% (24 votes), among the 1,028 ballots cast by the borough's 2,757 registered voters (26 ballots were spoiled), for a turnout of 37.3%. In the 2009 gubernatorial election, Democrat Jon Corzine received 50.1% of the vote (637 ballots cast), ahead of both Republican Chris Christie with 42.0% (534 votes) and Independent Chris Daggett with 4.5% (57 votes), with 1,271 ballots cast among the borough's 2,609 registered voters, yielding a 48.7% turnout.

United States Senate election results for Merchantville1
Year	Republican		Democratic		Third party(ies)	
Year	No.	%	No.	%	No.	%
2024	531	27.99%	1,342	70.74%	24	1.27%
2018	508	33.84%	903	60.16%	90	6.00%
2012	561	32.11%	1,158	66.29%	28	1.60%
2006	500	40.00%	715	57.20%	35	2.80%

United States Senate election results for Merchantville2
Year	Republican		Democratic		Third party(ies)	
Year	No.	%	No.	%	No.	%
2020	639	30.36%	1,435	68.17%	31	1.47%
2014	363	34.51%	665	63.21%	24	2.28%
2013	238	36.96%	402	62.42%	4	0.62%
2008	693	37.36%	1,139	61.40%	23	1.24%

== Education ==
Students in public school for pre-kindergarten through eighth grade attend the Merchantville School District at Merchantville Elementary School. As of the 2023–24 school year, the district, comprised of one school, had an enrollment of 400 students and 35.5 classroom teachers (on an FTE basis), for a student–teacher ratio of 11.3:1.

Merchantville had its own high school, Merchantville High School, which operated from 1929 until 1972, when it was shut down. At that point high school students attended Pennsauken High School in Pennsauken Township. The commissioner of the New Jersey Department of Education approved the district's proposal and beginning in September 2015 Merchantville began sending students to Haddon Heights High School for grades 9–12, joining students from Barrington and Lawnside, who already attended the school. As of the 2023–24 school year, the high school had an enrollment of 942 students and 80.0 classroom teachers (on an FTE basis), for a student–teacher ratio of 11.8:1.

St. Peter School is a K–8 elementary school that opened in 1927 and operates under the auspices of the Roman Catholic Diocese of Camden.

== Transportation ==
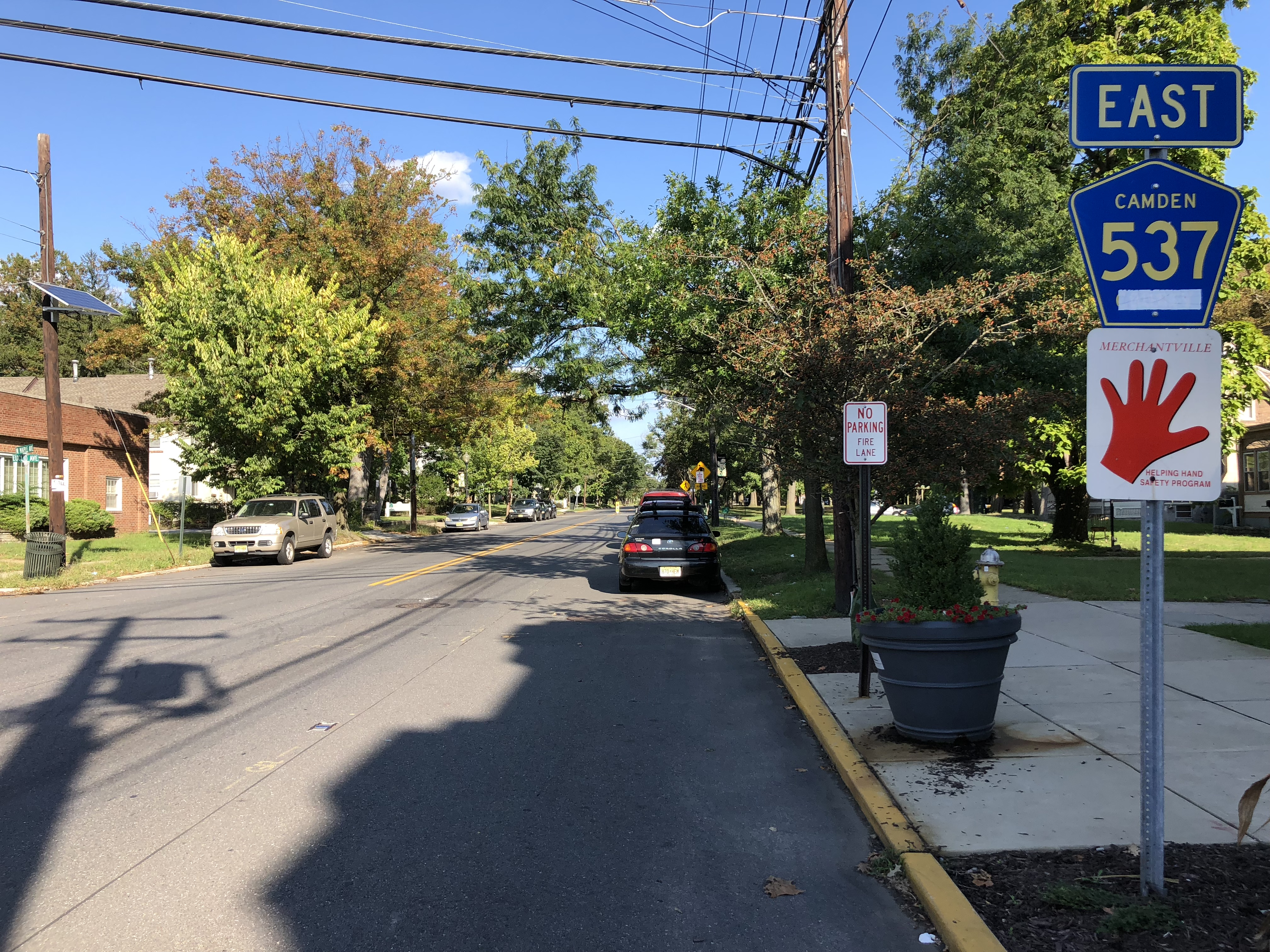
County Route 537 eastbound in Merchantville

=== Roads and highways ===
As of May 2010, the borough had a total of 12.84 miles (20.66 km) of roadways, of which 8.32 miles (13.39 km) were maintained by the municipality and 4.52 miles (7.27 km) by Camden County.

No Interstate, U.S. or state highways directly serve Merchantville, though U.S. Route 130 comes closest, passing by about two blocks from the borough's west end. The most significant road passing through the borough is County Route 537.

=== Public transportation ===
NJ Transit offers bus service in the borough on the 404, and 405 and 407 routes to Camden with connecting bus and rail services into Philadelphia. Passenger rail service to Merchantville ended in the late 1960s.

== Notable people ==
People who were born in, residents of, or otherwise closely associated with Merchantville include:

- Alfred L. Banyard (1908–1992), seventh bishop of the Episcopal Diocese of New Jersey, serving from 1955 to 1973
- Rowena Bastin Bennett (1896–1981), writer of stories, plays, and poetry for children
- Al Besselink (1923–2017), professional golfer who played on the PGA Tour in the 1950s and 1960s
- Alexander G. Cattell (1816–1894), one of Merchantville's earliest developers, he represented New Jersey in the United States Senate from 1866 to 1871
- George Arthur Crump (1871–1918), hotelier and golf course architect primarily known for designing and building Pine Valley Golf Club
- George Dempsey (1929–2017), professional basketball player who played point guard in the NBA for the Philadelphia Warriors and Syracuse Nationals
- Don Evans (1938–2003), African-American playwright, director, actor and educator
- William Joseph Fallon (born 1944), United States Navy admiral who was Commander of United States Central Command prior to retiring in 2008
- Charles G. Garrison (1849–1924), physician, lawyer, and judge who served as Associate Justice of the New Jersey Supreme Court from 1888 to 1893 and from 1896 to 1900
- Bob Greacen (born 1947), former professional basketball player who played for the Milwaukee Bucks and the New York Nets
- Hannah Hidalgo (born 2005), college basketball player for the Notre Dame Fighting Irish women's basketball team
- Burrell Ives Humphreys (1927–2024), former New Jersey Superior Court judge and county prosecutor who was the lead prosecutor in the second murder trial of Rubin Carter, which resulted in Carter's conviction in December 1976
- John Kasper (1929–1998), Ku Klux Klan member and segregationist who took a militant stand against racial integration during the civil rights movement
- Greg Mark (born 1967), former defensive end and linebacker who played in the NFL for the Philadelphia Eagles and Miami Dolphins
- Francis F. Patterson Jr. (1867–1935), politician who represented New Jersey's 1st congressional district in the United States House of Representatives from 1920 to 1927
- William T. Read (1878–1954), lawyer, President of the New Jersey Senate, and Treasurer of New Jersey
- Stephen H. Sholes (1911–1968), record industry executive at RCA Victor whose signings included Elvis Presley
- Albert W. Van Duzer (1917–1999), bishop of the Episcopal Diocese of New Jersey, serving from 1973 to 1982
- Ethan Van Sciver (born 1974), comics artist and social media personality
- Jersey Joe Walcott (1914–1994), world heavyweight champion boxer, actor, and Sheriff of Camden County
- Dr. Wyatt Tee Walker (1928–2018), pastor of Canaan Baptist Church in Harlem and former executive director of the Southern Christian Leadership Conference (1960–1964)
- Bruce A. Wallace (1905–1977), politician who served in the New Jersey Senate from 1942 to 1944 and from 1948 to 1955
- Charles A. Wolverton (1880–1969), politician who represented New Jersey's 1st congressional district in the United States House of Representatives from 1927 to 1959
