= Burlington County Institute of Technology =

School district in Burlington County, New Jersey, US

Address
- 695 Woodlane Road Westampton, Burlington County, New Jersey, 08060; United States
- Coordinates: 40.00362°N 74.789169°W

District information
- Grades: Vocational
- Superintendent: Ashanti Holley
- Business administrator: Andrew C. Willmott
- Schools: 2

Students and staff
- Enrollment: 2,067 (as of 2023–24)
- Faculty: 154.3 FTEs
- Student–teacher ratio: 13.4:1

Other information
- Website: www.bcit.cc
Ind.	Per pupil	District spending	Rank (*)	Vocational average	%± vs. average
1A	Total Spending	$21,157	8	$18,891	12.0%
1	Budgetary Cost	15,760	7	17,296	−8.9%
2	Classroom Instruction	8,331	10	9,045	−7.9%
6	Support Services	1,706	7	2,269	−24.8%
8	Administrative Cost	1,830	6	2,353	−22.2%
10	Operations & Maintenance	3,110	12	3,014	3.2%
13	Extracurricular Activities	781	17	464	68.3%
16	Median Teacher Salary	59,008	5	65,035
Data from NJDoE 2014 Taxpayers' Guide to Education Spending. *Of Vocational districts with any number of students. Lowest spending=1; Highest=21

The Burlington County Institute of Technology (BCIT) is a county-wide public school district that serves the vocational and technical education needs of students at the high school and post-secondary level in Burlington County, in the U.S. state of New Jersey. BCIT's more than 2,000 students come from 38 sending school districts throughout the county.

BCIT has campuses in Medford and Westampton townships. Admission to BCIT is based on a competitive admissions test. The district develops apprenticeship and job training programs with local businesses and educational institutions.

As of the 2023–24 school year, the district, composed of two schools, had an enrollment of 2,067 students and 154.3 classroom teachers (on an FTE basis), for a student–teacher ratio of 13.4:1.

== Campuses ==
The district's two campuses (with 2023–24 enrollment data from the National Center for Education Statistics) are:

- Burlington County Institute of Technology Medford Campus which served 835 students)
  - Michael Parker, principal
- Burlington County Institute of Technology Westampton Campus which served 1,234 students
  - Joseph Venuto, principal

== Programs ==
BCIT offers educational programs in a broad range of fields:

- High tech: Electronics, Computer Science Applications, Computer Assisted Drafting and Office Technologies, Robotics, Pre-engineering, A+ and NET+.
- Traditional majors: Automotive Technology, Printing/Graphics Communication, Welding, Drafting, Heating Ventilation and Air Conditioning, Fleet Maintenance Mechanics and Auto Body Repair are certified by the respective industries. Cosmetology and Health Occupations must pass licensing exams upon completion of their educational programs. Building Trade, Electrical Trade and Office Technology students in the high school program enroll in apprenticeships during their senior year.
- Other: Geospatial Technologies, Veterinarian Assistant, Ornamental Horticulture, Marketing, Culinary Arts, Advertising, Art and Design, Early Childhood Education and Child Care, Fashion Design and Fabrication, Law and Public Safety and Sports Medicine.

== Administration ==
Core members of the district's administration are:

- Ashanti Holley, superintendent of schools
- Andrew C. Willmott, business administrator and board secretary

== Board of education ==
The district's board of education consists of the county superintendent of schools and six public members who set policy and oversee the fiscal and educational operation of the district through its administration. As a Type I school district, the board's trustees are appointed by the Burlington County Board of County Commissioners to serve four-year terms of office on a staggered basis, with either one or two members up for reappointment each year. The board appoints a superintendent to oversee the district's day-to-day operations and a business administrator to supervise the business functions of the district.
