= Maple Shade Township, New Jersey =

Township in Burlington County, New Jersey, US

- Township
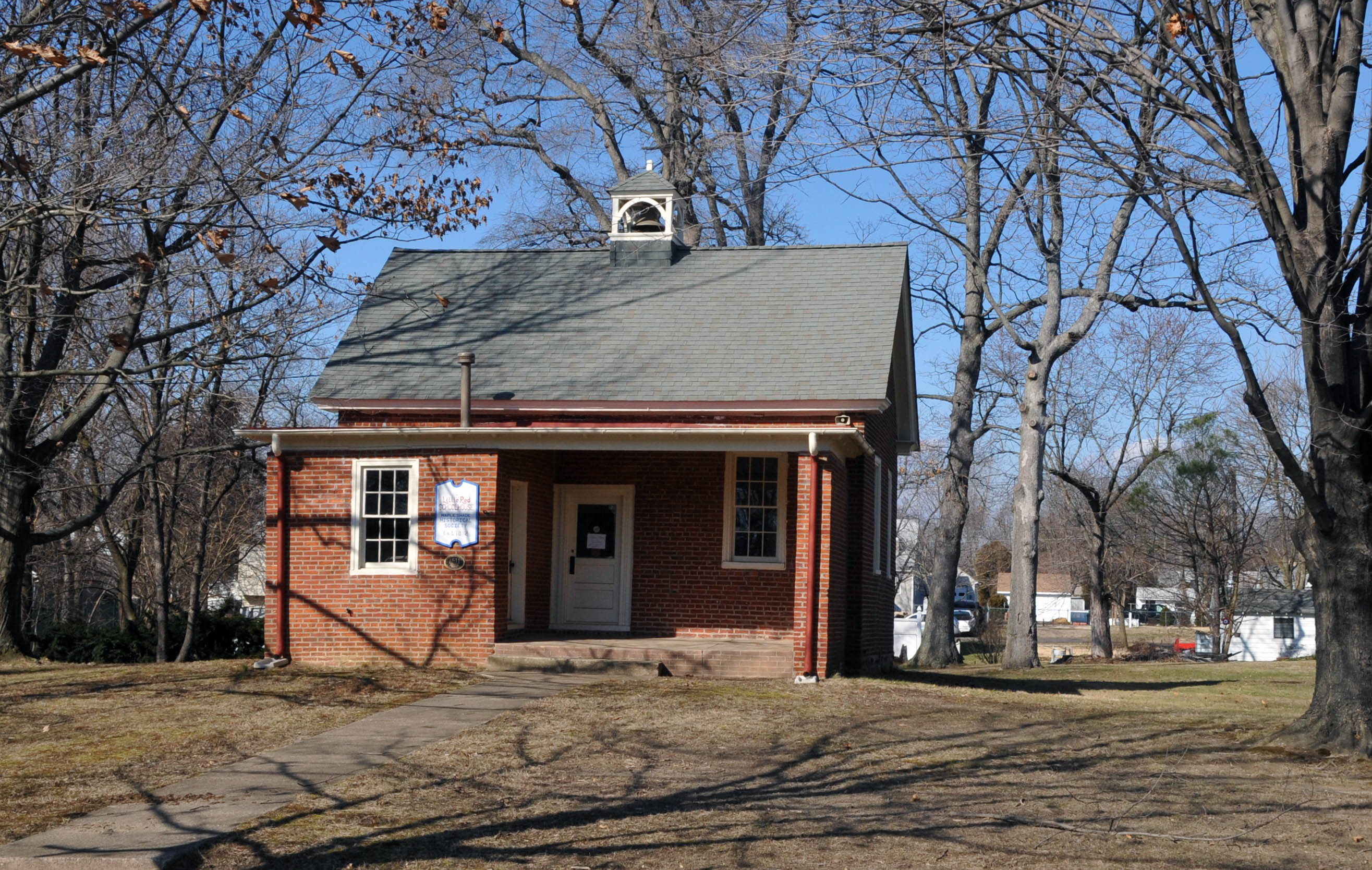
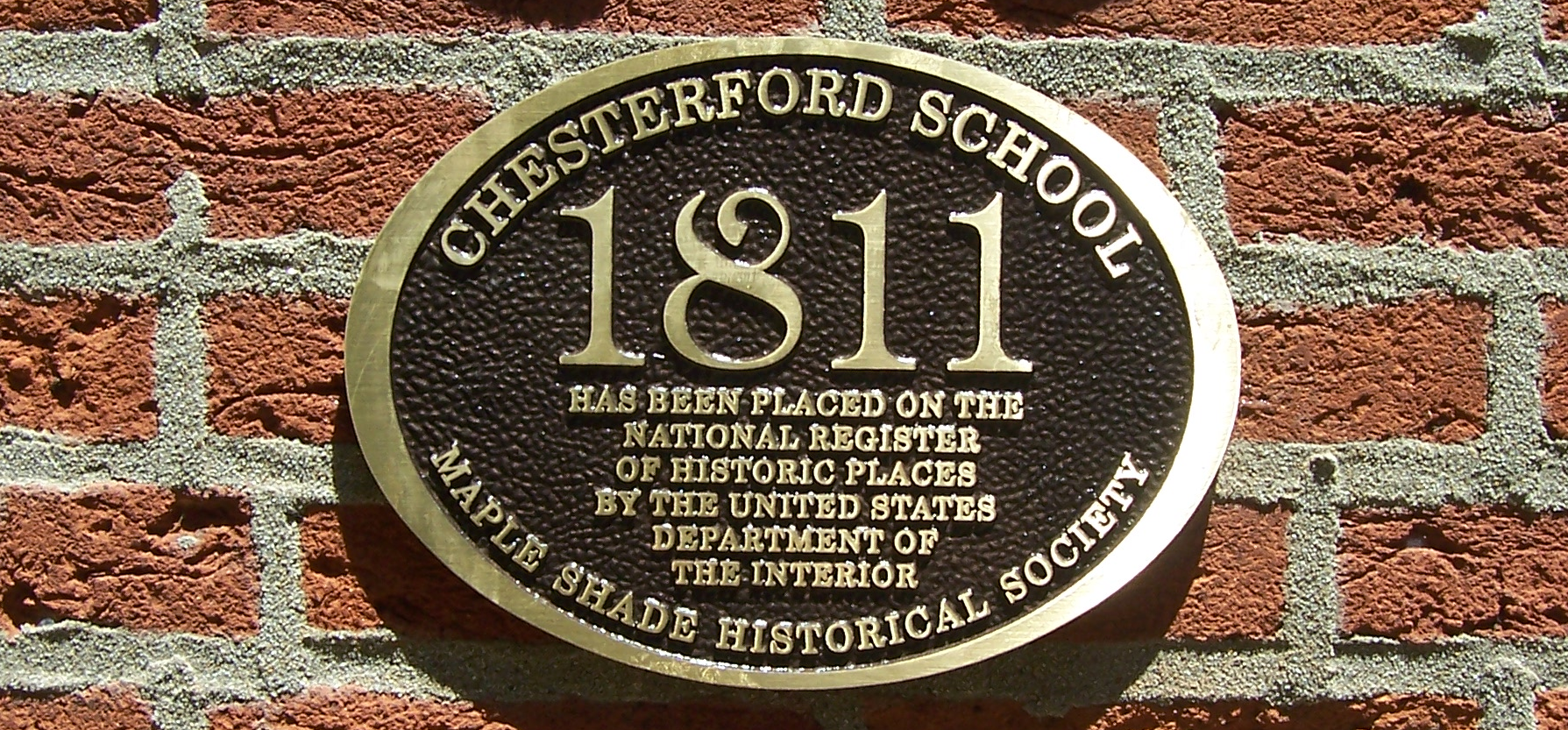
- Chesterfield School The Little Red Schoolhouse in Maple Shade, NJ was the Chesterford School.

- Seal
- Motto(s): "Nice Town, Friendly People"
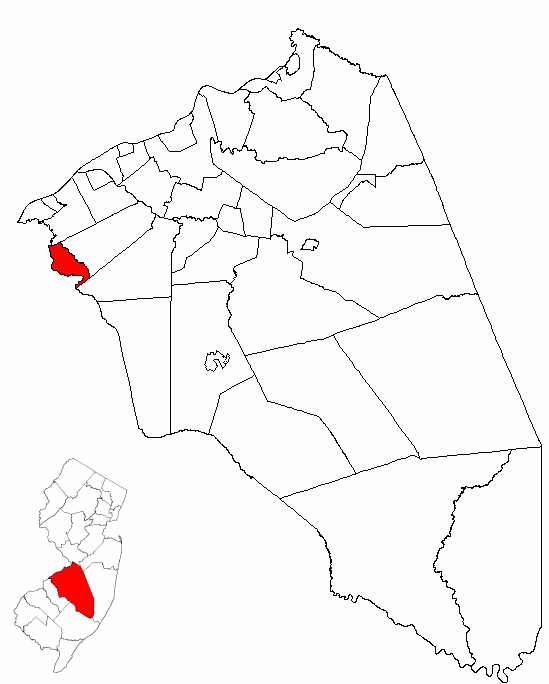
- Maple Shade highlighted in Burlington County. Inset: Burlington County highlighted in the State of New Jersey.

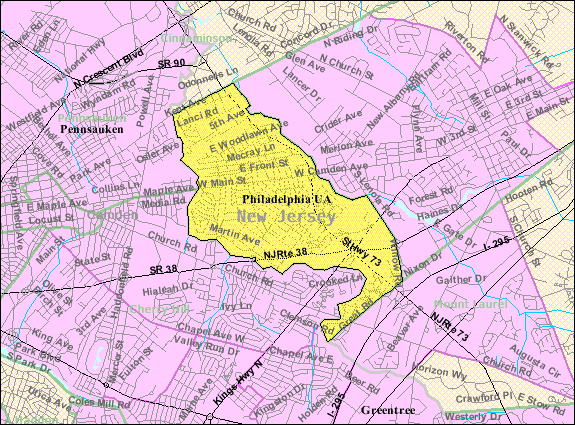
- Census Bureau map of Maple Shade Township, New Jersey

- Location in Burlington County Location in New Jersey Location in the United States
- Coordinates: 39.952381°N 74.994896°W
- Country: United States
- State: New Jersey
- County: Burlington
- Established: November 6, 1688 as Chester Township
- Incorporated: February 21, 1798
- Renamed: November 6, 1945 as Maple Shade Township

Government
  - Type: Faulkner Act (council–manager)
  - Body: Township Council
  - Mayor: Charles Kauffman (D, term ends December 31, 2023)
  - Administrator: Susan E. Danson
  - Municipal clerk: Andrea T. McVeigh

Area
  - Total: 3.83 sq mi (9.92 km^{2})
  - Land: 3.83 sq mi (9.91 km^{2})
  - Rank: 303rd of 565 in state 27th of 40 in county
- Elevation: 46 ft (14 m)

Population (2020)
  - Total: 19,980
  - Estimate (2023): 20,088
  - Rank: 139th of 565 in state 8th of 40 in county
  - Density: 5,220.8/sq mi (2,015.8/km^{2})
  - Rank: 108th of 565 in state 2nd of 40 in county
- Time zone: UTC−05:00 (Eastern (EST))
  - Summer (DST): UTC−04:00 (Eastern (EDT))
- ZIP Code: 08052
- Area code: 856
- FIPS code: 3400543740
- GNIS feature ID: 0882094
- Website: www.mapleshade.com

Maple Shade Township is a township in Burlington County, in the U.S. state of New Jersey. As of the 2020 United States census, the township's population was 19,980, an increase of 849 (+4.4%) from the 2010 census count of 19,131, which in turn reflected an increase of 0.3% from the 19,079 counted in the 2000 census. The township, and all of Burlington County, is a part of the Philadelphia metropolitan area.

== History ==
What is now Maple Shade was originally formed as Chester Township on November 6, 1688, and was known as Cropwell Township from June 5, 1690, through February 22, 1699. Chester was incorporated as one of New Jersey's initial 104 townships by an act of the New Jersey Legislature on February 21, 1798. Portions of the township were taken to form Cinnaminson Township (March 15, 1860) and Moorestown Township (March 11, 1922). The municipality's name was changed to Maple Shade Township as of November 6, 1945, based on the results of a referendum passed that same day.

The Mary's Cafe sit-in was an informal sit-in style protest which occurred on the evening of June 11, 1950, at Mary's Cafe, a tavern in Maple Shade Township that had a reputation of being unwelcoming of Black patrons. After being refused service, Martin Luther King Jr. and three friends staged a sit-in that is believed to be the first use of the non-violence and civil disobedience tactics which would distinguish Dr. King's civil-rights activism and legacy.

== Geography ==
According to the United States Census Bureau, the township had a total area of 3.83 square miles (9.92 km^{2}), including 3.83 square miles (9.91 km^{2}) of land and <0.01 square miles (<0.01 km^{2}) of water (0.03%).

The township borders Cinnaminson Township, Moorestown Township and Mount Laurel Township in Burlington County; and Cherry Hill and Pennsauken Township in Camden County.

=== Climate ===
The climate in this area is characterized by hot, humid summers and generally mild to cool winters. According to the Köppen Climate Classification system, Maple Shade Township has a humid subtropical climate, abbreviated "Cfa" on climate maps, with the coldest months of January and February averaging about 33 °F (0.6 °C), and with an annual average temperature of 54 °F (12 °C).

== Demographics ==
Historical population
| Census | Pop. | Note | %± |
|---|---|---|---|
| 1800 | 1,464 | | — |
| 1810 | 1,839 | | 25.6% |
| 1820 | 2,253 | | 22.5% |
| 1830 | 2,333 | | 3.6% |
| 1840 | 2,603 | | 11.6% |
| 1850 | 3,601 | | 38.3% |
| 1860 | 2,227 | * | −38.2% |
| 1870 | 2,586 | | 16.1% |
| 1880 | 2,855 | | 10.4% |
| 1890 | 3,768 | | 32.0% |
| 1900 | 4,420 | | 17.3% |
| 1910 | 5,069 | | 14.7% |
| 1920 | 7,273 | | 43.5% |
| 1930 | 5,117 | * | −29.6% |
| 1940 | 5,535 | | 8.2% |
| 1950 | 6,560 | | 18.5% |
| 1960 | 12,947 | | 97.4% |
| 1970 | 16,464 | | 27.2% |
| 1980 | 20,525 | | 24.7% |
| 1990 | 19,211 | | −6.4% |
| 2000 | 19,079 | | −0.7% |
| 2010 | 19,131 | | 0.3% |
| 2020 | 19,980 | | 4.4% |
| 2023 (est.) | 20,088 | | 0.5% |
Population sources: 1800–2000; 1800–1920 1840 1850–1870; 1850 1870 1880–1890; 1890–1910 1910–1930; 1940–2000 2000; 2010 2020 * = Lost territory in previous decade.

=== 2010 census ===
The 2010 United States census counted 19,131 people, 8,525 households, and 4,655 families in the township. The population density was 5,006.1 per square mile (1,932.9/km^{2}). There were 9,186 housing units at an average density of 2,403.7 per square mile (928.1/km^{2}). The racial makeup was 78.62% (15,040) White, 9.54% (1,826) Black or African American, 0.16% (31) Native American, 5.65% (1,080) Asian, 0.03% (5) Pacific Islander, 3.14% (601) from other races, and 2.86% (548) from two or more races. Hispanic or Latino of any race were 8.32% (1,591) of the population.

Of the 8,525 households, 22.8% had children under the age of 18; 37.9% were married couples living together; 11.8% had a female householder with no husband present and 45.4% were non-families. Of all households, 36.5% were made up of individuals and 10.4% had someone living alone who was 65 years of age or older. The average household size was 2.21 and the average family size was 2.94.

18.4% of the population were under the age of 18, 9.8% from 18 to 24, 31.9% from 25 to 44, 26.6% from 45 to 64, and 13.2% who were 65 years of age or older. The median age was 37.6 years. For every 100 females, the population had 94.6 males. For every 100 females ages 18 and older there were 93.2 males.

The Census Bureau's 2015–2019 American Community Survey showed that (in 2019 inflation-adjusted dollars) median household income was $61,335 (with a margin of error of +/− $3,606) and the median family income was $825854 (+/− $7,763). Males had a median income of $58,963 (+/− $4,320) versus $49,215 (+/− $2.945) for females. The per capita income for the borough was $34,774 (+/− $2,053). About 8.1% of families and 9.1% of the population were below the poverty line, including 13.2% of those under age 18 and 4.6% of those age 65 or over.

=== 2000 census ===
As of the 2000 United States census there were 19,079 people, 8,462 households, and 4,721 families residing in the township. The population density was 4,959.4 inhabitants per square mile (1,914.8/km^{2}). There were 9,009 housing units at an average density of 2,341.8 per square mile (904.2/km^{2}). The racial makeup of the township was 83.17% White, 7.21% African American, 0.16% Native American, 6.10% Asian, 0.04% Pacific Islander, 1.69% from other races, and 1.62% from two or more races. Hispanic or Latino of any race were 4.46% of the population.

There were 8,462 households, out of which 23.8% had children under the age of 18 living with them, 41.4% were married couples living together, 9.9% had a female householder with no husband present, and 44.2% were non-families. 36.0% of all households were made up of individuals, and 11.2% had someone living alone who was 65 years of age or older. The average household size was 2.22 and the average family size was 2.95.

In the township the population was spread out, with 19.4% under the age of 18, 8.6% from 18 to 24, 36.0% from 25 to 44, 20.7% from 45 to 64, and 15.4% who were 65 years of age or older. The median age was 36 years. For every 100 females, there were 95.9 males. For every 100 females age 18 and over, there were 93.6 males.

The median income for a household in the township was $45,426, and the median income for a family was $53,912. Males had a median income of $40,290 versus $30,858 for females. The per capita income for the township was $23,812. About 3.8% of families and 5.4% of the population were below the poverty line, including 3.8% of those under age 18 and 7.6% of those age 65 or over.

== Government ==
=== Local government ===
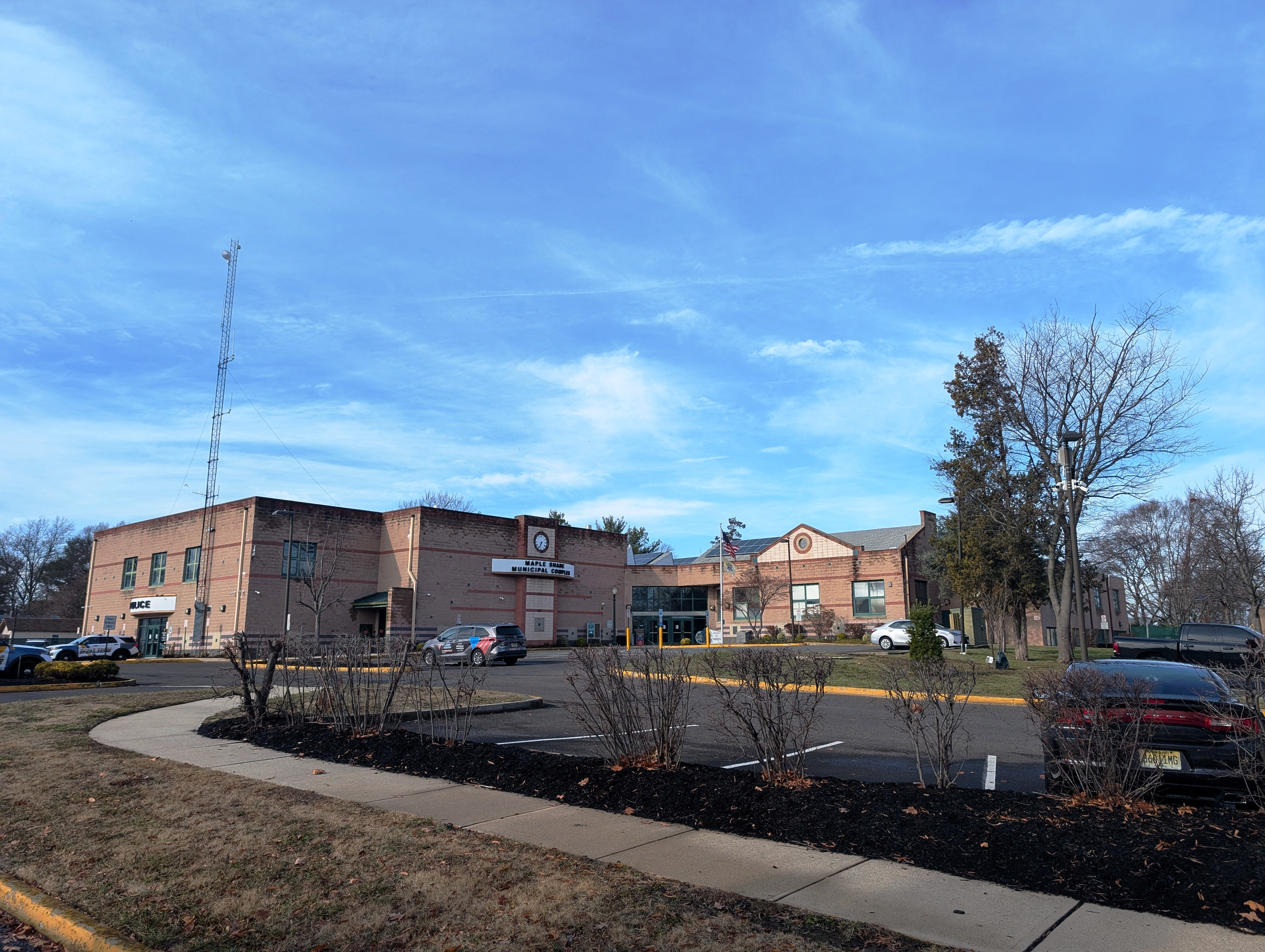
Maple Shade Municipal Complex

Maple Shade Township operates within the Faulkner Act (formally known as the Optional Municipal Charter Law) under the Council-Manager (Plan E) form of municipal government, implemented based on the recommendations of a Charter Study Commission as of January 1, 1975. The township is one of 42 (of the 564) municipalities statewide that use this form of government. The governing body is composed of a five-member Township Council, whose members are elected at-large in partisan elections to serve four-year terms of office on a staggered basis, with either two or three seats up for election in even-numbered years as part of the November general election. At a reorganization meeting held during the first week of January after each election, the Council selects one of its members to serve as Mayor and another as Deputy Mayor.

As of 2023, members of the Maple Shade Township Council are Mayor Charles Kauffman (D, term on committee ends December 31, 2026; term as mayor ends 2023), Deputy Mayor Steve Schmidt (D, term on committee ends 2024; term as deputy mayor ends 2023), Sandra Nunes (D, 2026), Claire B. Volpe (D, 2024) and J. Nelson Wiest (D, 2024).

=== Federal, state and county representation ===
Maple Shade Township is located in the 1st Congressional District and is part of New Jersey's 6th state legislative district.

For the 119th United States Congress, New Jersey's 1st congressional district is represented by Donald Norcross (D, Camden). New Jersey is represented in the United States Senate by Democrats Cory Booker (Newark, term ends 2027) and Andy Kim (Moorestown, term ends 2031).

For the 2026–2027 session, the 6th legislative district of the New Jersey Legislature is represented in the State Senate by James Beach (D, Voorhees Township) and in the General Assembly by Louis Greenwald (D, Voorhees Township) and Melinda Kane (D, Cherry Hill).

Burlington County is governed by a Board of County Commissioners comprised of five members who are chosen at-large in partisan elections to serve three-year terms of office on a staggered basis, with either one or two seats coming up for election each year; at an annual reorganization meeting, the board selects a director and deputy director from among its members to serve a one-year term. As of 2026, Burlington County's Commissioners are: Director Felicia Hopson (D, Willingboro Township, term as commissioner ends December 31, 2027; term as director ends 2026), Deputy Director Allison Eckel (D, Medford, term as commissioner ends 2028; term as deputy director ends 2026), Randy Brolo (D, Lumberton, 2026; elected to an unexpired term), Tyler Burrell (D, Delran Township, 2027) and Tom Pullion (D, Edgewater Park, 2026).

Burlington County's constitutional officers are Clerk Joanne Schwartz (D, Southampton Township, 2028), Sheriff James H. Kostoplis (D, Bordentown, 2028) and Surrogate Brian J. Carlin (D, Burlington Township, 2026).

=== Politics ===
United States presidential election results for Maple Shade Township 2024 2020 2016 2012 2008 2004
| Year | Republican | | Democratic | | Third party(ies) | |
| Year | No. | % | No. | % | No. | % |
|---|---|---|---|---|---|---|
| 2024 | 3,538 | 42.18% | 4,734 | 56.44% | 116 | 1.38% |
| 2020 | 3,680 | 39.83% | 5,438 | 58.86% | 121 | 1.31% |
| 2016 | 3,123 | 40.11% | 4,354 | 55.91% | 310 | 3.98% |
| 2012 | 2,546 | 33.32% | 5,003 | 65.48% | 92 | 1.20% |
| 2008 | 2,844 | 36.15% | 4,904 | 62.33% | 120 | 1.53% |
| 2004 | 3,060 | 39.41% | 4,628 | 59.61% | 76 | 0.98% |

As of March 2011, there were a total of 10,638 registered voters in Maple Shade Township, of which 4,172 (39.2% vs. 33.3% countywide) were registered as Democrats, 1,593 (15.0% vs. 23.9%) were registered as Republicans and 4,863 (45.7% vs. 42.8%) were registered as Unaffiliated. There were 10 voters registered as Libertarians or Greens. Among the township's 2010 Census population, 55.6% (vs. 61.7% in Burlington County) were registered to vote, including 68.2% of those ages 18 and over (vs. 80.3% countywide).

Gubernatorial election results for Maple Shade Township
| Year | Republican | | Democratic | | Third party(ies) | |
| Year | No. | % | No. | % | No. | % |
|---|---|---|---|---|---|---|
| 2025 | 2,414 | 38.09% | 3,888 | 61.34% | 36 | 0.57% |
| 2021 | 2,154 | 46.65% | 2,435 | 52.74% | 28 | 0.61% |
| 2017 | 1,410 | 36.98% | 2,336 | 61.26% | 67 | 1.76% |
| 2013 | 2,333 | 61.31% | 1,419 | 37.29% | 53 | 1.39% |
| 2009 | 1,904 | 44.80% | 2,059 | 48.45% | 287 | 6.75% |
| 2005 | 1,572 | 36.75% | 2,463 | 57.59% | 242 | 5.66% |

In the 2012 presidential election, Democrat Barack Obama received 5,003 votes here (65.1% vs. 58.1% countywide), ahead of Republican Mitt Romney with 2,546 votes (33.2% vs. 40.2%) and other candidates with 92 votes (1.2% vs. 1.0%), among the 7,680 ballots cast by the township's 11,433 registered voters, for a turnout of 67.2% (vs. 74.5% in Burlington County). In the 2008 presidential election, Democrat Barack Obama received 4,904 votes here (61.7% vs. 58.4% countywide), ahead of Republican John McCain with 2,844 votes (35.8% vs. 39.9%) and other candidates with 120 votes (1.5% vs. 1.0%), among the 7,942 ballots cast by the township's 10,653 registered voters, for a turnout of 74.6% (vs. 80.0% in Burlington County). In the 2004 presidential election, Democrat John Kerry received 4,628 votes here (59.0% vs. 52.9% countywide), ahead of Republican George W. Bush with 3,060 votes (39.0% vs. 46.0%) and other candidates with 76 votes (1.0% vs. 0.8%), among the 7,848 ballots cast by the township's 10,658 registered voters, for a turnout of 73.6% (vs. 78.8% in the whole county).

In the 2013 gubernatorial election, Republican Chris Christie received 2,333 votes here (60.5% vs. 61.4% countywide), ahead of Democrat Barbara Buono with 1,419 votes (36.8% vs. 35.8%) and other candidates with 53 votes (1.4% vs. 1.2%), among the 3,857 ballots cast by the township's 11,283 registered voters, yielding a 34.2% turnout (vs. 44.5% in the county). In the 2009 gubernatorial election, Democrat Jon Corzine received 2,059 ballots cast (48.2% vs. 44.5% countywide), ahead of Republican Chris Christie with 1,904 votes (44.5% vs. 47.7%), Independent Chris Daggett with 230 votes (5.4% vs. 4.8%) and other candidates with 57 votes (1.3% vs. 1.2%), among the 4,275 ballots cast by the township's 10,780 registered voters, yielding a 39.7% turnout (vs. 44.9% in the county).

United States Senate election results for Maple Shade Township1
| Year | Republican | | Democratic | | Third party(ies) | |
| Year | No. | % | No. | % | No. | % |
|---|---|---|---|---|---|---|
| 2024 | 2,934 | 37.29% | 4,762 | 60.52% | 172 | 2.19% |
| 2018 | 2,507 | 41.73% | 3,155 | 52.51% | 346 | 5.76% |
| 2012 | 2,263 | 31.77% | 4,788 | 67.21% | 73 | 1.02% |
| 2006 | 1,635 | 38.38% | 2,507 | 58.85% | 118 | 2.77% |

United States Senate election results for Maple Shade Township2
| Year | Republican | | Democratic | | Third party(ies) | |
| Year | No. | % | No. | % | No. | % |
|---|---|---|---|---|---|---|
| 2020 | 3,405 | 38.04% | 5,428 | 60.65% | 117 | 1.31% |
| 2014 | 1,361 | 39.36% | 2,045 | 59.14% | 52 | 1.50% |
| 2013 | 891 | 40.83% | 1,253 | 57.42% | 38 | 1.74% |
| 2008 | 2,407 | 34.19% | 4,467 | 63.44% | 167 | 2.37% |

== Education ==
The Maple Shade School District serves public school students in pre-kindergarten through twelfth grade. As of the 2021–22 school year, the district, comprised of four schools, had an enrollment of 2,370 students and 219.0 classroom teachers (on an FTE basis), for a student–teacher ratio of 10.8:1. Schools in the district (with 2021–22 enrollment data from the National Center for Education Statistics) are Howard R. Yocum Elementary School with 565 students in grades PreK to 1 Maude M. Wilkins Elementary School with 534 students in grades 2-4 Ralph J. Steinhauer Elementary School with 342 students in grades 5-6 and Maple Shade High School with 888 students in grades 7-12.

Students from Maple Shade Township, and from all of Burlington County, are eligible to attend the Burlington County Institute of Technology, a countywide public school district that serves the vocational and technical education needs of students at the high school and post-secondary level at its campuses in Medford and Westampton Township.

== Transportation ==
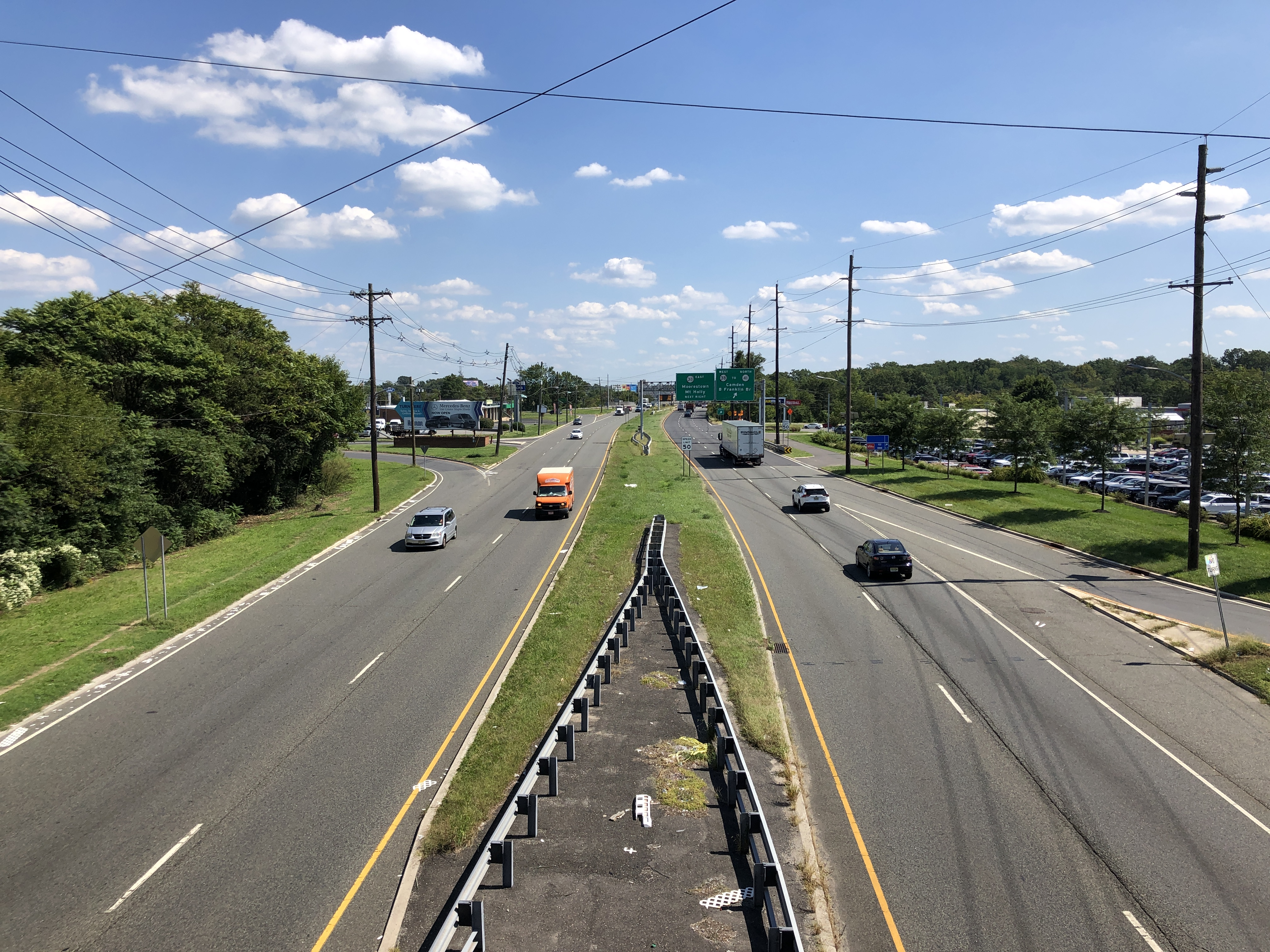
Route 73 southbound in Maple Shade

=== Roads and highways ===
As of May 2010, the township had a total of 51.98 miles (83.65 km) of roadways, of which 42.65 miles (68.64 km) were maintained by the municipality, 3.38 miles (5.44 km) by Burlington County and 5.95 miles (9.58 km) by the New Jersey Department of Transportation.

Passing through the township are Route 38, Route 41 and Route 73. The New Jersey Turnpike and Interstate 295 are both accessible just outside the township by way of Route 73.

=== Public transportation ===
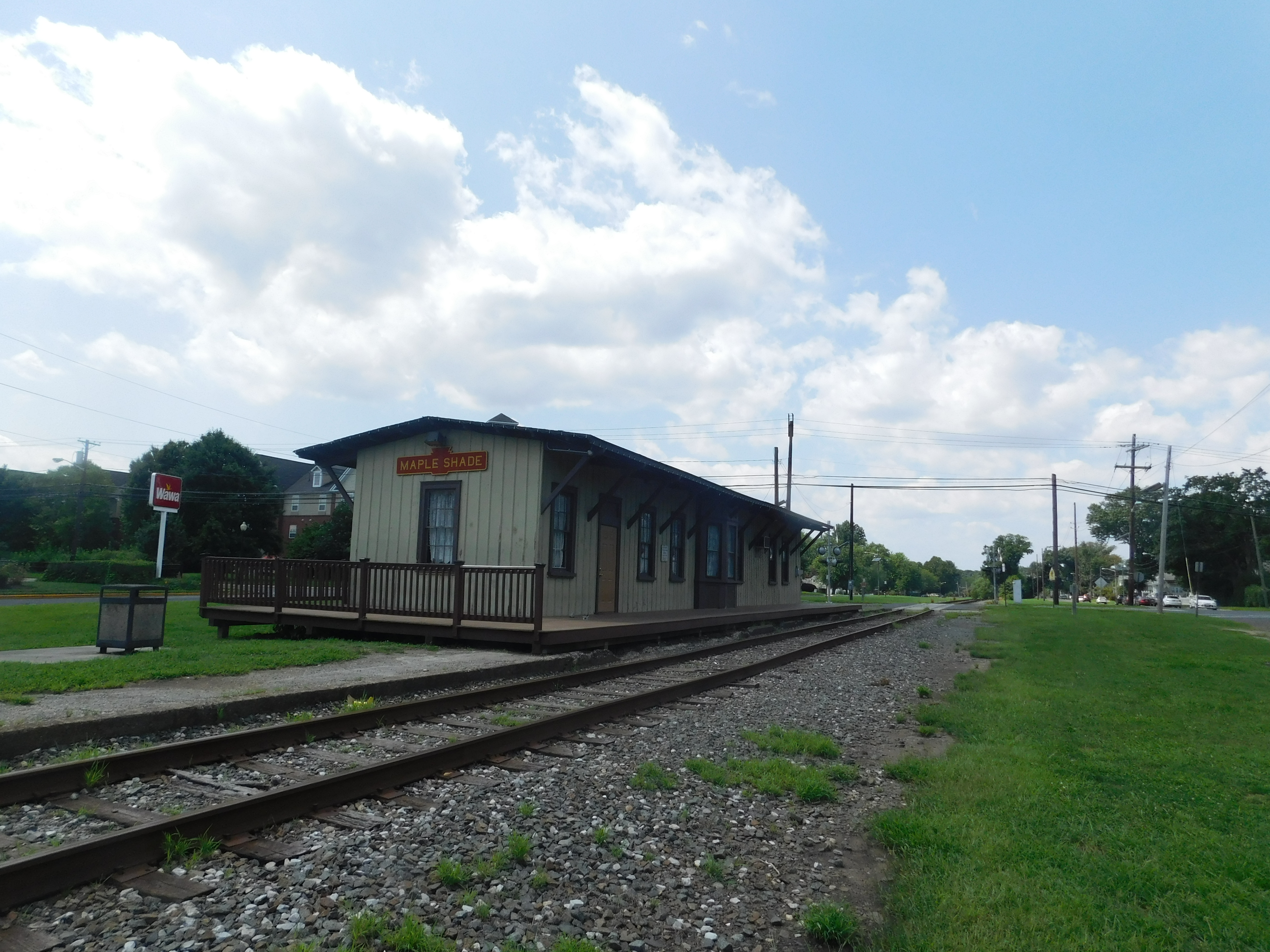
The former Pennsylvania Railroad station in Maple Shade

NJ Transit provides bus service to and from Philadelphia on route 317 (from Asbury Park), and 407 (from Moorestown Mall) to Camden, and on the 413 route between Camden, and Burlington.

== Notable people ==
People who were born in, residents of, or otherwise closely associated with Maple Shade Township include:

- George H. Barbour (1917–1992), lawyer and politician who served in the New Jersey General Assembly for one term in the 1960s and two terms in the 1970s, where he represented the 7th Legislative District
- Paul Baloche (born 1962), Christian music artist, worship leader and singer-songwriter
- Randy Cain (1945–2009), Philadelphia soul singer with The Delfonics
- Billy Darnell (1926–2007), professional wrestler and major star of the 1940s and 1950s who won championships in the National Wrestling Alliance and World Wide Wrestling Federation
- John G. Morris (1916–2017), picture editor, author and journalist, and an important figure in the history of photojournalism
- Suzanne Muldowney (born 1952), performance artist best known for her appearances on The Howard Stern Show to discuss and perform her dance interpretation of the cartoon character Underdog
- Daniel Nester (born 1968), writer, editor and poet
- John Tartaglia (born 1978), puppeteer, actor, singer, dancer, voice artist and comedian
- George E. Williams, politician who served in the New Jersey General Assembly from the 7th Legislative District from 1994 to 1996.
