= Vocational-technical school =

Type of school in the United States and Canada

A vocational-technical school, often called a vo-tech school, is a high school in the United States and Canada designed to bring vocational and technical training to its students. Proponents claim that students bound for college may be able to use such skills to realize a distinct educational advantage over other students in their major.

Additionally, vocational-technical schools often provide training to adults from the surrounding communities. The training, offered for a cost, may range from a single course to an entire program of ten or more courses.

Vocational-technical schools are licensed, registered, or accredited like any other high school.

== Types ==
Though less common, some vocational-technical schools are full-time. Not only do they provide vocational and technical training, but they also provide traditional academics that students would typically receive during high school, all within one school district or building. Such schools often expose students to their academic classes during one half of the day, and to their vocational and technical classes during the other half, or have academic weeks and vocational-technical weeks.

Most vocational-technical schools, however, are part-time. This means that they only provide vocational and technical training, while the academic portion of their education is obtained from their home school district. Students engaged in such schools often spend one half of the school year at their home school for academic classes and the other half of the school year at the vocational-technical school for training, alternatively they may go to their home school in the morning and their vocational-technical school after lunch.

== Vocational and technical programs ==
Programs that are common to vocational-technical schools include:

- Agricultural: animal science, floriculture, food science, horticulture, landscaping
- Business: accounting and finance, advertising, business administrative services, commerce, hospitality management, marketing, office management, retail management
- Computing: computer networking, computer programming, computer repair, information technology, Computer Science
- Construction: building maintenance, cabinet making, carpentry, electrical construction, HVAC, masonry, plumbing, woodworking, construction technology
- Creative: commercial art, fashion design, graphic arts, mass media, new media arts
- Culinary: culinary arts, food preparation, pastry arts
- Healthcare: allied health professions, cosmetology, medical sciences, nursing
- Human services: childcare, criminal justice, early childhood education, emergency services, fire protection
- Mechanical: automotive collision repair, automotive technology, diesel technology, machining, welding
- Technical: aviation, computer-aided design, electronics technology, engineering, logistics
