= Fieldsboro, New Jersey =

Borough in Burlington County, New Jersey, US

- Borough
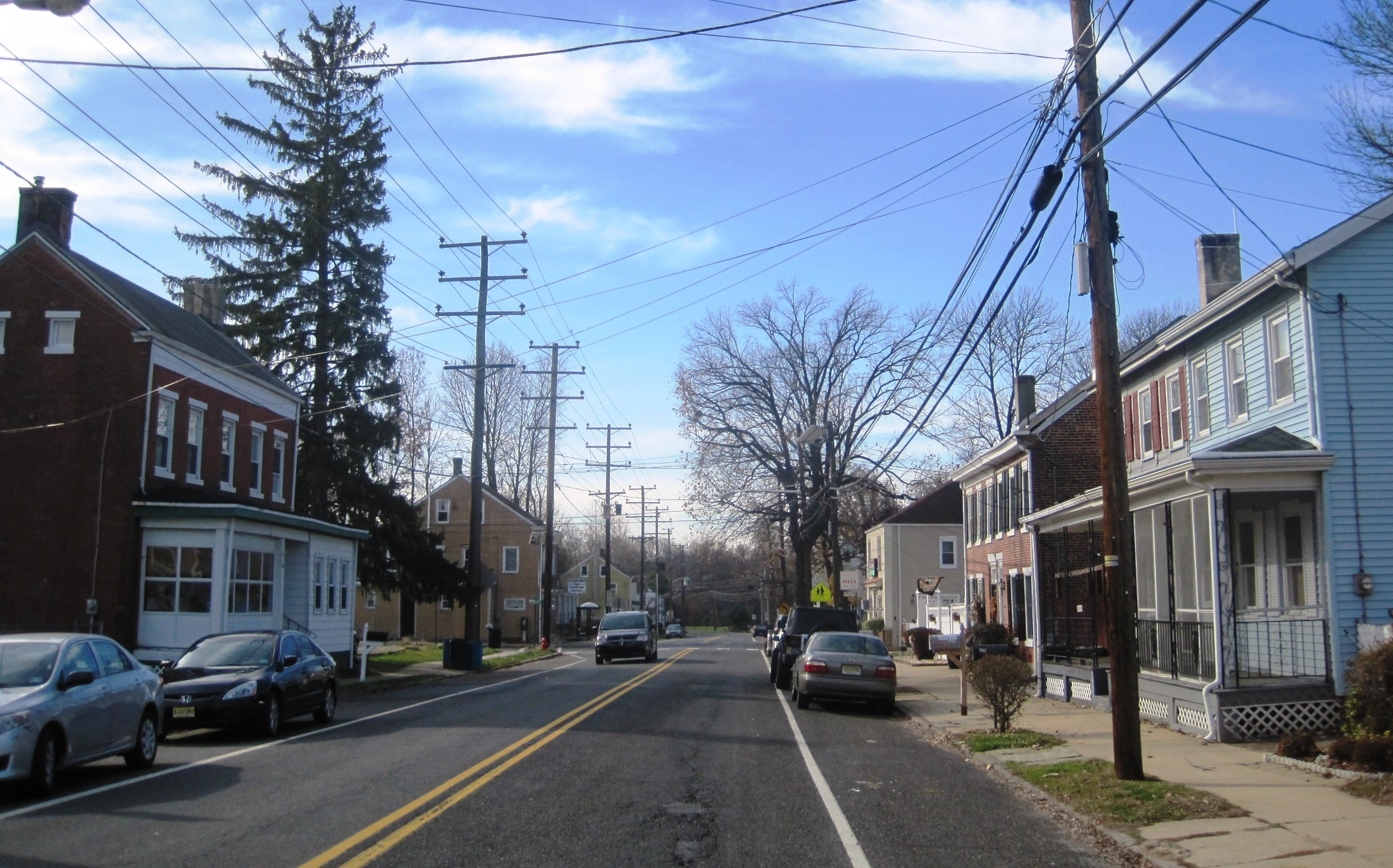
- Downtown Fieldsboro

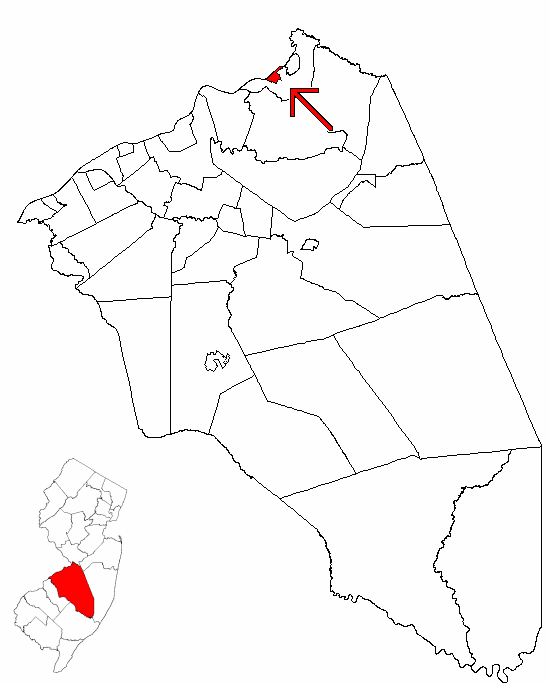
- Location of Fieldsboro in Burlington County highlighted in red (right). Inset map: Location of Burlington County in New Jersey highlighted in red (left).

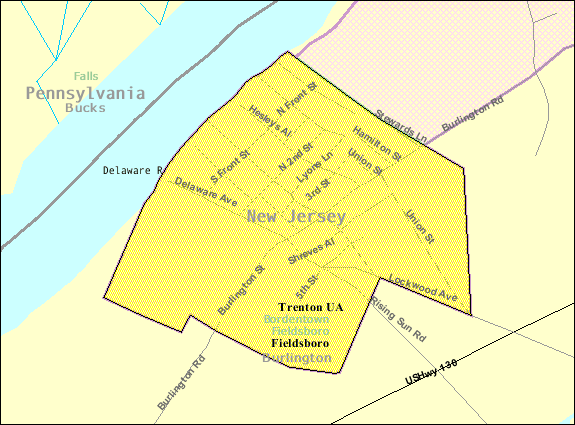
- Census Bureau map of Fieldsboro, New Jersey

- Location in Burlington County Location in New Jersey Location in the United States
- Coordinates: 40.135471°N 74.733355°W
- Country: United States
- State: New Jersey
- County: Burlington
- Incorporated: March 7, 1850
- Named for: Field family

Government
  - Type: Borough
  - Body: Borough Council
  - Mayor: David R. Hansell (D, term ends December 31, 2025)
  - Municipal clerk: Patrice Hansell

Area
  - Total: 0.36 sq mi (0.93 km^{2})
  - Land: 0.28 sq mi (0.72 km^{2})
  - Water: 0.081 sq mi (0.21 km^{2}) 22.22%
  - Rank: 552nd of 565 in state 40th of 40 in county
- Elevation: 59 ft (18 m)

Population (2020)
  - Total: 526
  - Estimate (2023): 538
  - Rank: 551st of 565 in state 40th of 40 in county
  - Density: 1,886.9/sq mi (728.5/km^{2})
  - Rank: 302nd of 565 in state 17th of 40 in county
- Time zone: UTC−05:00 (Eastern (EST))
  - Summer (DST): UTC−04:00 (Eastern (EDT))
- ZIP Code: 08505 – Bordentown, New Jersey
- Area code: 609 exchanges: 291, 298, 324, 424
- FIPS code: 3400523250
- GNIS feature ID: 0885219
- Website: www.fieldsboro.us

Fieldsboro is a borough in Burlington County, in the U.S. state of New Jersey. As of the 2020 United States census, the borough's population was 526, a decrease of 14 (−2.6%) from the 2010 census count of 540, which in turn reflected an increase of 18 (+3.4%) from the 522 counted in the 2000 census. The borough, and all of Burlington County, is a part of the Philadelphia metropolitan area.

Fieldsboro was incorporated as a borough by an act of the New Jersey Legislature as Fieldsborough on March 7, 1850, within portions of Mansfield Township. It separated from Bordentown Township as an independent municipality c. 1894. The borough was named for the Field family, prominent early settlers in the area.

== Geography ==
According to the United States Census Bureau, the borough had a total area of 0.36 square miles (0.93 km^{2}), including 0.28 square miles (0.72 km^{2}) of land and 0.08 square miles (0.21 km^{2}) of water (22.22%).

The borough borders Bordentown Township and the Delaware River.

== Demographics ==
Historical population
| Census | Pop. | Note | %± |
|---|---|---|---|
| 1900 | 459 | | — |
| 1910 | 480 | | 4.6% |
| 1920 | 530 | | 10.4% |
| 1930 | 493 | | −7.0% |
| 1940 | 537 | | 8.9% |
| 1950 | 589 | | 9.7% |
| 1960 | 583 | | −1.0% |
| 1970 | 615 | | 5.5% |
| 1980 | 597 | | −2.9% |
| 1990 | 579 | | −3.0% |
| 2000 | 522 | | −9.8% |
| 2010 | 540 | | 3.4% |
| 2020 | 526 | | −2.6% |
| 2023 (est.) | 538 | ▲ | 2.3% |
Population sources: 1900–2000 1900–1920; 1900–1910 1850–1930; 1940–2000 2000; 2010 2020

=== 2010 census ===
The 2010 United States census counted 540 people, 206 households, and 141 families in the borough. The population density was 2,007.7 per square mile (775.2/km^{2}). There were 221 housing units at an average density of 821.7 per square mile (317.3/km^{2}). The racial makeup was 81.11% (438) White, 12.59% (68) Black or African American, 0.00% (0) Native American, 2.04% (11) Asian, 0.00% (0) Pacific Islander, 0.37% (2) from other races, and 3.89% (21) from two or more races. Hispanic or Latino of any race were 2.78% (15) of the population.

Of the 206 households, 35.9% had children under the age of 18; 44.2% were married couples living together; 17.0% had a female householder with no husband present and 31.6% were non-families. Of all households, 23.8% were made up of individuals and 7.8% had someone living alone who was 65 years of age or older. The average household size was 2.62 and the average family size was 3.13.

25.0% of the population were under the age of 18, 7.0% from 18 to 24, 28.5% from 25 to 44, 28.9% from 45 to 64, and 10.6% who were 65 years of age or older. The median age was 37.1 years. For every 100 females, the population had 92.9 males. For every 100 females ages 18 and older there were 91.9 males.

The Census Bureau's 2006–2010 American Community Survey showed that (in 2010 inflation-adjusted dollars) median household income was $60,938 (with a margin of error of +/− $19,968) and the median family income was $67,500 (+/− $22,306). Males had a median income of $68,750 (+/− $47,669) versus $48,500 (+/− $14,355) for females. The per capita income for the borough was $30,284 (+/− $8,796). About none of families and 1.0% of the population were below the poverty line, including 2.1% of those under age 18 and none of those age 65 or over.

=== 2000 census ===
As of the 2000 United States census there were 522 people, 189 households, and 138 families residing in the borough. The population density was 1,921.0 inhabitants per square mile (741.7/km^{2}). There were 204 housing units at an average density of 750.7 per square mile (289.8/km^{2}). The racial makeup of the borough was 81.61% White, 15.90% African American, 0.19% Native American, 0.38% from other races, and 1.92% from two or more races. Hispanic or Latino of any race were 2.49% of the population.

There were 189 households, out of which 34.9% had children under the age of 18 living with them, 51.3% were married couples living together, 16.9% had a female householder with no husband present, and 26.5% were non-families. 17.5% of all households were made up of individuals, and 5.8% had someone living alone who was 65 years of age or older. The average household size was 2.76 and the average family size was 3.17.

In the borough the population was spread out, with 25.3% under the age of 18, 6.7% from 18 to 24, 38.3% from 25 to 44, 17.2% from 45 to 64, and 12.5% who were 65 years of age or older. The median age was 35 years. For every 100 females, there were 88.4 males. For every 100 females age 18 and over, there were 94.0 males.

The median income for a household in the borough was $58,958, and the median income for a family was $66,607. Males had a median income of $41,932 versus $35,625 for females. The per capita income for the borough was $23,908. About 2.1% of families and 1.9% of the population were below the poverty line, including 0.7% of those under age 18 and none of those age 65 or over.

== Government ==
=== Local government ===
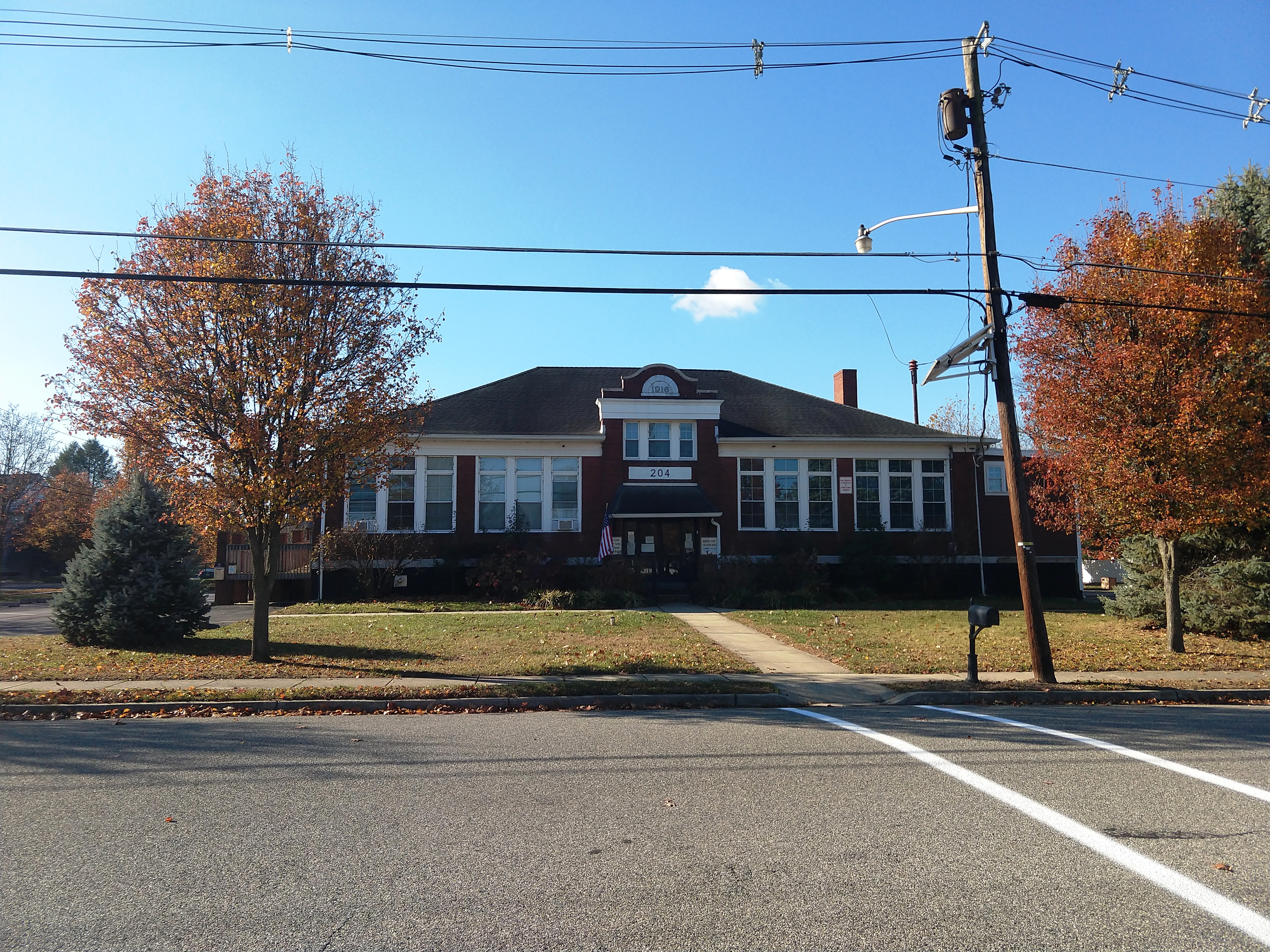
Fieldsboro Borough Hall

Fieldsboro is governed under the borough form of New Jersey municipal government, which is used in 218 (of the 564) municipalities statewide, making it the most common form of government in New Jersey. The governing body is comprised of a mayor and a borough council, with all positions elected at-large on a partisan basis as part of the November general election. A mayor is elected directly by the voters to a four-year term of office. The borough council includes six members elected to serve three-year terms on a staggered basis, with two seats coming up for election each year in a three-year cycle. The borough form of government used by Fieldsboro is a "weak mayor / strong council" government in which council members act as the legislative body with the mayor presiding at meetings and voting only in the event of a tie. The mayor can veto ordinances subject to an override by a two-thirds majority vote of the council. The mayor makes committee and liaison assignments for council members, and most appointments are made by the mayor with the advice and consent of the council.

As of 2026, the mayor of Fieldsboro is Republican Timothy Tyler, whose term of office ends December 31, 2029. Members of the Borough Council are Amy Telford (D, 2026, elected Council President in January 2026), Mike Carroll (D, 2026), Hanna Charles (D, 2028), Gregg Cummings (R, 2027), John Errigo (D, 2027), Amy Telford (D, 2026), and Roe Weaver (D, 2028).

In 2015, the borough disbanded its police force and reached an agreement with Bordentown City to provide police coverage in the borough as a shared service at a cost of $28,000 per year, less than half the cost to Fieldsboro for its three-man force.

In February 2012, the council selected Jonathan Norcross to fill the vacancy on the borough council that had been created when David Hansell became mayor. Hansell had been appointed as mayor to fill the vacancy of Buddy Tyler following his death in November 2011.

=== Federal, state and county representation ===
Fieldsboro is located in the 3rd Congressional District and is part of New Jersey's 7th state legislative district. Prior to the 2011 reapportionment following the 2010 census, Fieldsboro had been in the 30th state legislative district. Prior to the 2010 Census, Fieldsboro had been part of the 4th Congressional District, a change made by the New Jersey Redistricting Commission that took effect in January 2013, based on the results of the November 2012 general elections.

For the 119th United States Congress, New Jersey's 3rd congressional district is currently represented Herb Conaway (D, Delran Township). New Jersey is represented in the United States Senate by Democrats Cory Booker (Newark, term ends 2027) and Andy Kim (Moorestown, term ends 2031).

For the 2026–2027 session, the 7th legislative district of the New Jersey Legislature is represented in the State Senate by Troy Singleton (D, Palmyra) and in the General Assembly by Carol A. Murphy (D, Mount Laurel) and Balvir Singh (D, Burlington Township).

Burlington County is governed by a Board of County Commissioners comprised of five members who are chosen at-large in partisan elections to serve three-year terms of office on a staggered basis, with either one or two seats coming up for election each year; at an annual reorganization meeting, the board selects a director and deputy director from among its members to serve a one-year term. As of 2026, Burlington County's Commissioners are: Director Felicia Hopson (D, Willingboro Township, term as commissioner ends December 31, 2027; term as director ends 2026), Deputy Director Allison Eckel (D, Medford, term as commissioner ends 2028; term as deputy director ends 2026), Randy Brolo (D, Lumberton, 2026; elected to an unexpired term), Tyler Burrell (D, Delran Township, 2027) and Tom Pullion (D, Edgewater Park, 2026).

Burlington County's constitutional officers are Clerk Joanne Schwartz (D, Southampton Township, 2028), Sheriff James H. Kostoplis (D, Bordentown, 2028) and Surrogate Brian J. Carlin (D, Burlington Township, 2026).

=== Politics ===
United States presidential election results for Fieldsboro 2024 2020 2016 2012 2008 2004
| Year | Republican | | Democratic | | Third party(ies) | |
| Year | No. | % | No. | % | No. | % |
|---|---|---|---|---|---|---|
| 2024 | 138 | 45.54% | 161 | 53.14% | 4 | 1.32% |
| 2020 | 131 | 40.94% | 182 | 56.88% | 7 | 2.19% |
| 2016 | 121 | 44.16% | 131 | 47.81% | 22 | 8.03% |
| 2012 | 79 | 30.27% | 175 | 67.05% | 7 | 2.68% |
| 2008 | 90 | 30.00% | 200 | 66.67% | 10 | 3.33% |
| 2004 | 108 | 40.75% | 153 | 57.74% | 4 | 1.51% |

As of March 2011, there were a total of 350 registered voters in Fieldsboro, of which 183 (52.3% vs. 33.3% countywide) were registered as Democrats, 49 (14.0% vs. 23.9%) were registered as Republicans and 118 (33.7% vs. 42.8%) were registered as Unaffiliated. There were no voters registered to other parties. Among the borough's 2010 Census population, 64.8% (vs. 61.7% in Burlington County) were registered to vote, including 86.4% of those ages 18 and over (vs. 80.3% countywide).

In the 2012 presidential election, Democrat Barack Obama received 175 votes (66.5% vs. 58.1% countywide), ahead of Republican Mitt Romney with 79 votes (30.0% vs. 40.2%) and other candidates with 7 votes (2.7% vs. 1.0%), among the 263 ballots cast by the borough's 359 registered voters, for a turnout of 73.3% (vs. 74.5% in Burlington County). In the 2008 presidential election, Democrat Barack Obama received 200 votes (66.0% vs. 58.4% countywide), ahead of Republican John McCain with 90 votes (29.7% vs. 39.9%) and other candidates with 10 votes (3.3% vs. 1.0%), among the 303 ballots cast by the borough's 376 registered voters, for a turnout of 80.6% (vs. 80.0% in Burlington County). In the 2004 presidential election, Democrat John Kerry received 153 votes (57.5% vs. 52.9% countywide), ahead of Republican George W. Bush with 108 votes (40.6% vs. 46.0%) and other candidates with 4 votes (1.5% vs. 0.8%), among the 266 ballots cast by the borough's 362 registered voters, for a turnout of 73.5% (vs. 78.8% in the whole county).

Gubernatorial election results for Fieldsboro
| Year | Republican | | Democratic | | Third party(ies) | |
| Year | No. | % | No. | % | No. | % |
|---|---|---|---|---|---|---|
| 2025 | 117 | 41.20% | 164 | 57.75% | 3 | 1.06% |
| 2021 | 100 | 48.31% | 105 | 50.72% | 2 | 0.97% |
| 2017 | 62 | 35.23% | 107 | 60.80% | 7 | 3.98% |
| 2013 | 90 | 52.02% | 77 | 44.51% | 6 | 3.47% |
| 2009 | 81 | 36.16% | 124 | 55.36% | 19 | 8.48% |
| 2005 | 61 | 35.67% | 101 | 59.06% | 9 | 5.26% |

In the 2013 gubernatorial election, Republican Chris Christie received 90 votes (50.8% vs. 61.4% countywide), ahead of Democrat Barbara Buono with 77 votes (43.5% vs. 35.8%) and other candidates with 6 votes (3.4% vs. 1.2%), among the 177 ballots cast by the borough's 360 registered voters, yielding a 49.2% turnout (vs. 44.5% in the county). In the 2009 gubernatorial election, Democrat Jon Corzine received 124 ballots cast (52.3% vs. 44.5% countywide), ahead of Republican Chris Christie with 81 votes (34.2% vs. 47.7%), Independent Chris Daggett with 11 votes (4.6% vs. 4.8%) and other candidates with 8 votes (3.4% vs. 1.2%), among the 237 ballots cast by the borough's 363 registered voters, yielding a 65.3% turnout (vs. 44.9% in the county).

United States Senate election results for Fieldsboro1
| Year | Republican | | Democratic | | Third party(ies) | |
| Year | No. | % | No. | % | No. | % |
|---|---|---|---|---|---|---|
| 2024 | 109 | 37.46% | 174 | 59.79% | 8 | 2.75% |
| 2018 | 106 | 43.62% | 111 | 45.68% | 26 | 10.70% |
| 2012 | 71 | 29.34% | 167 | 69.01% | 4 | 1.65% |
| 2006 | 53 | 33.97% | 96 | 61.54% | 7 | 4.49% |

United States Senate election results for Fieldsboro2
| Year | Republican | | Democratic | | Third party(ies) | |
| Year | No. | % | No. | % | No. | % |
|---|---|---|---|---|---|---|
| 2020 | 119 | 40.34% | 170 | 57.63% | 6 | 2.03% |
| 2014 | 54 | 36.00% | 89 | 59.33% | 7 | 4.67% |
| 2013 | 35 | 39.33% | 54 | 60.67% | 0 | 0.00% |
| 2008 | 90 | 34.88% | 158 | 61.24% | 10 | 3.88% |

== Education ==
Students in public school for kindergarten through twelfth grade attend the schools of the Bordentown Regional School District, which also serves students from Bordentown City and Bordentown Township. As of the 2023–24 school year, the district, comprised of five schools, had an enrollment of 2,232 students and 190.0 classroom teachers (on an FTE basis), for a student–teacher ratio of 11.8:1. Schools in the district (with 2023–24 enrollment data from the National Center for Education Statistics) are Clara Barton Elementary School with 215 students in grades K–2 (generally serves Bordentown City and the Holloway Meadows section of Bordentown Township), Peter Muschal Elementary School with 480 students in grades PreK–5 (generally serves remainder of Bordentown Township and the Borough of Fieldsboro), MacFarland Intermediate School with 247 students in grades 3–5, Bordentown Regional Middle School with 505 students in grades 6–8 and Bordentown Regional High School with 762 students in grades 9–12. The district's board of education is comprised of nine members, who are elected directly by voters to serve three-year terms of office on a staggered basis, with three seats up for election each year. The board's nine seats are allocated based on the population of the constituent municipalities, with one seat assigned to Fieldsboro.

The New Hanover Township School District, consisting of New Hanover Township (including its Cookstown area) and Wrightstown Borough, sends students to Bordentown Regional High School on a tuition basis for grades 9–12 as part of a sending/receiving relationship that has been in place since the 1960s, with about 50 students from the New Hanover district being sent to the high school. As of 2011, the New Hanover district was considering expansion of its relationship to send students to Bordentown for middle school for grades 6–8.

Students from Fieldsboro, and from all of Burlington County, are eligible to attend the Burlington County Institute of Technology, a countywide public school district that serves the vocational and technical education needs of students at the high school and post-secondary level at its campuses in Medford and Westampton.

== Transportation ==
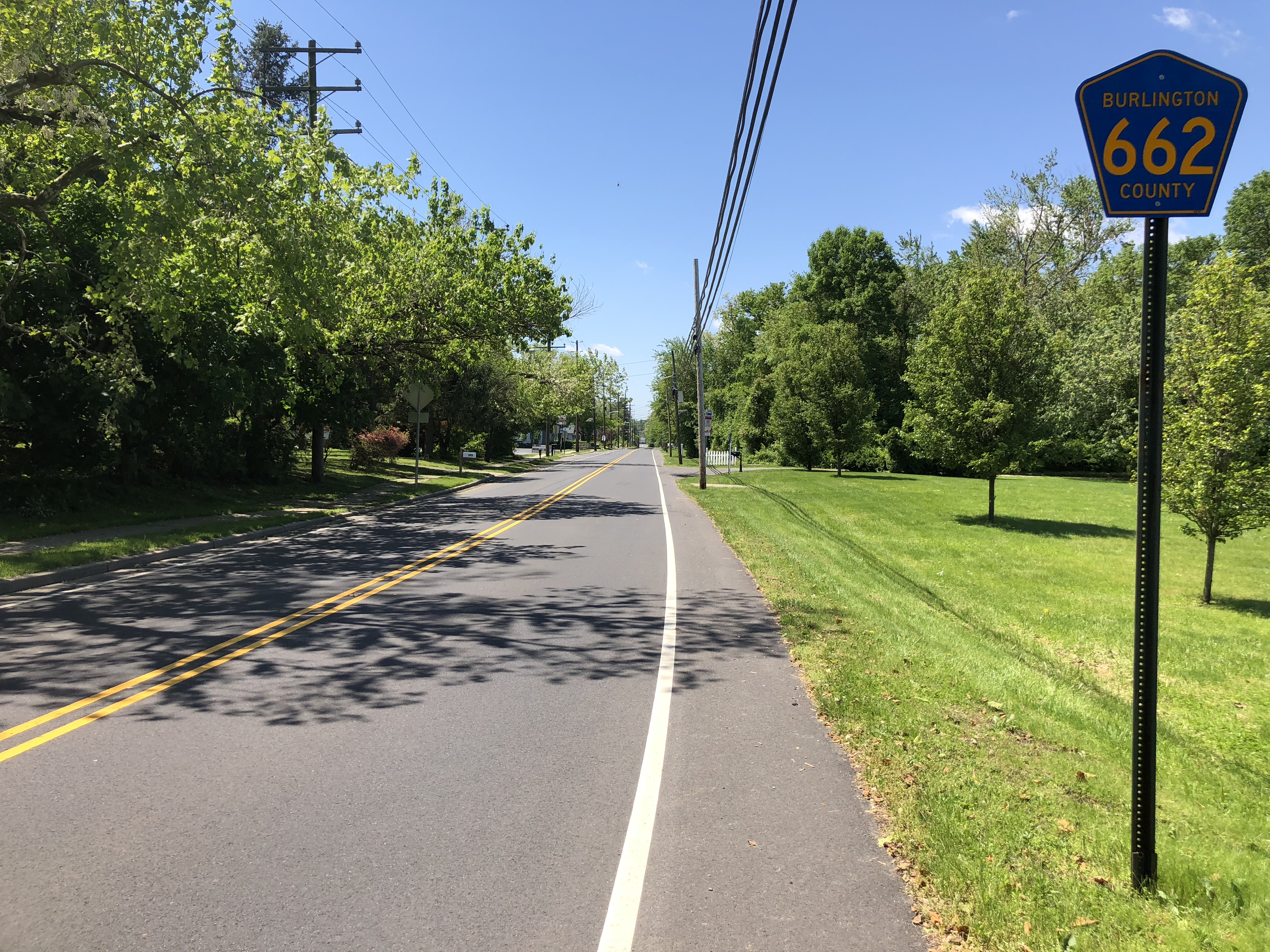
County Route 662 in Fieldsboro

=== Roads and highways ===
As of May 2010, the borough had a total of 3.31 miles (5.33 km) of roadways, of which 2.67 miles (4.30 km) were maintained by the municipality and 0.64 miles (1.03 km) by Burlington County.

County Route 662 is the main road through Fieldsboro. No major county, state, U.S. or interstate passes through the borough. U.S. Route 130 is the closest major road to the borough. Other roads that are accessible in neighboring Bordentown Township are Interstate 295, U.S. Route 206 and the New Jersey Turnpike (Interstate 95).

=== Public transportation ===
NJ Transit provides bus service in the borough between Trenton and Philadelphia on the 409 route.

== Notable people ==
People who were born in, residents of, or otherwise closely associated with Bordentown include:

- Len Boone, singer, songwriter and multi-instrumentalist
- Archibald Crossley (1896–1985), pollster, statistician and pioneer in public opinion research
- August Zeller (1863–1918), sculptor and teacher
