= Barbara Kalik =

American politician (born 1936)

Barbara F. (Kalik) Bennett

Member of the New Jersey General Assembly from the 7th district
- In office January 10, 1978 – January 14, 1992 Serving with Herman T. Costello, Catherine A. Costa, Thomas P. Foy and Jack Casey
- Preceded by: Charles B. Yates
- Succeeded by: Priscilla B. Anderson; José F. Sosa

Personal details
- Born: November 8, 1936 (age 89) The Bronx, New York City, New York
- Party: Democratic

Barbara Faith (Kalik) Bennett (born November 8, 1936) is an American Democratic Party politician who served in the New Jersey General Assembly from the 7th Legislative District from 1978 to 1992.

She was born in The Bronx in 1936 and attended William Howard Taft High School and the City College of New York. Kalik worked as a travel agent owning an agency in Willingboro and served on various local and county Democratic committees. She also served on the Willingboro Township council from 1965 through 1977 and was chosen as the township's mayor in 1974 and 1977.

First elected to the Assembly in 1977, she served a total of seven terms there. In 1991, Kalik and her running mate, newly appointed Assemblyman Jack Casey were defeated by Republicans Priscilla B. Anderson and José F. Sosa.

== Accomplishments while in office ==
Kalik is responsible for helping to secure funding for South Jersey Human Services, Transportation and Higher Education; the first garnishee for areas of child support legislation in the country; the elimination of tenure for superintendents in NJ; the workers compensation legislation for fireman on duty; and the basic banking bills.

Kalik was the first woman elected to Council in Willingboro, the first female Mayor in Willingboro, the first female President of the Burlington County Chamber of Commerce, the first female elected to the Legislature from Burlington County, first female to speak at the municipal manager’s session at the league of municipalities, first female to serve as chair of the Assembly Appropriations Committee, first chair of the South Jersey Legislative coalition, and first woman to serve as Deputy Speaker.

Kalik is also proud to have removed the NJ Sales Tax from necessity items; secure $31 million in Federal and State funds to replace the hazardous Bridgeboro Bridge; instrumental in creating New Jersey Institute of Technology-Burlington County College, University of Medicine and Dentistry New Jersey and the Cooper Hospital-Coriell Institute for Cancer Research; allowed for direct deposit of state employees paychecks and for the Treasurer to wire funds; eliminated unconscionable delays in processing of state retirement checks; enabled more seniors to qualify for PAAD; pursued an investigation of public utility rates and costs; obtained funding for Spousal Abuse programs and Family Planning and day care centers; and eased restrictions on NJ wineries in the retail sale of their wines.

Kalik also made sure all workers, fire and emergency personnel, and citizens have the Right to Know about Hazardous and Toxic substances in their workplaces and communities, setting a precedent across the country.
