= Bradford S. Smith =

American politician

Chair of the New Jersey Casino Control Commission
- In office 1994–1998
- Preceded by: Steven P. Perskie
- Succeeded by: James R. Hurley

Member of the New Jersey Senate from the 7th district
- In office January 14, 1992 – January 11, 1994
- Preceded by: Thomas P. Foy
- Succeeded by: Jack Casey

Member of the Burlington County Board of Chosen Freeholders
- In office 1985–1992

Mayor of Cinnaminson Township
- In office 1979–1982

Member of Cinnaminson Township Council
- In office 1977–1985

Personal details
- Born: November 3, 1950 (age 75) Riverside Township, New Jersey, U.S.
- Party: Republican
- Parent(s): Walter L. Smith Jr. Alice H. Smith

Bradford S. Smith (born November 3, 1950) is an American Republican Party politician who served in the New Jersey Senate from the 7th Legislative District from 1992 to 1994 before serving for four years as the fourth chairman of the New Jersey Casino Control Commission. He was the Mayor of Cinnaminson Township, New Jersey in 1979 and 1982.

== Biography ==
A resident of Cinnaminson Township, Smith served from 1977 to 1985 on the township committee and then served until 1992 on the Burlington County Board of Chosen Freeholders.

Smith's father Walter also served in the New Jersey Legislature.
