= Senator Yates =

Senator Yates may refer to:

- Abraham Yates Jr. (1724–1796), New York State Senate
- Charles B. Yates (1939–2000), New Jersey State Senate
- David Yates (politician) (born 1980), Kentucky State Senate
- Richard Yates (politician, born 1815) (1815–1873), Illinois State Senate
