= Catherine A. Costa =

American politician (1926–2025)

Member of the New Jersey Senate from the 7th district
- In office January 10, 1984 – November 19, 1990
- Preceded by: Herman T. Costello
- Succeeded by: Thomas P. Foy

Member of the New Jersey General Assembly from the 7th district
- In office January 12, 1982 – January 10, 1984 Serving with Barbara Kalik
- Preceded by: Herman T. Costello
- Succeeded by: Thomas P. Foy

Member of the Burlington County Board of Chosen Freeholders
- In office 1970–1982
- Preceded by: Anthony Greski

Personal details
- Born: March 21, 1926 Brooklyn, New York City, U.S.
- Died: June 27, 2025 (aged 99)
- Party: Democratic

Catherine Aurora Costa (née Bravo; March 21, 1926 – June 27, 2025) was an American politician who represented New Jersey's 7th legislative district in the New Jersey General Assembly from 1982 to 1984 and in the New Jersey Senate from 1984 to 1990.

As legislator, she sponsored legislation eliminating no-fault auto insurance, funding municipal wastewater treatment, and expanding access to housing and the state homestead tax rebate.

== Early life ==
Catherine Aurora Bravo was born on March 21, 1926, in Brooklyn.

== Political career ==
Later a resident of Mount Holly, Costa was one of the first residents of Levittown, before it was renamed as Willingboro Township, New Jersey. She served on the Willingboro Township Library Board of Trustees in 1959 and from 1962 to 1966. She chaired the township's Zoning Board from 1969 to 1973. In 1964, she was elected chair of the Willingboro Democratic organization.

Costa became involved in politics after working on John F. Kennedy's presidential campaign in 1960. She was present in October when Kennedy campaigned in Willingboro.

=== Burlington County Freeholder ===
In 1970, Costa ran for Burlington County freeholder. She was opposed by the Burlington County Democratic Party organization, which supported county clerk Charles Ehrlich and Vincent Rogliano, who had withdrawn from a campaign for Congress in order to clear the field for Charles B. Yates. Although she ran off the line, she ran with incumbent U.S. senator Harrison A. Williams, since the Burlington organization had given the line to his challenger, Frank J. Guarini. She lost the primary by a large margin, running third in every municipality except New Hanover, which she narrowly won. However, Costa quickly had another opportunity to run when Richard Nixon appointed freeholder Anthony Greski as U.S. Marshal for the District of New Jersey. In the special election to complete Greski's term, Costa lost to Republican Frank Lockhart by eighteen votes out of more than 70,000 cast after a recount.

In 1971, Costa defeated Lockhart in a recount by about four thousand votes. In 1974, she was re-elected over former freeholder James A. Miller in a landslide following the Watergate scandal.

In 1976, Costa was the Democratic nominee for New Jersey's 6th congressional district, which included parts of Camden, Burlington and Ocean counties. Although Jimmy Carter nearly carried the district against incumbent Gerald Ford, Costa was defeated by incumbent Edwin B. Forsythe in a landslide. She received only forty percent of the vote.

In 1977, Charles B. Yates left his Assembly seat in order to run successfully for New Jersey Senate. Costa considered campaigning for his seat, but Willingboro mayor Barbara Kalik quickly consolidated support. Costa opted to run for re-election and won another landslide over Mount Laurel councilman Michael Traino. She was re-elected to a fourth term over Florence councilman Emmett Spurlock in 1980, carrying 35 out of 40 municipalities in the county.

== New Jersey Legislature ==
Costa represented the 7th district in the New Jersey legislature as assemblywoman from 1982 to 1984 and senator from 1984 to 1990, when she resigned to accept an appointment as chair of the New Jersey Alcohol and Beverage Commission.

As a legislator, she sponsored legislation to eliminate no-fault automobile insurance, provide zero-interest loans to municipal governments to fund wastewater treatment facilities, and to allow school boards to use vacant buildings for emergency housing. She also sponsored safe harbor legislation for applicants who missed the filing deadline for homestead rebates and to provide equal benefits for men who are widowers of veterans.

=== New Jersey General Assembly (1982–84) ===
In 1981, Yates announced that he would not run for re-election to the Senate. Both Kalik and Costa sought his seat, along with Herman T. Costello, assemblyman and mayor of Burlington. Party leaders supported Costello for the seat, with Kalik and Costa nominated for the Assembly. In the 1981 general election, Costa led the ticket by 1,628 votes over Kalik.

=== New Jersey Senate (1984–90) ===
In 1983, Costello opted not to run for a second term; Costa and Kalik each solicited party support to succeed him. In an effort to pre-empt an intraparty fight, Democratic insiders attempted to recruit Costa to challenge U.S. representative Chris Smith, but she declined. Costa gained the key support of Burlington County party chair Ronald Bookbinder, and just before the filing deadline, Kalik withdrew from consideration after failing to accumulate necessary rank-and-file support to take on Bookbinder and Costa. She was easily elected over freeholder Henry Metzger in 1983 and re-elected over Cinnaminson mayor James Bristow in 1987.

In 1990, she resigned from the Senate to accept an appointment as chair of the state alcohol commission from Governor James Florio. Her resignation allowed her to dodge the 1991 Republican wave in the state, in which Republicans swept the seventh district and gained supermajorities in both chambers of the legislature.

In 1993, Costa sought to return to the Senate. She ran off the line and defeated her successor, Thomas P. Foy, in the Democratic primary but withdrew from the general election after facing allegations that she had used campaign funds to lease a Cadillac, pay off personal credit card bills, and for hair salon services.

== Personal life ==
She married Joseph Costa, an electrical and nuclear engineer. The couple had three children and were married for 65 years until Joseph's death in 2011. She was recognized as New Jersey Mother of the Year in 1976.

Catherine Costa died on June 27, 2025, at the age of 99.
