= George H. Barbour =

American lawyer and politician

George H. Barbour (June 24, 1917 – September 23, 1992) was an American lawyer and politician who served in the New Jersey General Assembly for one term in the 1960s and two terms in the 1970s, where he represented the 7th Legislative District, before being appointed to serve on the New Jersey Board of Public Utilities.

== Personal life ==
Born in Black Township, Somerset County, Pennsylvania, Barbour earned his undergraduate degree at Rutgers University before earning a degree in law at Rutgers Law School-Camden. He served with the United States Army during World War II in Europe and India, attaining the rank of first lieutenant.

A resident of Maple Shade Township, he practiced law in his hometown and spent a decade as the township's municipal attorney before pursuing elected office.

Barbour died of a heart attack on September 23, 1992, at the age of 75 at Kennedy University Hospital in Cherry Hill, New Jersey. He was survived by his wife, Veronica, as well as by a daughter and four sons.

== Public service ==
Barbour represented Burlington County in the New Jersey General Assembly from 1962 to 1964, having been elected together with G. Edward Koenig. Barbour and Koening ran for re-election in 1963, losing to Republicans Robert H. Berglund and Walter L. Smith Jr.

In the November 1965 general election, Barbour ran for the New Jersey Senate seat in the 4th Legislative District, which then covered all of Burlington County, and lost to Republican Edwin B. Forsythe.

In November 1971, Barbour and Democratic running mate Charles B. Yates were elected to the New Jersey General Assembly to represent Legislative District 4C, which covered portions of Burlington County, defeating Republicans Harold L. Colburn and Wynn Kennedy.

In the November 1973 general election, Barbour and Yates were elected to represent the 7th Legislative District in the General Assembly, the first election in which the 40-district legislature was established under the terms of the 1964 U.S. Supreme Court decision in Reynolds v. Sims, which required the populations of legislative districts to be as equal as possible. The new 7th District covered much of Burlington County. Barbour and Yates defeated Republican candidates Ralph A. Skowron and William B. Hawks. Barbour and Yates were re-elected in 1975, defeating Bennett E. Bozarth and John F. Vassallo Jr. For the 1976–77 legislative session, Barbour was elected to serve as the Assembly's assistant majority leader.

After the state had painted the base of the dome of the New Jersey State House in a shade of blue, Barbour and Yates introduced legislation in 1972 that would require the dome to be restored with the traditional gold together with an off-white base; the restoration included covering the dome in gold leaf that cost the state $28,000. A bill, introduced by Barbour and signed into law by Governor Byrne in 1974, created a statewide system of scenic trails, with the Appalachian Trail the first to be designated as part of the network.

Barbour resigned from the Assembly on September 26, 1976, after being nominated by Governor Brendan Byrne to fill the seat that had been held by Anthony J. Grossi on the three-member New Jersey Board of Public Utilities. He was sworn into office as the board's third member on October 5 of that year. Herman T. Costello was elected in a November 1976 special election to fill Barbour's vacant seat and was sworn into office on November 8, 1976. Barbour served as the board's president from 1979 to 1983.

In 1980, Barbour served as an alternate delegate to the Democratic National Convention held in New York City that nominated President Jimmy Carter and Vice President Walter Mondale for reelection, having been a longtime chairman of the Burlington County Democratic Committee.
