= Jack Conners =

American Democratic Party politician

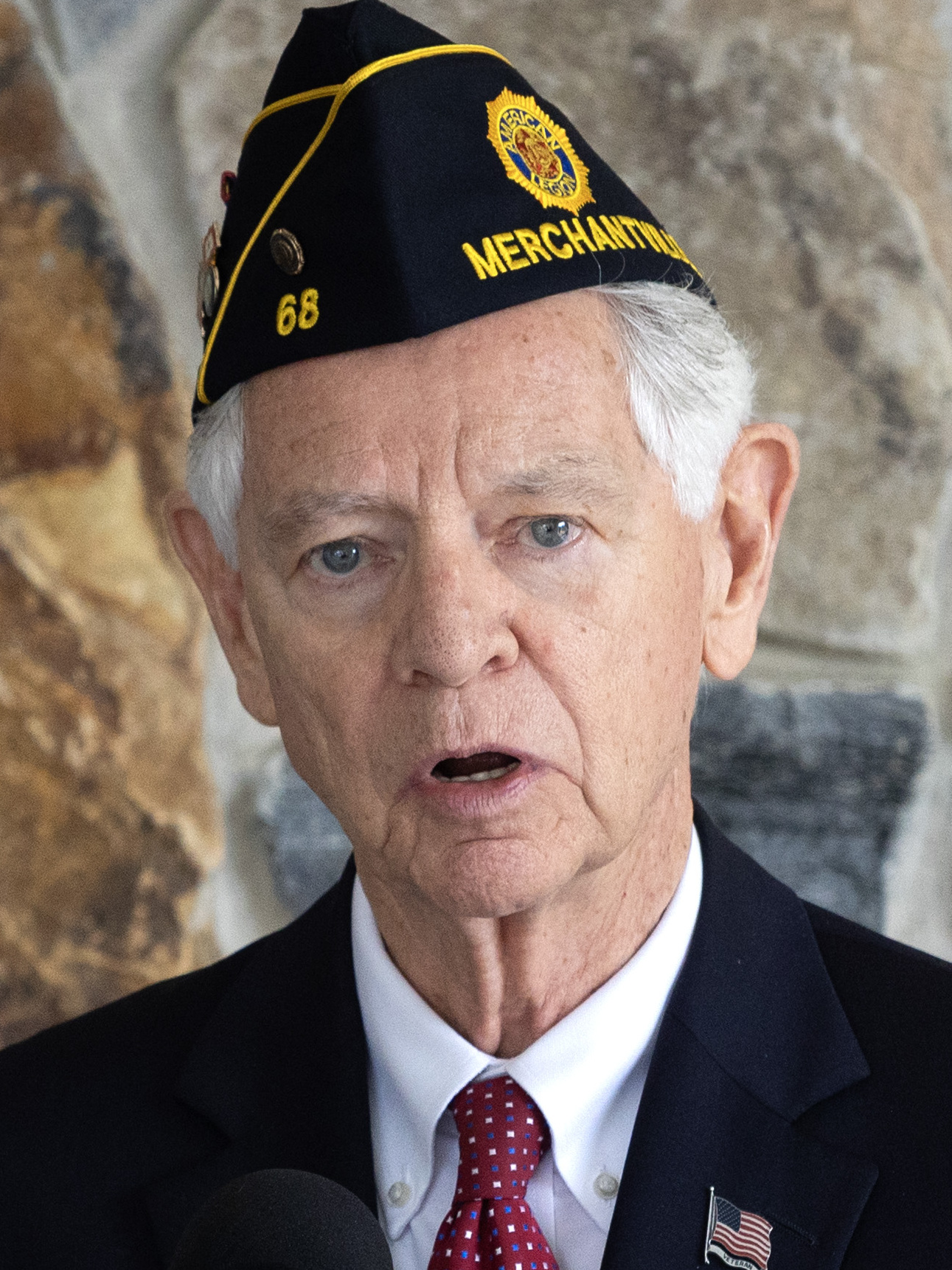
- Conners in 2025

Member of the New Jersey General Assembly from the 7th District
- In office November 23, 1998 – August 26, 2011 Serving with Herb Conaway
- Preceded by: Kenneth William Faulkner
- Succeeded by: Troy Singleton
- In office January 13, 1998 – September 17, 1998 Serving with Herb Conaway
- Preceded by: Carmine DeSopo
- Succeeded by: Kenneth William Faulkner

Personal details
- Born: July 10, 1943 (age 83)
- Party: Democratic

Jack Conners (born July 10, 1943) is an American Democratic Party politician who served in the New Jersey General Assembly, where he represented the 7th Legislative District from 1998 until his resignation in 2011.

== Career ==
In the 1997 elections, Republican Diane Allen left the Assembly and ran for and won the Senate seat, while Democrats Herb Conaway and Conners were declared the winners in that year's Assembly race, after a recount which showed that Conaway was the top vote-getter and Conners winning the second seat by a margin of 74 votes. After eight months in office following his being sworn into office in January 1998, the courts threw out the results of the 1997 election due to problems with 160 uncounted ballots from a voting machine that affected the results for the second seat. Conners was ordered to leave office in September 1998 and Republican Ken Faulkner was seated in his place. In a November 1998 special election, Conners defeated Faulkner by 5,500 votes and was sworn into office for a second time that year.

Conners served in the Assembly on the Military and Veterans' Affairs Committee (as Chair), the Financial Institutions and Insurance Committee and the State Government Committee. Conners has served on the board of the Pennsauken High School Foundation, has been a board member of the Pennsauken Free Public Library and previously served as president of the Big Brothers / Big Sisters of Camden & Gloucester Counties. Conners served in the Delaware Army National Guard from 1964 to 1969 and the United States Army Reserve from 1969 to 1970. Conners attended La Salle University and the Rutgers University Edward J. Bloustein School of Planning and Public Policy. He is a resident of Pennsauken Township.

On March 29, 2011, Conners announced that he would not seek another term to the Assembly in 2011, due to the redrawing of his district that moved his hometown of Pennsauken into a district that primarily included Camden County municipalities, while his current district had been largely based in Burlington County. He announced his resignation on August 26, 2011, effective immediately to accept a position with Camden County as its director of veterans' affairs. Conners was succeeded in the Assembly by Troy Singleton, who was selected to fill the vacant seat and defended it as an incumbent in the general election.
