= Norman Tanzman =

American politician

Member of the New Jersey Senate from the 7th Legislative District
- In office January 9, 1968 – January 8, 1974
- Preceded by: Multi-member district
- Succeeded by: Multi-member district

Member of the New Jersey General Assembly from the Middlesex district
- In office January 9, 1962 – January 9, 1968
- Preceded by: Multi-member district
- Succeeded by: Multi-member district

Personal details
- Born: July 4, 1918 New York City, New York
- Died: June 6, 2004 (aged 85) Long Branch, New Jersey
- Party: Democratic
- Spouse: Marion Schwartz

Norman Tanzman (July 4, 1918 – June 6, 2004) was an American real estate executive, philanthropist and politician. He served in the New Jersey General Assembly from 1962 to 1968 and in the New Jersey Senate from 1968 to 1974.

Tanzman moved to New Brunswick and later to nearby Highland Park, graduating from New Brunswick High School as part of the class of 1935. He was a longtime resident of Woodbridge Township, New Jersey and retired to the West End section of Long Branch, New Jersey. Tanzman was a member of Congregation Adath Israel in Woodbridge.

Tanzman established the Marion and Norman Tanzman Charitable Trust Foundation in 1996. The trust focuses on health and medical services and Jewish organizations. The trust has made significant contributions to Rutgers, including a $1 million donation to Rutgers Hillel for a kosher dining room; and $1 million for the "Hall of Jewish Learning" in support of the Jewish studies program. He was chairman of the Raritan Bay Health Foundation and raised millions of dollars for the hospital. He was a founder and benefactor of the Central New Jersey Jewish Home for the Aged. Tanzman Park in downtown Woodbridge is named after him.
