= Congregation Adath Israel (Woodbridge Township, New Jersey) =

- Location in Middlesex County, New Jersey

Religion
- Affiliation: Conservative Judaism (former)
- Ecclesiastical or organizational status: Synagogue (1913–2006)
- Status: Closed (2006)

Location
- Location: 424 Amboy Avenue, Woodbridge Township, Middlesex County, New Jersey
- Country: United States
- Interactive map of Congregation Adath Israel
- Coordinates: 40°33′19″N 74°17′10″W

Architecture
- Established: 1913 (as a congregation)
- Completed: 1949

Congregation Adath Israel is a former Conservative synagogue and religious community in Woodbridge Township, Middlesex County, New Jersey, in the United States, that held services from 1907 to 2006.

== History ==
=== Early years ===
In the second half of the 19th century, Woodbridge moved from agriculture to an industrialized base. The first Jews in Woodbridge came in the late 1880s and opened stores and "peddled the countryside." With industrialization the town increased in population, and more Jews arrived. Starting out as an association of Orthodox Jews, they first met in homes to pray. in 1907 the first High Holy Days celebration in Woodbridge was held at Kendals Hotel, near what became the Woodbridge Cloverleaf, the United States' first cloverleaf interchange. In 1913, when they had enough for a minyan, Congregation Adath Israel was incorporated. It met in various places, a hotel, farm, Masonic Hall, and a loft over a store on Main Street, until 1923 when the first synagogue was built on School Street in Woodbridge Proper. In 1939 the first Hebrew School opened, in 1945 the first rabbi, Samuel Newberger, was hired and it joined the United Synagogue of Conservative Judaism.

=== Post-World War II ===
The population of Woodbridge Township rapidly expanded after World War II. It went from 35,758 in 1950 to 78,800 in 1960 and then leveled off in the 90,000s after 1970. By the mid-1960s Woodbridge had a population of 4550 Jews, and saw three other Township Conservative synagogues, in Iselin, Colonia and Avenel. To keep up with the burgeoning Jewish population after World War II Congregation Adath Israel built a new and larger synagogue in 1949. At its peak, Adath Israel had a membership of 350 families. It was described as a "very busy vibrant congregation," and "more than a synagogue." For a time the Congregation had two names, also being known as the Adath Israel Community Center. Numerous religious and social organizations used the center, including USY, Hadassah, Men's Club, a choral group, Kadima for pre-teens, Jewish War Veterans, bingo, and an acting company, the Adath Israel Players, among many others. The acting company was called "one of the major theatrical groups in the area." Besides the synagogue and Hebrew School classes, the building housed a basketball court, multiple kitchens, and a large social hall for festivities.

=== Decline ===
Socio-economic trends beginning in the 1960s led to the eventual demise of Adath Israel. Young Jewish families had an increased economic status compared to those one or two generations earlier. Woodbridge Township remained a less affluent working class enclave; young Jewish families now chose to live in nearby areas of Middlesex County with higher mean incomes, such as Highland Park and South Edison. Also, Jews had generationally become less observant, more intermarried, less affiliated with synagogues and less likely to join the Conservative movement. With almost no young families joining, Adath Israel's once vibrant community shriveled and aged. In 1965 there were 144 Hebrew School students: by 1980 only 61. Aware of these trends, Adath Israel took advantage of the opportunity to merge with Iselin's Beth Shalom synagogue in 1980. The synagogue was still optimistic in 1987, building a $100,000 addition, noting:

Through the years there have been plenty of ups and downs in the number of people attending Adath Israel – the second largest synagogue in Central Jersey. ‘There was a big upsurge (in the number of members) five or six years ago but now it has leveled off.’ [T]he amount of residential construction in the Woodbridge area made it inevitable that more people will be attending the synagogue. [The] addition was built to meet those future needs and its present ones.

By 2005 there were only 65 members with a median age over 70. The physical plant was deteriorating, and $27,000 was needed to repair a boiler. The board came to the conclusion that a merger was a necessity, and the Neve Shalom synagogue of Metuchen was the best option. The other Conservative synagogues in Woodbridge had previously merged out of existence, and only Adath Israel was left; and it did the same. On March 16, 2006, the merger passed by a 57–28 vote, over the strong opposition of the rabbi. The meeting was attended by many adult children of members, who had grown up in the community. "Tempers and tensions ran high," and the "non-members" were told they could not further disrupt the meeting, or they would have to leave. On May 26, 2006, with no closing ceremony, six Torahs were inspected by Adath Israel's Rabbi Kula, and then driven by car to Neve Shalom; members of the two congregations walked together seven times around the synagogue carrying the torahs to signify the marriage of the shuls; the Neve Shalom rabbi gave a short speech; dinner was served. And so ended 100 years of Jewish communal life in Woodbridge.

== Notable members ==
- Steven Fulop – mayor of Jersey City
- Edward M. Hundert – sixth president of Case Western Reserve University
- Jack H. Jacobs – Medal of Honor recipient
- Norman Tanzman – philanthropist; served in the New Jersey General Assembly from 1962 to 1968 and in the New Jersey Senate from 1968 to 1974
- Alan Turtletaub – founder of The Money Store
- Marc Turtletaub – film producer and former president and CEO of The Money Store
