= Herman T. Costello =

American politician

Member of the New Jersey Senate from the 7th district
- In office January 12, 1982 – January 10, 1984
- Preceded by: Charles B. Yates
- Succeeded by: Catherine A. Costa

Member of the New Jersey General Assembly from the 7th district
- In office November 8, 1976 – January 12, 1982 Serving with Barbara Kalik
- Preceded by: George H. Barbour
- Succeeded by: Catherine A. Costa

Personal details
- Born: October 27, 1920 Burlington, New Jersey
- Died: June 11, 2017 (aged 96) Burlington, New Jersey
- Party: Democratic

Herman T. Costello (October 27, 1920 – June 11, 2017) was an American politician. Costello served as Mayor of Burlington, New Jersey. Costello also served in the New Jersey General Assembly from the 7th Legislative District from 1976 to 1982 and in the New Jersey Senate from 1982 to 1984.
