= Kenneth William Faulkner =

American politician

Kenneth William Faulkner (born 1948) is a former Republican Party politician who served for 10 weeks in the New Jersey General Assembly. After a collegiate career with the Campbell Fighting Camels basketball team, he was inducted into the Campbell University Hall of Fame. He is also a retired teacher, school administrator and high school basketball coach.

Faulkner grew up in Delanco Township, New Jersey and graduated from Riverside High School as part of the class of 1966. After playing at Campbell College (now Campbell University), he became a high school basketball coach. During his 24-year coaching career at Burlington Township High School, Faulkner led the team to a 521–129 record and three NJSIAA Group I state championships. He stepped down from his position as coach in 1996 to take a post as principal of Thomas O. Hopkins Middle School, stating that he couldn't be both a basketball coach and an effective school administrator.

== Elected office ==
Faulkner, a resident of Delanco Township, was chosen to replace Carmine DeSopo on the Republican ticket for the 7th Legislative District, together with George Williams running for the other Assembly seat and Diane Allen for Senate.

In the November 1997 general elections, Allen won the Senate seat, while Democrats Herb Conaway and Jack Conners were declared the winners in that year's Assembly race, after a recount which showed that Conaway was the top vote-getter and Conners winning the second seat by a margin of 74 votes. In September 1998, the New Jersey Superior Court threw out the results of the 1997 election due to problems with 160 uncounted ballots from a voting machine that affected the results for the second seat; Democrat Conners was ordered to leave office and Republican Faulkner was seated in his place.

The Republican committees of Burlington County and Camden County chose Faulkner to fill the vacated Assembly seat and the ballot position for the forthcoming special election; After being sworn into office on September 18, Faulkner used his first day in office to co-sponsor a bill raising awareness regarding arthritis, in addition to working to address issues related to education, healthcare and property taxes.

In a November 1998 special election held based on the court order throwing out the 1997 election results, Conners defeated Faulkner by 5,500 votes and was sworn into office on November 23 for the second time that year.
