= New Jersey's 7th legislative district =

American legislative district

- Senator: Troy Singleton (D)
- Assembly members: Carol A. Murphy (D); Balvir Singh (D)
- Registration: 43.88% Democratic; 22.14% Republican; 32.95% unaffiliated
- Demographics: 58.8% White; 22.5% Black/African American; 0.3% Native American; 6.4% Asian; 0.0% Hawaiian/Pacific Islander; 3.9% Other race; 8.2% Two or more races; 8.5% Hispanic
- Population: 230,129
- Voting-age population: 181,640
- Registered voters: 179,511

New Jersey's 7th legislative district is one of 40 in the New Jersey Legislature, covering the Burlington County municipalities of Beverly City, Bordentown City, Bordentown Township, Burlington City, Burlington Township, Cinnaminson Township, Delanco Township, Delran Township, Edgewater Park Township, Fieldsboro Borough, Florence Township, Moorestown Township, Mount Laurel Township, Palmyra Borough, Riverside Township, Riverton Borough and Willingboro Township as of the 2021 apportionment.

== Demographic characteristics ==
As of the 2020 United States census, the district had a population of 230,129, of whom 181,640 (78.9%) were of voting age. The racial makeup of the district was 135,209 (58.8%) White, 51,819 (22.5%) African American, 583 (0.3%) Native American, 14,639 (6.4%) Asian, 109 (0.0%) Pacific Islander, 8,935 (3.9%) from some other race, and 18,835 (8.2%) from two or more races. Hispanic or Latino of any race were 19,637 (8.5%) of the population.

The district had 179,511 registered voters as of December 1, 2021, of whom 58,079 (32.4%) were registered as unaffiliated, 80,714 (45.0%) were registered as Democrats, 38,637 (21.5%) were registered as Republicans, and 2,081 (1.2%) were registered to other parties.

As of the 2001 apportionment, the district includes communities in Burlington and Camden counties along the Delaware River. The district had a larger-than-average African-American community, and has low numbers of college graduates, foreign-born individuals and Hispanics. Property values per person were low and tax rates were comparatively high across the district.

== Political representation ==
For the 2026–2027 session, the 7th legislative district of the New Jersey Legislature is represented in the State Senate by Troy Singleton (D, Palmyra) and in the General Assembly by Carol A. Murphy (D, Mount Laurel) and Balvir Singh (D, Burlington Township).

The legislative district is almost entirely located within New Jersey's 3rd congressional district, except for Palmyra, which is in the 1st district.

== 1965–1973 ==
In the interim period between the 1964 Supreme Court decision Reynolds v. Sims which required the creation of state legislature districts to be made as equal in population as possible and the 1973 creation of the 40-district map, the 7th district consisted of all of Middlesex County. Two senators were elected at-large from the district in the 1965 election, and for the next two elections, three senators were elected. The Senate district was split into three districts for electing members of the Assembly for the 1967, 1969, and 1971 elections; each district elected two members to the Assembly. In addition, the 1971 also included an additional member of the Assembly sent to Trenton elected by the county at-large.

The members elected to the Senate from this district are as follows:

Session	Senators elected			
1966–1967	2	John A. Lynch Sr. (D)	J. Edward Crabiel (D)	
1968–1969	3	John A. Lynch Sr. (D)	J. Edward Crabiel (D)	Norman Tanzman (D)
1970–1971	3	John A. Lynch Sr. (D)	J. Edward Crabiel (D)	Norman Tanzman (D)
1972–1973	3	John A. Lynch Sr. (D)	J. Edward Crabiel (D)	Norman Tanzman (D)

The members elected to the Assembly from each district are as follows:

Session	District 7A	District 7B	District 7C	District 7 at-large
1968–1969	Peter P. Garibaldi (R)	Robert K. Haelig (R)	John J. Fay Jr. (D)	
1968–1969	Richard A. Olsen (R)	Frank J. Coury (R)	Robert Wilentz (D)	
1970–1971	Robert K. Haelig (R)	Donald Macrae (R)	John J. Fay Jr. (D)	
1970–1971	Peter P. Garibaldi (R)	Martin E. Kravarik (R)	Thomas J. Deverin (D)	
1972–1973	William J. Hamilton (D)	James Bornheimer (D)	John J. Fay Jr. (D)	Edwin A. Kolodziej (D)
1972–1973	Peter P. Garibaldi (R)	John H. Froude (D)	Thomas J. Deverin (D)	Edwin A. Kolodziej (D)

== District composition since 1973 ==
Upon the creation of the 40-district legislative map in 1973, the 7th district started out similar to how it looked throughout its modern history, encompassing the north-central Burlington County townships of Mount Laurel and Lumberton, wrapping around the west and north side of Mount Holly to Springfield Township and Wrightstown. For the 1981 redistricting, the district became more narrow only including municipalities along the Delaware between Pennsauken in Camden County to Burlington Township (also including Maple Shade, Willingboro, and Westampton townships). Thomas P. Foy was named in November 1990 to fill a vacancy in the Senate left by Catherine A. Costa who left office to become Director of the New Jersey Division of Alcoholic Beverage Control. In a party convention in January 1991, Jack Casey was chosen to fill the remaining portion of Foy's term in the General Assembly.

In the 1991 redistricting, the only change made to the district's boundary was the addition of Mount Holly. The district had been voting solidly Democratic until the anti-tax vote in 1991 brought in Republicans Bradford S. Smith in the Senate, who unseated Democratic incumbent Thomas P. Foy. In the Assembly race that year, Priscilla B. Anderson and José F. Sosa won the seats held by Jack Casey and Barbara Kalik. In the 1993 elections, the Republicans held on to their majorities in both houses of the legislature, but Democrats were able to retake the seats in the 7th district, with Jack Casey winning in the Senate and Steven M. Petrillo and George E. Williams in the Assembly. Williams would later switch parties in June 1995, after being denied support from local party leaders for re-nomination. In the 1995 general election, Diane Allen and Republican running mate Carmine DeSopo were elected, defeating Democratic incumbent Steven M. Petrillo and Williams's replacement on the ticket, newcomer Joseph P. Dugan. The $1.1 million spent in the 1995 Assembly race made it the first in New Jersey to cross the $1 million spending mark, as reported in the results of a study conducted by the Center for the Analysis of Public Issues of Princeton that analyzed campaign finance reports from candidates for all 80 Assembly seats.

In the 1997 elections, Republican Diane Allen ran for and won the Senate seat. Democrats Herb Conaway and Jack Conners were the winners in the 1997 Assembly race. After eight months in office, the courts threw out the results of the 1997 election due to problems with a voting machine that affected the results for the second seat. Conners was ordered to leave office in September 1998 and have his seat declared vacant. As Republicans were the last winners of the Assembly seat, the Burlington County Republican Committee was entitled to choose a person to fill the vacant seat. Republican Ken Faulkner, the highest Republican vote-getter in the 1997 election was chosen and seated until a special election could be held. In a November 1998 special election, Conners defeated Faulkner and was sworn into office for a second time that year. Conaway and Connors would both be re-elected in 1999.

In the 2001 reapportionment, Camden County's Merchantville and Burlington's Florence Township were added to the 7th district. Allen, Conaway, and Connors continued to win re-election through this decade's elections. As part of the 2011 reapportionment, municipalities that had been in the district since the 2001 apportionment were removed including Maple Shade, Merchantville, and Pennsauken (moved to the 6th district) and Mount Holly and Westampton townships (moved to the 8th district). Added to the district starting in 2011 were Fieldsboro and the city and township of Bordentown (added from the 30th district) and Moorestown and Mount Laurel (added from the 8th district). On March 29, 2011, Conners announced that due to redistricting, he would not seek another term to the Assembly in 2011. He announced his resignation on August 26, 2011, effective immediately to accept a position with Camden County as its director of veterans' affairs. Troy Singleton was selected by the Burlington and Camden County Democratic committees to fill the vacant seat in September 2011. Singleton won in the November general election and was sworn in on November 21, 2011, to finish the remainder of Conners' term, and was sworn into his first full term on January 10, 2012.

Allen declined to run for another term in 2017 due to health concerns, ending twenty years of service in the Senate. Singleton and Conaway both contemplated runs for the open Senate seat, with Singleton declaring his candidacy and Conaway later deciding to run for re-election. In November, Singleton won in a landslide, turning the Senate seat Democratic, with Conaway getting re-elected and Carol A. Murphy winning Singleton's Assembly seat. In 2024, Conaway was elected to represented New Jersey's 3rd congressional district in the United States House of Representatives, and resigned his Assembly seat upon taking office in 2025.

== Election history ==
Session	Senate	General Assembly	
1974–1975	Edward J. Hughes Jr. (D)	George H. Barbour (D)	Charles B. Yates (D)
1976–1977	Edward J. Hughes Jr. (D)	George H. Barbour (D) (Note: Resigned September 26, 1976 to become a member of the Board of Public Utilities)	Charles B. Yates (D)
1976–1977	Edward J. Hughes Jr. (D)	Herman T. Costello (D) (Note: Elected in November 1976 special election, sworn in November 8, 1976)	Charles B. Yates (D)
1978–1979	Charles B. Yates (D)	Herman T. Costello (D)	Barbara Kalik (D)
1980–1981	Charles B. Yates (D)	Herman T. Costello (D)	Barbara Kalik (D)
1982–1983	Herman T. Costello (D)	Catherine A. Costa (D)	Barbara Kalik (D)
1984–1985	Catherine A. Costa (D)	Thomas P. Foy (D)	Barbara Kalik (D)
1986–1987	Catherine A. Costa (D)	Thomas P. Foy (D)	Barbara Kalik (D)
1988–1989	Catherine A. Costa (D) (Note: Resigned November 19, 1990 to become director of the Division of Alcoholic Beverage Control)	Thomas P. Foy (D)	Barbara Kalik (D)
1990–1991	Catherine A. Costa (D)	Thomas P. Foy (D) (Note: Appointed to the Senate on December 13, 1990)	Barbara Kalik (D)
1990–1991	Thomas P. Foy (D)	Jack Casey (D) (Note: Appointed to the Assembly on January 17, 1991)	Barbara Kalik (D)
1992–1993	Bradford S. Smith (R)	Priscilla B. Anderson (R)	José F. Sosa (R)
1994–1995	Jack Casey (D)	Steven M. Petrillo (D)	George E. Williams (D)
1994–1995	Jack Casey (D)	Steven M. Petrillo (D)	George E. Williams (R) (Note: Switched parties on June 27, 1995)
1996–1997	Jack Casey (D)	Diane Allen (R)	Carmine DeSopo (R)
1998–1999	Diane Allen (R)	Herb Conaway (D)	Jack Conners (D) (Note: Removed from his seat in September 1998 as a result of election irregularities in the 1997 election)
1998–1999	Diane Allen (R)	Herb Conaway (D)	Ken Faulkner (R) (Note: Appointed to the Assembly on September 17, 1998)
1998–1999	Diane Allen (R)	Herb Conaway (D)	Jack Conners (D) (Note: Elected in a November 1998 special election, sworn in on November 23, 1998)
2000–2001	Diane Allen (R)	Herb Conaway (D)	Jack Conners (D)
2002–2003	Diane Allen (R)	Herb Conaway (D)	Jack Conners (D)
2004–2005	Diane Allen (R)	Herb Conaway (D)	Jack Conners (D)
2006–2007	Diane Allen (R)	Herb Conaway (D)	Jack Conners (D)
2008–2009	Diane Allen (R)	Herb Conaway (D)	Jack Conners (D)
2010–2011	Diane Allen (R)	Herb Conaway (D)	Jack Conners (D) (Note: Resigned on August 26, 2011)
2010–2011	Diane Allen (R)	Herb Conaway (D)	Troy Singleton (D) (Note: Appointed to the Assembly on November 21, 2011)
2012–2013	Diane Allen (R)	Herb Conaway (D)	Troy Singleton (D)
2014–2015	Diane Allen (R)	Herb Conaway (D)	Troy Singleton (D)
2016–2017	Diane Allen (R)	Herb Conaway (D)	Troy Singleton (D)
2018–2019	Troy Singleton (D)	Herb Conaway (D)	Carol A. Murphy (D)
2020–2021	Troy Singleton (D)	Herb Conaway (D)	Carol A. Murphy (D)
2022–2023	Troy Singleton (D)	Herb Conaway (D)	Carol A. Murphy (D)
2024–2025	Troy Singleton (D)	Herb Conaway (D) (Note: Resigned January 1, 2025 to become a member of the United States House of Representatives)	Carol A. Murphy (D)
2024–2025	Troy Singleton (D)	Balvir Singh (D) (Note: Appointed to the Assembly on January 30, 2025)	Carol A. Murphy (D)
2026–2027	Troy Singleton (D)	Balvir Singh (D)	Carol A. Murphy (D)

== Election results, 1973–present ==
=== Senate ===
2021 New Jersey general election
Party	Candidate	Votes	%	±%
Democratic	Troy Singleton	46,619	62.3	▼3.4
Republican	Michelle Arnold	28,226	37.7	▲3.4
Total votes		74,845	100.0	

New Jersey general election, 2017
Party	Candidate	Votes	%	±%
Democratic	Troy Singleton	40,685	65.7	▲26.1
Republican	John Browne	21,229	34.3	▼26.1
Total votes		61,914	100.0	

New Jersey general election, 2013
Party	Candidate	Votes	%	±%
Republican	Diane Allen	38,350	60.4	▲3.4
Democratic	Gary Catrambone	25,106	39.6	▼3.4
Total votes		63,456	100.0	

2011 New Jersey general election
Party	Candidate	Votes	%
Republican	Diane Allen	27,011	57.0
Democratic	Gail Cook	20,370	43.0
Total votes		47,381	100.0

2007 New Jersey general election
Party	Candidate	Votes	%	±%
Republican	Diane Allen	23,185	55.6	▼4.7
Democratic	Richard S. Dennison Jr.	18,511	44.4	▲4.7
Total votes		41,696	100.0	

2003 New Jersey general election
Party	Candidate	Votes	%	±%
Republican	Diane Allen	26,341	60.3	▲6.2
Democratic	Diane F. Gabriel	17,331	39.7	▼6.2
Total votes		43,672	100.0	

2001 New Jersey general election
Party	Candidate	Votes	%
Republican	Diane Allen	29,756	54.1
Democratic	Lou Gallagher	25,293	45.9
Total votes		55,049	100.0

1997 New Jersey general election
Party	Candidate	Votes	%	±%
Republican	Diane Allen	30,875	53.7	▲5.5
Democratic	Robert P. Broderick	25,501	44.4	▼6.0
Conservative	Norman E. Wahner	1,121	1.9	N/A
Total votes		57,497	100.0	

1993 New Jersey general election
Party	Candidate	Votes	%	±%
Democratic	John “Jack” Casey	27,995	50.4	▲4.0
Republican	Bradford S. Smith	26,795	48.2	▼5.4
United Independents	James C. Lewis	789	1.4	N/A
Total votes		55,579	100.0	

1991 New Jersey general election
Party	Candidate	Votes	%
Republican	Bradford S. Smith	26,892	53.6
Democratic	Thomas P. Foy	23,290	46.4
Total votes		50,182	100.0

1987 New Jersey general election
Party	Candidate	Votes	%	±%
Democratic	Catherine A. Costa	27,244	63.4	▲0.3
Republican	James A. Bristow	15,745	36.6	▼0.3
Total votes		42,989	100.0	

1983 New Jersey general election
Party	Candidate	Votes	%	±%
Democratic	Catherine A. Costa	26,697	63.1	▲6.0
Republican	Henry W. Metzger	15,616	36.9	▼6.0
Total votes		42,313	100.0	

1981 New Jersey general election
Party	Candidate	Votes	%
Democratic	Herman T. Costello	31,172	57.1
Republican	Michael J. Conda	23,391	42.9
Total votes		54,563	100.0

1977 New Jersey general election
Party	Candidate	Votes	%	±%
Democratic	Charles B. Yates	30,793	59.5	▲1.6
Republican	Michael J. Conda	20,971	40.5	▼1.1
Total votes		51,764	100.0	

1973 New Jersey general election
Party	Candidate	Votes	%
Democratic	Edward J. Hughes, Jr.	26,863	57.9
Republican	Walter L. Smith, Jr.	19,317	41.6
Socialist Labor	Bernardo S. Doganiero	231	0.5
Total votes		46,411	100.0

=== General Assembly ===
2021 New Jersey general election
Party	Candidate	Votes	%	±%
Democratic	Herb Conaway	45,728	31.0	▼6.5
Democratic	Carol Murphy	45,170	30.6	▼7.1
Republican	Douglas Dillon	28,579	19.4	▼3.3
Republican	Joseph Jesuele	28,139	19.1	N/A
Total votes		147,616	100.0	

2019 New Jersey general election
Party	Candidate	Votes	%	±%
Democratic	Carol Murphy	29,886	37.7	▲5.4
Democratic	Herb Conaway	29,709	37.5	▲4.4
Republican	Peter H. Miller	17,957	22.7	▲5.3
True Blue Unbossed	Kathleen Cooley	1,723	2.2	N/A
Total votes		79,275	100.0	

New Jersey general election, 2017
Party	Candidate	Votes	%	±%
Democratic	Herb Conaway	39,879	33.1	▲2.1
Democratic	Carol Murphy	38,819	32.3	▲2.0
Republican	Octavia Scott	20,941	17.4	▼2.2
Republican	Robert Thibault	20,726	17.2	▼2.0
Total votes		120,365	100.0	

New Jersey general election, 2015
Party	Candidate	Votes	%	±%
Democratic	Herb Conaway	22,559	31.0	▲3.0
Democratic	Troy Singleton	22,056	30.3	▲2.5
Republican	Bill Conley	14,272	19.6	▼2.8
Republican	Rob Prisco	13,949	19.2	▼2.6
Total votes		72,836	100.0	

New Jersey general election, 2013
Party	Candidate	Votes	%	±%
Democratic	Herb Conaway	34,978	28.0	▲1.8
Democratic	Troy Singleton	34,772	27.8	▲2.2
Republican	Anthony Ogozalek	27,991	22.4	▼1.9
Republican	Jeff Banasz	27,233	21.8	▼2.1
Total votes		124,974	100.0	

New Jersey general election, 2011
Party	Candidate	Votes	%
Democratic	Herb Conaway	23,908	26.2
Democratic	Troy Singleton	23,403	25.6
Republican	James "Jim" Keenan	22,144	24.3
Republican	Christopher Halgas	21,828	23.9
Total votes		91,283	100.0

New Jersey general election, 2009
Party	Candidate	Votes	%	±%
Democratic	Herb Conaway	36,127	31.9	▲3.7
Democratic	Jack Conners	35,156	31.0	▲3.0
Republican	Leah J. Arter	21,332	18.8	▼3.2
Republican	Harry Adams	20,763	18.3	▼3.5
Write-In	Personal choice	20	0.02	N/A
Total votes		113,398	100.0	

New Jersey general election, 2007
Party	Candidate	Votes	%	±%
Democratic	Herb Conaway	22,865	28.2	▼4.6
Democratic	Jack Conners	22,760	28.0	▼4.2
Republican	Brian Propp	17,843	22.0	▲4.0
Republican	Nancy Griffin	17,741	21.8	▲4.8
Total votes		81,209	100.0	

New Jersey general election, 2005
Party	Candidate	Votes	%	±%
Democratic	Herb Conaway	36,221	32.8	▲6.6
Democratic	Jack Conners	35,562	32.2	▲6.1
Republican	Joe Donnelly	19,902	18.0	▼6.4
Republican	Mike Savala	18,718	17.0	▼6.3
Total votes		110,403	100.0	

New Jersey general election, 2003
Party	Candidate	Votes	%	±%
Democratic	Herb Conaway	22,161	26.2	▼3.3
Democratic	Jack Conners	22,059	26.1	▼3.6
Republican	Jean Stanfield	20,600	24.4	▲4.1
Republican	Mike Savala	19,727	23.3	▲3.6
Total votes		84,547	100.0	

New Jersey general election, 2001
Party	Candidate	Votes	%
Democratic	Jack Conners	31,703	29.7
Democratic	Herb Conaway	31,547	29.5
Republican	Clara Ruvolo	21,740	20.3
Republican	Aubrey A. Fenton	21,066	19.7
Conservative	Hosey Best	850	0.8
Total votes		106,906	100.0

New Jersey general election, 1999
Party	Candidate	Votes	%	±%
Democratic	Jack Conners	20,667	27.7	▲3.1
Democratic	Herb Conaway, MD	20,517	27.5	▲2.9
Republican	Gary Daniels	16,086	21.6	▼2.9
Republican	Clara Ruvolo	15,338	20.6	▼1.9
Conservative	Norman E. Wahner	1,025	1.4	▲0.4
Conservative	Hosey Best	896	1.2	▲0.1
Total votes		74,529	100.0	

Special election, November 3, 1998
Party	Candidate	Votes	%
Democratic	Jack Conners	26,272	55.0
Republican	Ken Faulkner	20,634	43.2
Conservative	Raymond Hellings	855	1.8
Total votes		47,761	100.0

New Jersey general election, 1997
Party	Candidate	Votes	%	±%
Democratic	Herbert C. Conaway, Jr.	27,447	24.63	▲3.2
Democratic	Jack Conners	27,402	24.59	▲3.4
Republican	Ken Faulkner	27,335	24.53	▼3.2
Republican	George Williams	25,122	22.5	▼3.0
Conservative	Hosey Best	1,257	1.1	N/A
Conservative	Raymond Hellings	1,091	1.0	N/A
Reform	Carmen S. Zarrelli	900	0.8	N/A
Reform	George Guzdek	880	0.8	▼0.7
Total votes		111,434	100.0	

New Jersey general election, 1995
Party	Candidate	Votes	%	±%
Republican	Diane Allen	22,242	27.7	▲5.6
Republican	Carmine De Sopo	20,480	25.5	▲3.6
Democratic	Steven M. Petrillo	17,129	21.4	▼6.7
Democratic	Joseph P. Dugan	17,014	21.2	▼6.8
U.S. Taxpayers	Dixie Lee Patterson	1,386	1.7	N/A
Moderate Independent	George Guzdek	1,188	1.5	N/A
Natural Law	Susan H. Normandin	453	0.6	N/A
Natural Law	Charles L. Normandin	314	0.4	N/A
Total votes		80,206	100.0	

New Jersey general election, 1993
Party	Candidate	Votes	%	±%
Democratic	Steven M. Petrillo	30,982	28.1	▲3.9
Democratic	George E. Williams	30,896	28.0	▲4.5
Republican	Jose F. Sosa	24,354	22.1	▼4.0
Republican	Priscilla B. Anderson	24,122	21.9	▼4.3
Total votes		110,354	100.0	

1991 New Jersey general election
Party	Candidate	Votes	%
Republican	Priscilla B. Anderson	25,989	26.2
Republican	Jose F. Sosa	25,925	26.1
Democratic	Barbara Faith Kalik	23,953	24.2
Democratic	John “Jack” Casey	23,307	23.5
Total votes		99,174	100.0

1989 New Jersey general election
Party	Candidate	Votes	%	±%
Democratic	Barbara Faith Kalik	34,280	32.4	▲2.2
Democratic	Thomas P. Foy	34,196	32.3	▲3.1
Republican	Renee L. Borstad	18,709	17.7	▼2.3
Republican	Vincent R. Farias	18,570	17.6	▼2.9
Total votes		105,755	100.0	

1987 New Jersey general election
Party	Candidate	Votes	%	±%
Democratic	Barbara Faith Kalik	25,388	30.2	▲0.8
Democratic	Thomas P. Foy	24,539	29.2	▲1.2
Republican	Vincent R. Farias	17,269	20.5	▼0.7
Republican	Renee L. Borstad	16,831	20.0	▼1.4
Total votes		84,027	100.0	

1985 New Jersey general election
Party	Candidate	Votes	%	±%
Democratic	Barbara Faith Kalik	26,452	29.4	▼1.3
Democratic	Thomas P. Foy	25,217	28.0	▼1.8
Republican	Renee L. Borstad	19,318	21.4	▲0.3
Republican	Charles J. Ansert	19,096	21.2	▲2.9
Total votes		90,083	100.0	

New Jersey general election, 1983
Party	Candidate	Votes	%	±%
Democratic	Barbara Faith Kalik	25,248	30.7	▲1.3
Democratic	Thomas P. Foy	24,480	29.8	▼1.1
Republican	Michael J. Conda	17,378	21.1	▲1.0
Republican	Betty Lou Barnard	15,075	18.3	▼1.3
Total votes		82,181	100.0	

New Jersey general election, 1981
Party	Candidate	Votes	%
Democratic	Catherine A. Costa	33,296	30.9
Democratic	Barbara F. Kalik	31,668	29.4
Republican	Bradford S. Smith	21,657	20.1
Republican	Lorraine Schmierer	21,128	19.6
Total votes		107,749	100.0

New Jersey general election, 1979
Party	Candidate	Votes	%	±%
Democratic	Herman T. Costello	20,658	26.8	▼3.9
Democratic	Barbara F. Kalik	19,273	25.0	▼1.7
Republican	Henry W. Metzger	17,923	23.3	▲2.9
Republican	C. William Haines, Jr.	17,825	23.2	▲1.0
Policeman-Fireman-Condominium	Joseph M. Whylings, Jr.	495	0.6	N/A
Independence 7th District	James Morton	453	0.6	N/A
Socialist Labor	Bernardo S. Doganiero	199	0.3	N/A
Socialist Labor	Andrew P. Byus	121	0.2	N/A
Total votes		76,947	100.0	

New Jersey general election, 1977
Party	Candidate	Votes	%	±%
Democratic	Herman T. Costello	30,543	30.7	▲3.4
Democratic	Barbara F. Kalik	26,538	26.7	▼0.5
Republican	C. William Haines, Jr.	22,086	22.2	▲0.6
Republican	Bennett E. Bozarth	20,278	20.4	▼1.8
Total votes		99,445	100.0	

Special election, November 2, 1976
Party	Candidate	Votes	%
Democratic	Herman T. Costello	35,126	52.5
Republican	Walter L. Smith	31,771	47.5
Total votes		66,897	100.0

New Jersey general election, 1975
Party	Candidate	Votes	%	±%
Democratic	Charles B. Yates	22,026	27.3	▼5.6
Democratic	George H. Barbour	21,990	27.2	▼4.5
Republican	Bennett E. Bozarth	17,941	22.2	▲4.1
Republican	John F. Vassallo, Jr.	17,466	21.6	▲4.3
No New Taxes	Joseph Pasquariello	895	1.1	N/A
Socialist Labor	Bernardo S. Doganiero	466	0.6	N/A
Total votes		80,784	100.0	

New Jersey general election, 1973
Party	Candidate	Votes	%
Democratic	Charles B. Yates	29,733	32.9
Democratic	George H. Barbour	28,578	31.7
Republican	Ralph A. Skowron	16,301	18.1
Republican	William R. Hawks	15,633	17.3
Total votes		90,245	100.0

== Election results, 1965–1973 ==
=== Senate ===
1965 New Jersey general election
Party	Candidate	Votes	%
Democratic	John A. Lynch	114,955	34.2
Democratic	J. Edward Crabiel	111,893	33.3
Republican	Edgar Hellriegel	55,154	16.4
Republican	Albert L. Ichel	54,470	16.2
Total votes		336,472	100.0

1967 New Jersey general election
Party	Candidate	Votes	%
Democratic	John A. Lynch	77,363	18.2
Democratic	J. Edward Crabiel	74,784	17.6
Democratic	Norman Tanzman	74,739	17.6
Republican	John A. Bradley	66,876	15.7
Republican	William Shelley	66,102	15.5
Republican	Edgar J. Hellriegel	65,447	15.4
Total votes		425,311	100.0

1971 New Jersey general election
Party	Candidate	Votes	%
Democratic	John A. Lynch	94,832	20.4
Democratic	J. Edward Crabiel	92,637	19.9
Democratic	Norman Tanzman	92,450	19.8
Republican	Leonard A. Tobias	61,672	13.2
Republican	Francis J. Coury	61,043	13.1
Republican	Charles C. Griffith	59,788	12.8
Americans For ERG	Edward R. Gavarny	3,547	0.8
Total votes		465,969	100.0

=== General Assembly ===
==== District 7A ====
New Jersey general election, 1967
Party	Candidate	Votes	%
Republican	Peter P. Garibaldi	23,514	25.5
Republican	Richard A. Olsen	23,189	25.19
Democratic	John P. Kozak	23,110	25.10
Democratic	Frank M. Deiner, Jr.	22,241	24.2
Total votes		92,054	100.0

New Jersey general election, 1969
Party	Candidate	Votes	%
Republican	Robert K. Haelig, Jr.	31,796	27.9
Republican	Peter P. Garibaldi	31,452	27.6
Democratic	Herbert M. Tanzman	26,157	23.0
Democratic	Daniel W. Horgan	24,515	21.5
Total votes		113,920	100.0

New Jersey general election, 1971
Party	Candidate	Votes	%
Democratic	William J. Hamilton, Jr.	25,081	25.21
Republican	Peter P. Garibaldi	24,972	25.11
Democratic	Joseph C. Valenti, Jr.	24,857	24.99
Republican	Robert K. Haelig, Jr.	24,549	24.7
Total votes		99,459	100.0

==== District 7B ====
New Jersey general election, 1967
Party	Candidate	Votes	%
Republican	Robert K. Haelig, Jr.	25,419	25.9
Republican	Francis J. Coury	24,766	25.2
Democratic	Joseph C. Doren	24,153	24.6
Democratic	Edwin A. Kolodziej	23,960	24.4
Total votes		98,298	100.0

New Jersey general election, 1969
Party	Candidate	Votes	%
Republican	Donald Macrae	35,862	27.0
Republican	Martin E. Kravarik	34,888	26.3
Democratic	David M. Foley	31,386	23.6
Democratic	Martin A. Spritzer	30,593	23.0
Total votes		132,729	100.0

New Jersey general election, 1971
Party	Candidate	Votes	%
Democratic	James Bornheimer	25,762	27.4
Democratic	John H. Froude	24,431	26.0
Republican	Martin E. Kravarik	22,916	24.4
Republican	Joseph Patrick Leo	20,860	22.2
Total votes		93,969	100.0

==== District 7C ====
New Jersey general election, 1967
Party	Candidate	Votes	%
Democratic	John J. Fay, Jr.	26,540	29.3
Democratic	Robert N. Wilentz	26,113	28.8
Republican	Herbert Berry	19,250	21.2
Republican	Daniel R. Kosteck	18,760	20.7
Total votes		90,663	100.0

New Jersey general election, 1969
Party	Candidate	Votes	%
Democratic	John J. Fay, Jr.	29,758	27.9
Democratic	Thomas Deverin	29,614	27.8
Republican	Andrew Banick	23,665	22.2
Republican	Frederick W. Richards	23,658	22.2
Total votes		106,695	100.0

New Jersey general election, 1971
Party	Candidate	Votes	%
Democratic	John J. Fay, Jr.	35,583	32.2
Democratic	Thomas Deverin	33,746	30.5
Republican	James W. Inman	21,540	19.5
Republican	Kenneth Oleckna	19,697	17.8
Total votes		110,566	100.0

==== District 7 at-large ====
New Jersey general election, 1971
Party	Candidate	Votes	%
Democratic	Edwin A. Kolodziej	82,526	52.9
Republican	Julius Belso	50,446	32.3
Independent Candidate	Arthur H. Stock	23,017	14.8
Total votes		155,989	100.0
