= Edward J. Hughes Jr. =

American politician

Member of the New Jersey Senate
- In office January 11, 1972 – January 10, 1978
- Preceded by: District created
- Succeeded by: Charles B. Yates
- Constituency: District 4C (1972–74); 7th district (1974–78)

Personal details
- Party: Democratic

Edward J. Hughes Jr. is an American businessman and Democratic Party politician who served in the New Jersey Senate from 1972 to 1978.

In the June 1977 Democratic primary, Assemblyman Charles B. Yates knocked off Hughes in his bid for re-election and went on to win the Senate seat in the general election.
