= Troy Singleton =

Member of the New Jersey Senate

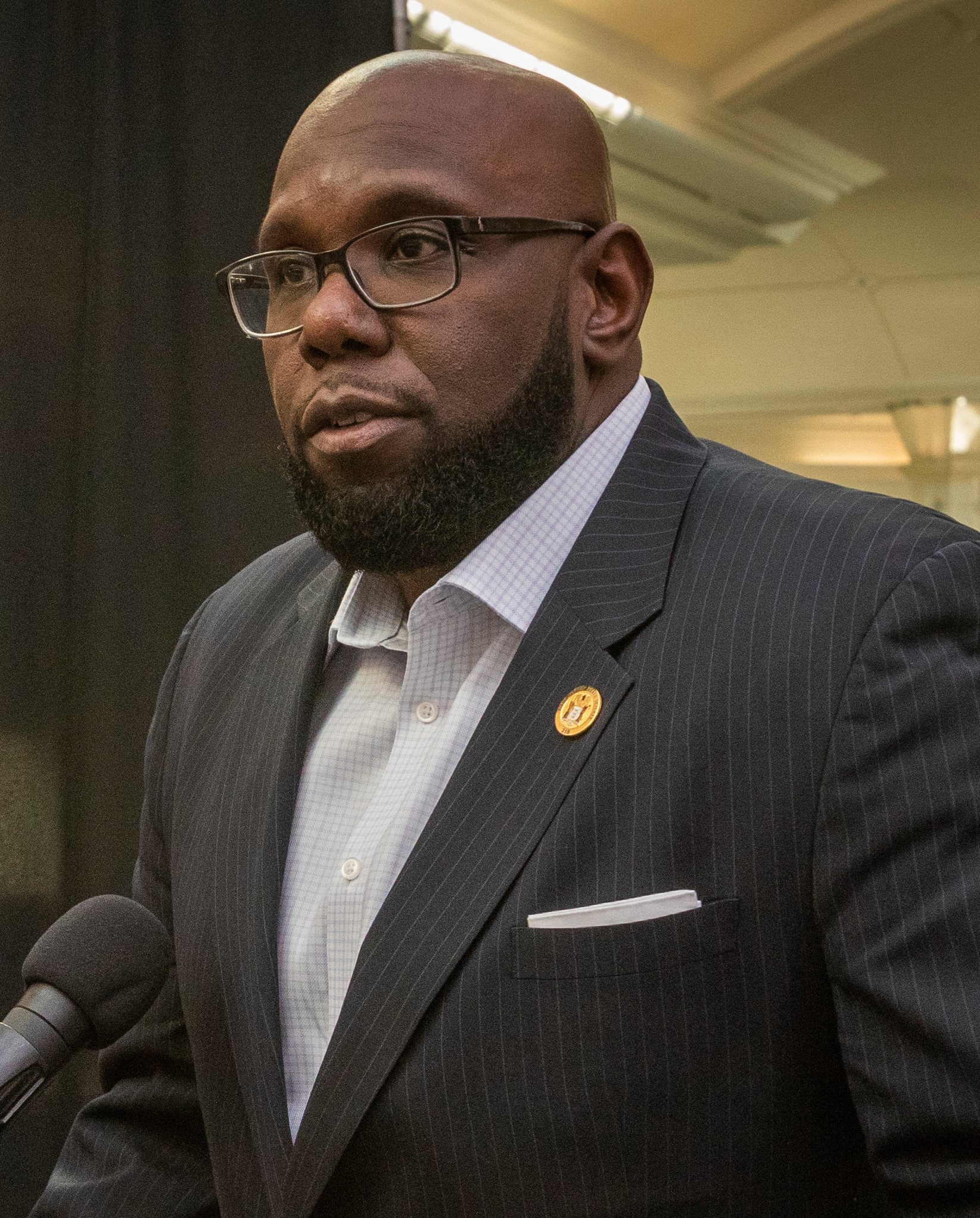

Member of the New Jersey Senate from the 7th district
- Incumbent
- Assumed office January 9, 2018
- Preceded by: Diane Allen

Member of the New Jersey General Assembly from the 7th district
- In office November 21, 2011 – January 9, 2018
- Preceded by: Jack Conners
- Succeeded by: Carol A. Murphy

Personal details
- Born: June 30, 1973 (age 53) Philadelphia, Pennsylvania, U.S.
- Party: Democratic
- Spouse: Megan Singleton
- Children: 3
- Education: Rowan University (BS)
- Website: Assembly website

Troy E. Singleton (born June 30, 1973) is an American Democratic Party politician who has represented the 7th Legislative District in the New Jersey Senate since January 9, 2018. He served in the New Jersey General Assembly from November 21, 2011 until he took office in the state senate.

Singleton has served as the Majority Whip in the Senate since 2022.

== Early life ==
Singleton was born on June 30, 1973, in Philadelphia and raised in Willingboro Township, New Jersey. He graduated from Willingboro High School and earned a B.S. degree in business administration from Rowan University. He is a member of the United Brotherhood of Carpenters and Joiners of America Local 715 and serves as President of the New Jersey Carpenter Contractor Trust. He has been a commissioner of the Burlington County Bridge Commission since 2009, the New Jersey Turnpike Authority Commission (2009–11), and the Rowan University Board of Trustees (2009–11). He was deputy executive director of the New Jersey Democratic State Committee in 2001. He is also a member of the United Brotherhood of Carpenters and Joiners of America (UBC) Local 255 and currently serves as the Assistant to the Executive. Secretary-Treasurer of the Northeast Regional Council of Carpenters. Troy was a member of the Board of Trustees of the Boys & Girls Club of Camden County.

He has been a resident of Palmyra.

== New Jersey Assembly ==
On March 29, 2011, Jack Conners announced that, due to redistricting, he would not seek another term to the Assembly in 2011. He announced his resignation on August 26, 2011, effective immediately to accept a position with Camden County as its director of veterans' affairs. Singleton was selected by the Burlington County and Camden County Democratic committees to fill the vacant seat, and he defended it as an incumbent in the general election. He was sworn in on November 21, 2011, to finish the remainder of Conners' term and was sworn into his first full term on January 10, 2012.

== New Jersey Senate ==
Singleton ran for the Senate in the 2017 election after longtime Republican Senator Diane Allen announced her retirement due to health issues, after nearly two decades in the senate. His election was one of the two seats gained by Democrats made in the legislature that year. He was sworn in at the start of the 218th Legislature.

In 2021, Singleton sponsored legislation that would legalize accessory dwelling units in New Jersey, making it possible for homeowners to turn parts of their house into an extra apartment.

=== Committee assignments ===
Committee assignments for the 2024—2025 Legislative Session are:

- Community and Urban Affairs (as chair)
- Health, Human Services and Senior Citizens (as vice-chair)
- Judiciary

=== District 7 ===
Each of the 40 districts in the New Jersey Legislature has one representative in the New Jersey Senate and two members in the New Jersey General Assembly. The representatives from the 7th District for the 2024—2025 Legislative Session are:

- Senator Troy Singleton (D)
- Assemblyman Herb Conaway (D)
- Assemblywoman Carol A. Murphy (D)

== Electoral history ==
=== Senate ===
7th Legislative District General Election, 2023
Party	Candidate	Votes	%
Democratic	Troy Singleton (incumbent)	33,711	67.7
Republican	James A. Fazzone	16,060	32.3
Total votes		49,771	100.0
Democratic hold			

New Jersey general election, 2021
Party	Candidate	Votes	%	±%
Democratic	Troy Singleton	46,619	62.3	▼3.4
Republican	Michelle Arnold	28,226	37.7	▲3.4
Total votes		74,845	100.0	

New Jersey general election, 2017
Party	Candidate	Votes	%	±%
Democratic	Troy Singleton	40,685	65.7	▲26.1
Republican	John Browne	21,229	34.3	▼26.1
Total votes		61,914	100.0	

=== Assembly ===
New Jersey general election, 2015
Party	Candidate	Votes	%	±%
Democratic	Herb Conaway	22,559	30.6	▲2.6
Democratic	Troy Singleton	22,056	29.9	▲2.1
Republican	Bill Conley	14,272	19.3	▼3.1
Republican	Rob Prisco	13,949	18.9	▼2.9
Total votes		72,836	100.0	

New Jersey general election, 2013
Party	Candidate	Votes	%	±%
Democratic	Herb Conaway	34,978	28.0	▲1.8
Democratic	Troy Singleton	34,772	27.8	▲2.2
Republican	Anthony Ogozalek	27,991	22.4	▼1.9
Republican	Jeff Banasz	27,233	21.8	▼2.1
Total votes		124,974	100.0	

New Jersey general election, 2011
Party	Candidate	Votes	%
Democratic	Herb Conaway	23,908	26.2
Democratic	Troy Singleton	23,403	25.6
Republican	James "Jim" Keenan	22,144	24.3
Republican	Christopher Halgas	21,828	23.9
Total votes		91,283	100.0
