= Balvir Singh =

American politician

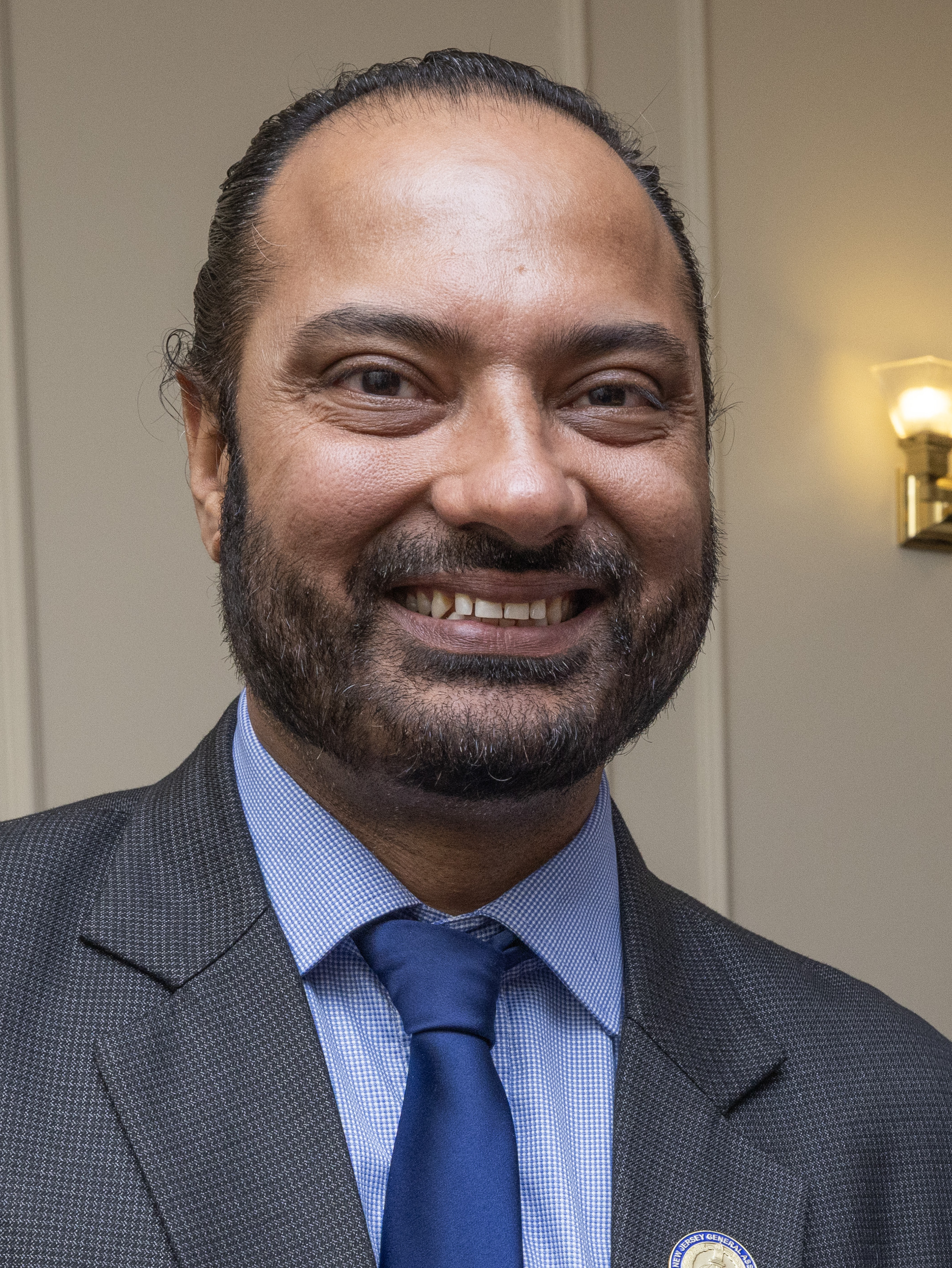
- Singh in 2025

Member of the New Jersey General Assembly from the 7th district
- Incumbent
- Assumed office January 30, 2025 Serving with Carol A. Murphy
- Preceded by: Herb Conaway

Member of the Burlington County Board of County Commissioners
- In office January 3, 2018 – January 30, 2025
- Preceded by: Linda Hughes
- Succeeded by: Randy Brolo

Member of Board of Education, Burlington Township School District
- In office January 7, 2015 – December 31, 2017

Personal details
- Born: November 9, 1984 (age 41) Punjab, India
- Party: Democratic
- Spouse: Sandeep Kaur (m. 2010)
- Children: 4
- Education: Burlington City High School
- Alma mater: The College of New Jersey (BA); Rutgers University (M.Sc.)
- Website: www.balvirsinghnj.com

Balvir Singh (born November 9, 1984) is an Indian-American educator and Democratic Party politician from Burlington Township, New Jersey, who has represented the 7th Legislative District in the New Jersey General Assembly since January 30, 2025. He previously served on the Burlington County Board of County Commissioners from 2018 to 2025. Singh is the first Asian American to win a countywide election in Burlington County and the first Sikh American to win a countywide election in the state of New Jersey.

== Burlington Township Board of Education ==
In 2014, Singh was elected to the board of education of the Burlington Township School District, coming in third among the five candidates seeking three open seats. As a board member, Singh served as Chair of the school district's finance committee. Over the three years Singh served in that role, taxes and overall spending increases were contained within the school district's budgets each year.

== Commissioner election ==
Singh announced his intention to run for Burlington County Board of County Commissioners in March 2017 with running mate Tom Pullion. During the course of the campaign, Singh criticized the all-Republican Burlington County Board for focusing on bringing warehouses to the region with developers obtaining millions of dollars in tax subsidies, and creating traffic issues in local communities. Singh was criticized by his Republican opponents for his support of tax increases while on the Burlington Township Board of Education and for his support of gubernatorial candidate Phil Murphy. The Republicans also ran social media ads claiming that Singh would harbor criminal immigrants and support sanctuary city policies if elected. Singh stated after the election that such immigration policies fall out his jurisdiction as a Freeholder, and therefore were irrelevant points to be made.

In October 2017, it was revealed by the Burlington County Times that the Burlington County Democratic Committee sent more funds outside of the county to assist New Jersey Senate President Stephen M. Sweeney than they spent within the county to support Singh and Pullion's election. On election day, Singh and Pullion were declared the victors by a narrow margin in an election where voter turnout was at a record low.

== Commissioner ==
Singh was sworn in to the Burlington County Board of County Commissioners on January 3, 2018. The oath of office was administered by Central New Jersey politician Vin Gopal, who was then Senator-Elect for New Jersey's 11th Legislative District. Gopal is the first Indian-American to be elected to New Jersey's State Senate.

Singh voted in favor of the 2018 county budget, which resulted in a reduction in property taxes. The budget also called for a cut in the amount of money going into the Burlington County farmland preservation and open space fund since only two farms had applied for the program during the 2018 fiscal year, and neither accepted the county's offer.

At the March 19, 2018, board meeting, A Republican commissioner introduced a resolution to expand the Burlington County Women's Advisory Council's size from 15 to 20 members. Singh and Pullion expressed concern that current members were being dismissed and that new members were being chosen without a public advertisement of the vacancies. The resolution passed along a party-line vote.

On June 13, 2018, Singh and Pullion cast dissenting votes on a motion to grant an $89,500 contract for architectural services for security studies within the schools of Burlington County. During the meeting, a resident addressed the Board and alleged that the firm had donated to Republican campaigns in the past. Singh and Pullion cited the firm that was granted the contract, alleging that the appointment had been made for political reasons.

In January 2019, Singh joined with fellow Democrats on the Board to rescind the county's so-called "double dipper ban," which would prohibit Burlington County from employing any individual already collecting a taxpayer-funded pension unless they agreed to freeze their pension payments. Singh argued that the ban prevented hiring experienced individuals for publicly funded jobs within the county.

== New Jersey General Assembly ==
The members of the Burlington County Democratic committee selected Singh to fill the General Assembly seat that became vacant when Herb Conaway resigned to take office in the U.S. House of Representatives.

Singh and fellow incumbent Carol A. Murphy both won new terms in the 2025 election, beating Republican candidates Doug Dillon and Dione Johnson by 2–1 margins.

== Personal life ==
Singh was born in India, and was raised in a small village in Punjab. He immigrated to the United States in 1999 with his family at the age of 14. He grew up in a one-bedroom apartment in Burlington City, where he attended Burlington City High School. Singh has been married to his wife, Sandeep Kaur, since 2010. The couple have four children: son Gaganjeet Singh, daughter Gurleen Kaur, son Avijeet Singh, and daughter Avleen Kaur. He is Sikh, and of Punjabi descent.

== Electoral history ==
=== Burlington County Board of Commissioners ===
Burlington County general election, 2023
Party	Candidate	Votes	%	±%
Democratic	Tom Pullion (incumbent)	59,271	29.45	▲0.82
Democratic	Balvir Singh (incumbent)	58,115	28.87	▲0.66
Republican	Alfonso Gambone	41,977	20.85	
Republican	Larry Vernamonti	41,830	20.78	
Total votes		201,193	99.95	
Democratic hold				

Burlington County general election, 2020
Party	Candidate	Votes	%	±%
Democratic	Tom Pullion (incumbent)	142,937	28.63	▲2.09
Democratic	Balvir Singh (incumbent)	140,850	28.21	▲3.07
Republican	John Adams	108,318	21.69	
Republican	Tinamarie Nicolo	106,972	21.42	
Total votes		499,077	99.95	▼0.02
Democratic hold				

Burlington County general election, 2017
Party	Candidate	Votes	%
Democratic	Tom Pullion	61,605	26.54
Democratic	Balvir Singh	58,354	25.14
Republican	Bruce Garganio	56,108	24.17
Republican	Linda Hughes	55,976	24.12
Total votes		232,043	99.97

=== Burlington Township Board of Education ===
Burlington Township Board of Education election, 2014
Candidate	Votes	%
Maryann McMahon-Nester	2,384	23.15
Milton Dilligard	2,272	22.06
Balvir Singh	2,158	20.95
Richard Lynch	1,860	18.06
Philip Bigelow	1,592	15.46
Total votes	10,266	99.68

== See also ==
- Indian Americans in New Jersey
