= Herb Conaway =

American politician (born 1963)

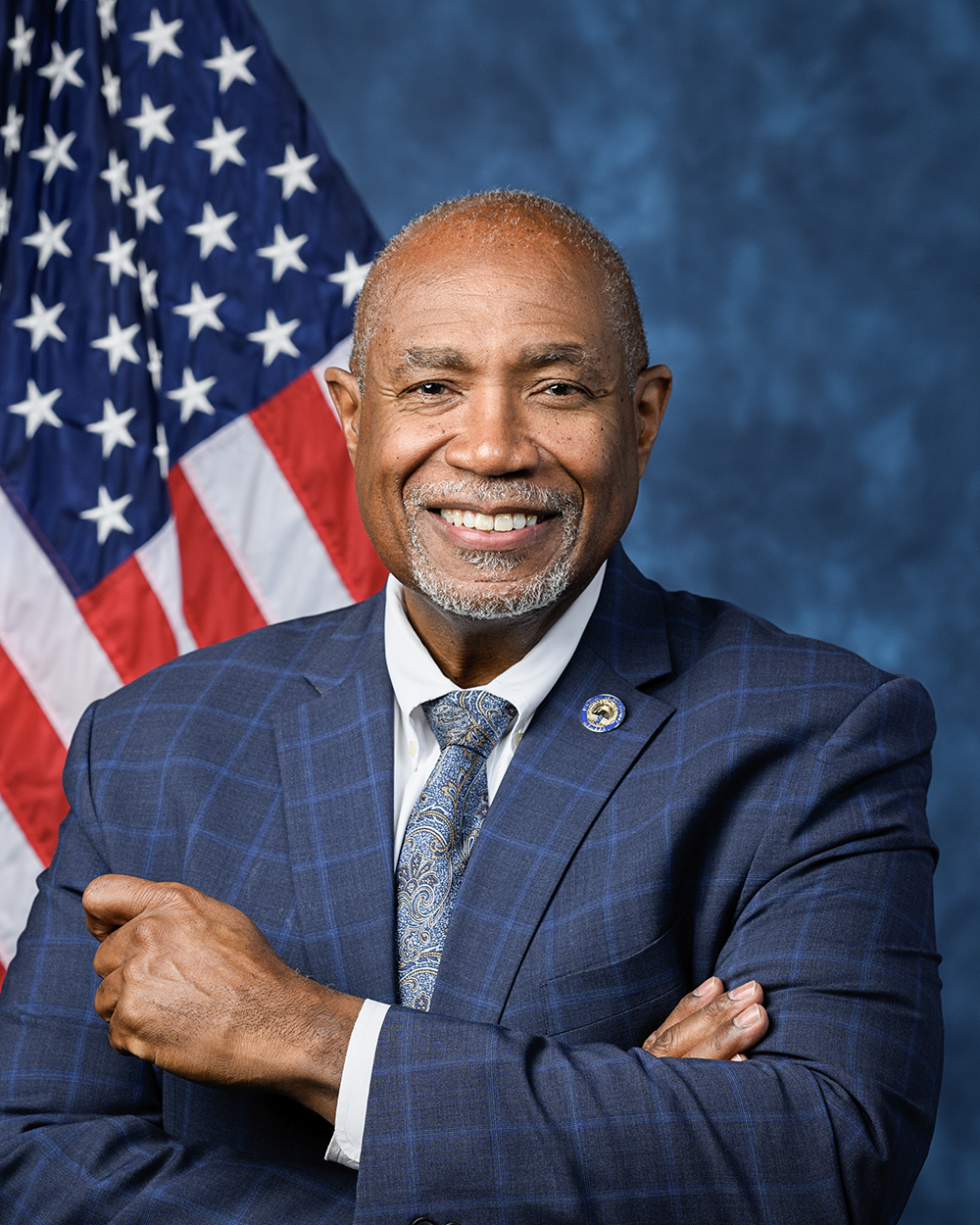
- Official portrait, 2024

Member of the U.S. House of Representatives from New Jersey's 3rd district
- Incumbent
- Assumed office January 3, 2025
- Preceded by: Andy Kim

Member of the New Jersey General Assembly from the 7th district
- In office January 13, 1998 – January 1, 2025
- Preceded by: Diane Allen
- Succeeded by: Balvir Singh

Personal details
- Born: Herbert Clark Hoover Conaway Jr. January 30, 1963 (age 63) Trenton, New Jersey, U.S.
- Party: Democratic
- Education: Princeton University (BA); Thomas Jefferson University (MD); Rutgers University, Camden (JD)
- Website: House website Campaign website

Military service
- Branch/service: United States Air Force
- Years of service: 1992–1996
- Rank: Captain

Herbert Clark Hoover Conaway Jr. (born January 30, 1963) is an American politician, physician, and former Air Force officer currently serving as the U.S. representative from New Jersey's 3rd congressional district since 2025. A member of the Democratic Party, he served in the New Jersey General Assembly from 1998 to 2025, where he represented the 7th legislative district.

Conaway served in the Assembly as the majority whip from 2014 to 2017, and was the deputy speaker from 2002 to 2005 and again starting in 2022. He won New Jersey's 3rd district in the 2024 U.S. House of Representatives election, where he ran as the Democratic nominee.

== Early life ==
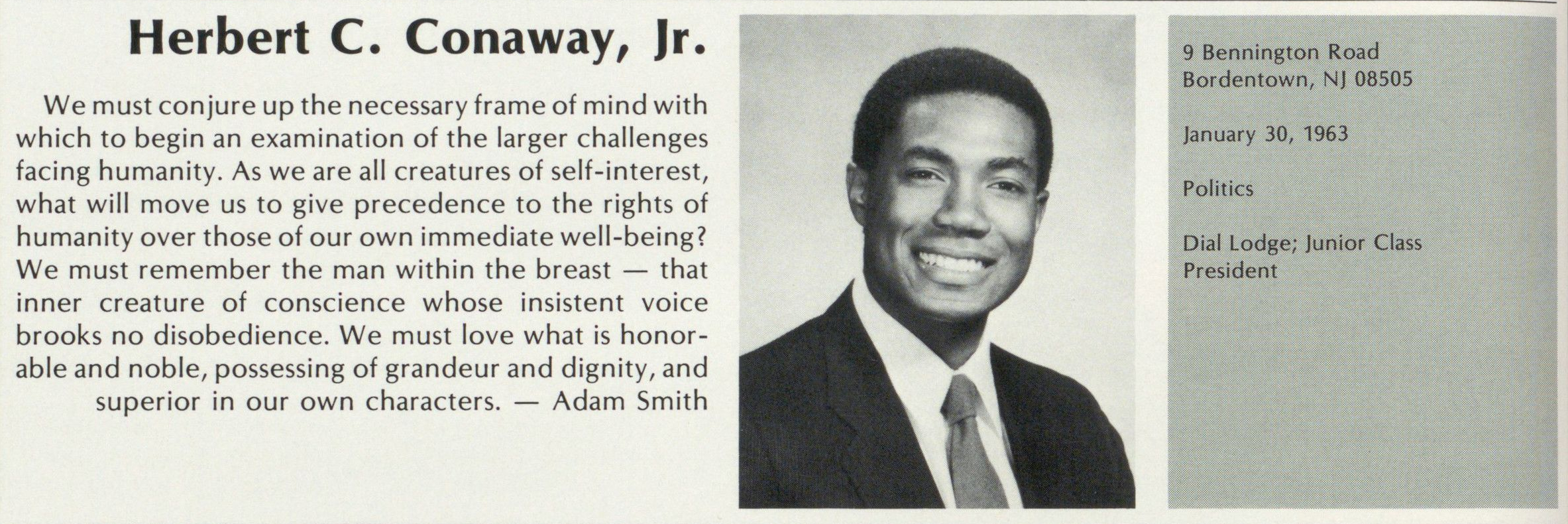
Conaway in the Princeton University yearbook, 1985

Conaway was born at St. Francis Medical Center in Trenton on January 30, 1963, to Eva Christine Conaway (née Godard), a nurse at the hospital, and Herb Conaway Sr., a history teacher at Bordentown Regional High School. He grew up in Bordentown, attending high school there. Conaway graduated with an Bachelor of Arts in politics from Princeton University in 1985 after completing a 67-page long senior thesis titled "Black Political Strategy." He then received a Doctor of Medicine degree from Jefferson Medical College at Thomas Jefferson University and was awarded a Juris Doctor from Rutgers School of Law—Newark. He is the only member of the legislature to hold both an M.D. degree and a J.D. degree.

Conaway served in the United States Air Force Medical Corps from 1992 to 1996, reaching the rank of Captain. He served at McGuire Air Force Base in Burlington County as general medical officer and as assistant director of the primary care clinic. He continues to practice medicine whilst serving in the legislature. He specializes in internal medicine and currently serves as director of the internal medicine clinic at St. Francis Medical Center in Trenton. He formerly worked at Cooper University Hospital and had a practice in Willingboro. Formerly a resident of Delanco Township, he now lives in Moorestown.

== New Jersey General Assembly ==
Conaway was first elected to the General Assembly from the 7th District in 1997 as the top vote getter. The same election saw his running mate and second-place finisher, Jack Conners, be seated then removed due to voting machine issues and replaced in September 1998 by Republican Kenneth William Faulkner. Conners was subsequently elected in a 1998 special election and the two served together from the 7th district from that point until 2011 when Conners resigned. Since late 2011, his Assembly associate from the district was Troy Singleton, until Singleton was elected to the New Jersey Senate. Since 2018, his Assembly associate has been Carol A. Murphy. He served as the Assembly's Deputy Speaker from 2002 to 2005.

Calling the proposed bill a "recipe for disaster" that could result in the spread of disease, Conaway opposed legislation proposed by Assemblywoman Charlotte Vandervalk that would give parents the right to exclude their children from mandatory vaccinations, after hearings held in March 2011 by the Assembly Health and Senior Services Committee. In 2019, Conaway supported legislation eliminating religious exemptions from mandatory vaccination requirements for students to be eligible to attend school.

=== Committee assignments ===
Committee assignments for the current session are:

- Health, Chair
- Budget
- Military and Veterans' Affairs

=== District 7 ===
Each of the 40 districts in the New Jersey Legislature has one representative in the New Jersey Senate and two members in the New Jersey General Assembly. The representatives from the 7th District for the 2024—2025 Legislative Session are:

- Senator Troy Singleton (D)
- Assemblyman Herb Conaway (D)
- Assemblywoman Carol A. Murphy (D)

== U.S. House of Representatives ==
=== Elections ===
Conaway first ran for the United States House of Representatives in 2004, challenging Republican incumbent Jim Saxton in New Jersey's 3rd congressional district. Saxton defeated Conaway by approximately 63 percent to 35 percent.

After Democratic incumbent Andy Kim announced that he would run for the U.S. Senate, Conaway entered the 2024 race for the 3rd congressional district. He defeated fellow state assemblymember Carol A. Murphy and three other candidates in the Democratic primary. Conaway then defeated Republican nominee Rajesh Mohan in the November general election, receiving 53.2 percent of the vote to Mohan's 44.6 percent. He took office on January 3, 2025.

=== 2026 ===
Conaway ran unopposed in the Democratic primary for reelection in 2026. Republican Michael McGuire, a former New York City police officer and military veteran, won the Republican primary and advanced to face Conaway in the November general election. On November 2, 2026 Conaway won a second term defeating McGuire.

=== Tenure ===
In July 2026, Conaway and Republican Representative Greg Murphy, both physicians, introduced the bipartisan Protecting Patients from Automated Denials Act. The bill would require physician review and approval of artificial-intelligence-assisted prior-authorization denials by Medicare Advantage plans and would authorize the Department of Health and Human Services to audit insurers' use of artificial intelligence in those decisions. The American Medical Association supported the legislation, saying physician oversight should remain part of Medicare Advantage prior-authorization decisions involving artificial intelligence.

=== Committee assignments ===
Conaway initially served on the House Committee on Small Business during the 119th Congress, but resigned from the committee on February 2, 2026. As of 2026, his committee assignments are:

==== Committee on Armed Services ====
- Subcommittee on Cyber, Information Technologies, and Innovation
- Subcommittee on Tactical Air and Land Forces

==== Committee on Veterans' Affairs (Vice Ranking Member) ====
- Subcommittee on Health
- Subcommittee on Oversight and Investigations

=== Caucus memberships ===
Among Conaway's caucus memberships are:

- Congressional Black Caucus
- Congressional Democratic Doctors Caucus
- Congressional Freethought Caucus
- House Baltic Caucus
- Labor Caucus
- New Democrat Coalition
- Reproductive Freedom Caucus
- For Country Caucus

== Electoral history ==
=== Congress ===
New Jersey's 3rd congressional district, 2024
Primary election
Party	Candidate	Votes	%
Democratic	Herb Conaway	27,528	49.62
Democratic	Carol A. Murphy	14,049	25.32
Democratic	Joe Cohn	6,517	11.75
Democratic	Sarah Schoengood	5,524	9.96
Democratic	Brian Schkeeper	1,862	3.36
Total votes		55,480	100.00
General election
Democratic	Herb Conaway	202,034	53.2
Republican	Rajesh Mohan	169,454	44.6
Green	Steven Welzer	3,478	0.9
Libertarian	Chris Russomanno	1,951	0.5
Independent	Douglas Wynn	1,332	0.3
Independent	Justin Barbera	1,235	0.3
Total votes		379,484	100.00

New Jersey's 3rd congressional district, 2004
Primary election
Party	Candidate	Votes	%
Democratic	Herb Conaway	11,731	100.00
Total votes		11,731	100.00
General election
Republican	Jim Saxton (incumbent)	195,938	63.44
Democratic	Herb Conaway	107,034	34.65
U.S. Marijuana Party	R. Edward Forchion	4,914	1.59
Libertarian	Frank Orland	976	0.32
Total votes		308,862	100.00

=== Assembly ===
7th Legislative District General Election, 2023
Party	Candidate	Votes	%
Democratic	Herbert C. Conaway Jr. (incumbent)	32,608	33.5
Democratic	Carol Murphy (incumbent)	31,936	32.8
Republican	Douglas Dillon	16,368	16.8
Republican	Eileen Bleistine	16,350	16.8
Total votes		97,262	100.0
Democratic hold			

New Jersey general election, 2021
Party	Candidate	Votes	%
Democratic	Herb Conaway	45,728	30.98%
Democratic	Carol Murphy	45,170	30.60%
Republican	Douglas Dillon	28,579	19.36%
Republican	Joseph Jesuele	28,139	19.06%
Total votes		147,616	100.0

New Jersey general election, 2017
Party	Candidate	Votes	%	±%
Democratic	Herb Conaway	39,879	33.1	▲2.5
Democratic	Carol Murphy	38,819	32.3	▲2.4
Republican	Octavia Scott	20,941	17.4	▼1.9
Republican	Robert Thibault	20,726	17.2	▼1.7
Total votes		120,365	100.0	

New Jersey general election, 2015
Party	Candidate	Votes	%	±%
Democratic	Herb Conaway	22,559	30.6	▲2.6
Democratic	Troy Singleton	22,056	29.9	▲2.1
Republican	Bill Conley	14,272	19.3	▼3.1
Republican	Rob Prisco	13,949	18.9	▼2.9
Total votes		72,836	100.0	

New Jersey general election, 2013
Party	Candidate	Votes	%	±%
Democratic	Herb Conaway	34,978	28.0	▲1.8
Democratic	Troy Singleton	34,772	27.8	▲2.2
Republican	Anthony Ogozalek	27,991	22.4	▼1.9
Republican	Jeff Banasz	27,233	21.8	▼2.1
Total votes		124,974	100.0	

New Jersey general election, 2011
Party	Candidate	Votes	%
Democratic	Herb Conaway	23,908	26.2
Democratic	Troy Singleton	23,403	25.6
Republican	James "Jim" Keenan	22,144	24.3
Republican	Christopher Halgas	21,828	23.9
Total votes		91,283	100.0

New Jersey general election, 2009
Party	Candidate	Votes	%	±%
Democratic	Herb Conaway	36,127	31.9	▲3.7
Democratic	Jack Conners	35,156	31.0	▲3.0
Republican	Leah J. Arter	21,332	18.8	▼3.2
Republican	Harry Adams	20,763	18.3	▼3.5
Write-In	Personal choice	20	0.02	N/A
Total votes		113,398	100.0	

New Jersey general election, 2007
Party	Candidate	Votes	%	±%
Democratic	Herb Conaway	22,865	28.2	▼4.6
Democratic	Jack Conners	22,760	28.0	▼4.2
Republican	Brian Propp	17,843	22.0	▲4.0
Republican	Nancy Griffin	17,741	21.8	▲4.8
Total votes		81,209	100.0	

New Jersey general election, 2005
Party	Candidate	Votes	%	±%
Democratic	Herb Conaway	36,221	32.8	▲6.6
Democratic	Jack Conners	35,562	32.2	▲6.1
Republican	Joe Donnelly	19,902	18.0	▼6.4
Republican	Mike Savala	18,718	17.0	▼6.3
Total votes		110,403	100.0	

New Jersey general election, 2003
Party	Candidate	Votes	%	±%
Democratic	Herb Conaway	22,161	26.2	▼3.3
Democratic	Jack Conners	22,059	26.1	▼3.6
Republican	Jean Stanfield	20,600	24.4	▲4.1
Republican	Mike Savala	19,727	23.3	▲3.6
Total votes		84,547	100.0	

New Jersey general election, 2001
Party	Candidate	Votes	%
Democratic	Jack Conners	31,703	29.7
Democratic	Herb Conaway	31,547	29.5
Republican	Clara Ruvolo	21,740	20.3
Republican	Aubrey A. Fenton	21,066	19.7
Conservative	Hosey Best	850	0.8
Total votes		106,906	100.0

New Jersey general election, 1999
Party	Candidate	Votes	%	±%
Democratic	Jack Conners	20,667	27.7	▲3.1
Democratic	Herb Conaway, MD	20,517	27.5	▲2.9
Republican	Gary Daniels	16,086	21.6	▼2.9
Republican	Clara Ruvolo	15,338	20.6	▼1.9
Conservative	Norman E. Wahner	1,025	1.4	▲0.4
Conservative	Hosey Best	896	1.2	▲0.1
Total votes		74,529	100.0	

New Jersey general election, 1997
Party	Candidate	Votes	%	±%
Democratic	Herbert C. Conaway Jr.	27,447	24.63	▲3.2
Democratic	Jack Conners	27,402	24.59	▲3.4
Republican	Ken Faulkner	27,335	24.53	▼3.2
Republican	George Williams	25,122	22.5	▼3.0
Conservative	Hosey Best	1,257	1.1	N/A
Conservative	Raymond Hellings	1,091	1.0	N/A
Reform	Carmen S. Zarrelli	900	0.8	N/A
Reform	George Guzdek	880	0.8	▼0.7
Total votes		111,434	100.0	

U.S. House of Representatives
Preceded by Andy Kim	Member of the U.S. House of Representatives from New Jersey's 3rd congressional district 2025–present	Incumbent
U.S. order of precedence (ceremonial)
Preceded by Janelle Bynum	United States representatives by seniority 372nd	Succeeded by Jeff Crank
