= Carol A. Murphy =

American politician

Carol Murphy
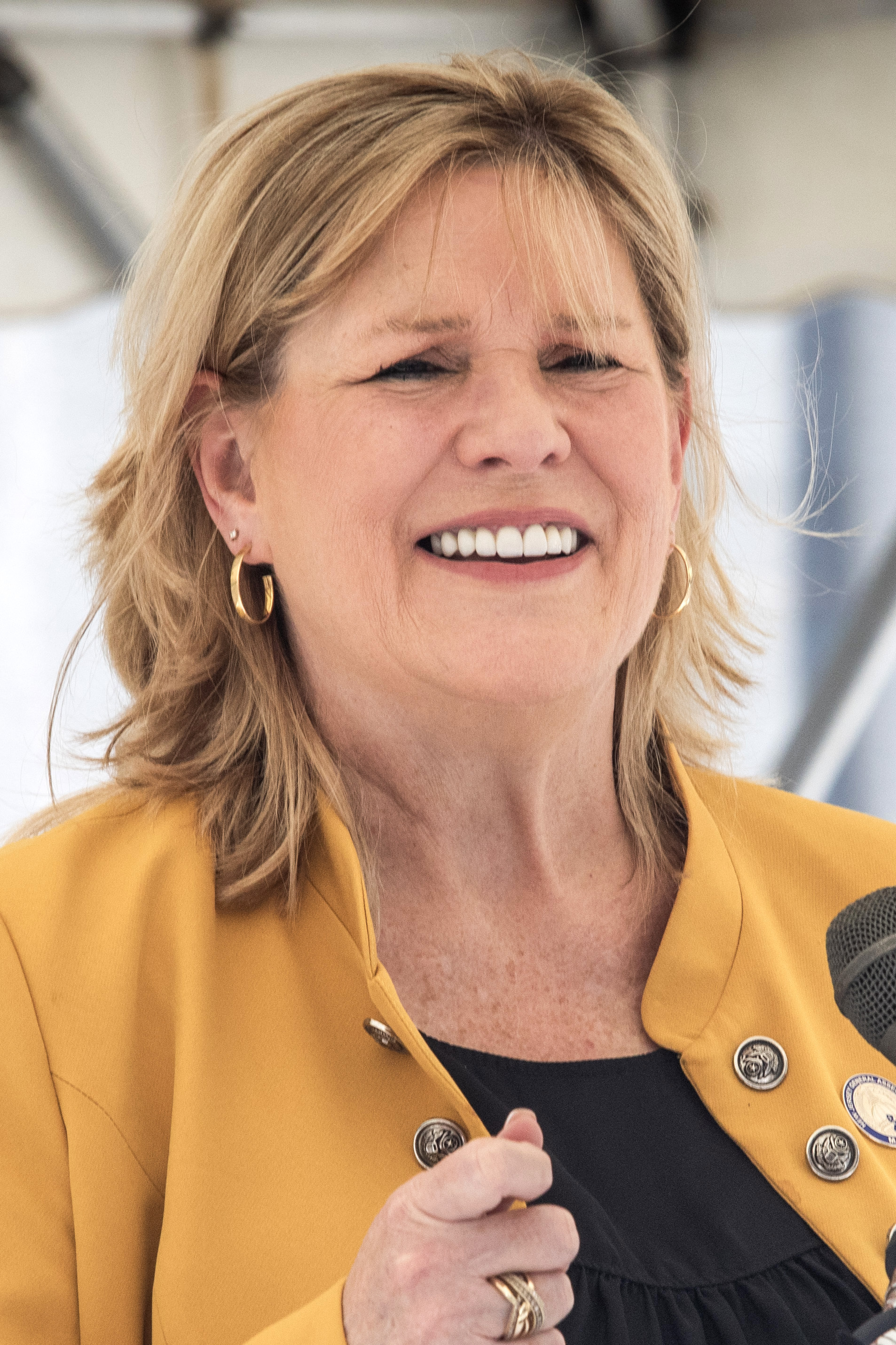

Member of the New Jersey General Assembly from the 7th district
- Incumbent
- Assumed office January 9, 2018 Serving with Balvir Singh (2025–present); Herb Conaway (2018–2025)
- Preceded by: Troy Singleton

Personal details
- Born: 1962 or 1963 (age 63–64)
- Party: Democratic
- Education: Camden County College; Kaplan University (AA)
- Website: Assembly website

Carol A. Murphy (born 1962 or 1963) is an American politician of the Democratic Party, who has served in the New Jersey General Assembly since January 9, 2018.

Murphy served in the General Assembly as the Deputy Majority Leader from 2020 to 2021 and has been the Majority Whip since 2022.

== Background ==
Murphy's father was an Army veteran and Bronze Star recipient who she credits as the reason she learned about the value of service. She was quoted as saying, "Like all of you, I’ve experienced tragedies and struggles. I want to be on the front lines during the toughest times, fighting for you in Trenton."

Prior to her time in the Assembly, she held several jobs in the public sector, including serving as Community Relations Manager for the New Jersey Schools Development Authority, Chief of Staff to state senator Linda R. Greenstein (District 14), and Director of Policy and Communication for Assemblywoman Gabriela Mosquera (District 4).

As of 2024, Murphy lives in Mount Laurel, New Jersey.

== New Jersey General Assembly ==
Murphy was elected to represent the state's 7th Legislative District in 2017, replacing Troy Singleton, who relinquished his seat to successfully run for the New Jersey Senate. She became the first woman to represent the 7th Legislative District in 20 years, with the last Assemblywoman for the district having been elected in 1995. She was also the first Democrat from Mount Laurel to ever serve in the State Legislature.

In 2020, she was one of the primary sponsors of Assembly Bill 4454 (now N.J.S.A. 18A:35-4.36a) which requires a diversity and inclusion to be included in the school curriculum for students in kindergarten through twelfth grade.

=== Committee assignments ===
Committee assignments for the current session are:

- Judiciary, Vice-Chair
- Budget
- Financial Institutions and Insurance

=== District 7 ===
Each of the 40 districts in the New Jersey Legislature has one representative in the New Jersey Senate and two members in the New Jersey General Assembly. The representatives from the 7th District for the 2024—2025 Legislative Session are:

- Senator Troy Singleton (D)
- Assemblyman Herb Conaway (D)
- Assemblywoman Carol A. Murphy (D)

== 2024 U.S. House of Representatives campaign ==
On October 11, 2023, Murphy announced that she was running for the Democratic nomination in New Jersey's 3rd congressional district in the 2024 election. She was running to succeed Andy Kim, who is vacating the seat to run for the United States Senate. Murphy was defeated by her district-mate, Herb Conaway, in the primary election in June.

== Electoral history ==
=== Assembly ===
7th Legislative District General Election, 2023
Party	Candidate	Votes	%
Democratic	Herbert C. Conaway Jr. (incumbent)	32,608	33.5
Democratic	Carol Murphy (incumbent)	31,936	32.8
Republican	Douglas Dillon	16,368	16.8
Republican	Eileen Bleistine	16,350	16.8
Total votes		97,262	100.0
Democratic hold			

New Jersey general election, 2021
Party	Candidate	Votes	%
Democratic	Herb Conaway	45,728	30.98%
Democratic	Carol Murphy	45,170	30.60
Republican	Douglas Dillon	28,579	19.36
Republican	Joseph Jesuele	28,139	19.06
Total votes		147,616	100.0

7th Legislative District General Election, 2019
Party	Candidate	Votes	%
Democratic	Carol Murphy (incumbent)	28,735	37.64%
Democratic	Herbert Conaway, Jr. (incumbent)	28,594	37.46%
Republican	Peter Miller	17,348	22.73%
True Blue Unbossed	Kathleen Cooley	1,656	2.17%
Total votes		76,333	100%
Democratic hold			

New Jersey general election, 2017
Party	Candidate	Votes	%	±%
Democratic	Herb Conaway	39,879	33.1	▲2.5
Democratic	Carol Murphy	38,819	32.3	▲2.4
Republican	Octavia Scott	20,941	17.4	▼1.9
Republican	Robert Thibault	20,726	17.2	▼1.7
Total votes		120,365	100.0	
