= Thomas P. Foy =

American politician (1951-2004)

Personal details
- Born: March 13, 1951 Camden, New Jersey, U.S.
- Died: September 1, 2004 (aged 53) Washington, D.C., U.S.
- Party: Democratic
- Children: 2
- Education: Duke University (BA, 1973); Rutgers School of Law–Camden (JD, 1977)
- Occupation: Attorney, politician
- Profession: Labor relations attorney

Member of the New Jersey General Assembly
- Constituency: 7th Legislative District

Member of the New Jersey Senate
- Constituency: 7th Legislative District
- Awards: Recognized for contributions to minimum wage legislation in New Jersey

Thomas P. Foy (March 13, 1951 – September 1, 2004) was an American attorney and Democratic Party politician who served in both houses of the New Jersey Legislature representing the 7th Legislative District, which covers portions of Burlington and Camden counties. He served in the General Assembly from 1984 to 1990, and was appointed to fill a vacancy in the New Jersey Senate, serving there from 1990 to 1992.

== Early life and education ==
Born in Camden, New Jersey, Foy graduated from Burlington Township High School. He was an honors graduate of Duke University, from which he graduated in 1973. Later, Foy attended Rutgers School of Law–Camden, graduating in 1977. Foy worked as an attorney specializing in labor relations. He had been general counsel to the New Jersey AFL-CIO in the 1980s, and was later employed as senior vice president of business development for Hill International, where he worked on issues relating to the firm's construction projects on the Tappan Zee Bridge and Interstate 287 in Westchester County, New York.

== Political career ==
His first elected office was to the Burlington Township Council, where his brother would later serve as mayor. He was elected to the General Assembly and served there until November 1990, when he was selected to fill a vacancy in the Senate left by Catherine A. Costa, who had left office to become Director of the New Jersey Division of Alcoholic Beverage Control; Foy served there from 1990 to 1992. In a party convention in January 1991, Jack Casey was chosen to fill the remaining portion of the term remaining in the General Assembly seat that had been vacated by Foy the previous month.

In the wake of voter frustration with tax increases enacted by Governor of New Jersey James Florio in 1990, Foy supported legislation that would allow voters to vote their state legislators out of office by referendum. Florio later recalled Foy's contributions in getting the minimum wage increased in the state, saying that "New Jersey was ahead of the nation in getting a minimum wage of $5.15 an hour, and Tom was vital in its effort". Foy was deputy political director for Florio's successful 1989 run for governor.

== Death ==
Foy died at age 53 of a heart attack he suffered at a Washington, D.C. train station on September 1, 2004, while returning to New Jersey from a meeting with diplomats from the Middle East. He was survived by his wife and two children.
