= Charles B. Yates =

American politician (1939–2000)

Member of the New Jersey Senate from the 7th district
- In office January 10, 1978 – January 12, 1982
- Preceded by: Edward J. Hughes Jr.
- Succeeded by: Herman T. Costello

Member of the New Jersey General Assembly
- In office January 11, 1972 – January 10, 1978 Serving with George H. Barbour and Herman T. Costello
- Preceded by: District created
- Succeeded by: Barbara Kalik
- Constituency: District 4B (1970–74); 7th district (1974–78)

Personal details
- Born: September 27, 1939 New York City, New York
- Died: October 6, 2000 (aged 61) Martha's Vineyard, Massachusetts, U.S.
- Party: Democratic

Charles B. Yates (September 27, 1939 – October 6, 2000) was an American banker, businessman, and Democratic Party politician who represented parts of Burlington County in the New Jersey General Assembly from 1972 to 1978 and in the New Jersey Senate from 1978 to 1982. He ran unsuccessfully for the United States House of Representatives in 1970 and 1974, losing both races to Edwin B. Forsythe.

While in the legislature, Yates was known as a reformist who led the state investigation into the Abscam scandal and called for stricter conflict-of-interest rules and campaign finance regulations. He died in a plane crash on Martha's Vineyard in 2000.

== Early life and education ==
Charles B. Yates was born in New York City. His parents were immigrants born in Canada and Czechoslovakia. He earned a bachelor's degree in chemical engineering from the City College of New York in 1960.

After retiring from business and politics, Yates earned a law degree from Vermont Law School in 1993.

== Business career ==
After graduating from City College, Yates lived in Luxembourg for six years establishing and managing a copper foil plant on behalf of his family company, Yates Industries. In 1967, he returned to the United States to serve as president of Yates Industries and lived in Willingboro Township, New Jersey.

In 1980, his business was acquired by Square D, an electrical products company from Palatine, Illinois. Yates served as vice chairman for two years and left to become a private investor and lawyer.

In 1992, while studying law, Yates became chairman of FMS Financial Corporation, a holding company which owned Farmers and Mechanics Bank in Burlington Township, New Jersey. In 1997, he reacquired his family's foil company and established it as Yates Foil USA in Bordentown.

== Political career ==
In 1969, Yates entered politics at the age of 30 by running for the New Jersey General Assembly. He lost the Democratic primary.

=== 1970 congressional campaign ===
In 1970, Yates ran for the vacant seat in New Jersey's 6th congressional district against state senator Edwin B. Forsythe. At the time, this district centered on the city of Burlington and included all of Burlington County and parts of neighboring Ocean and Camden counties. It had been left vacant by the resignation of William T. Cahill to serve as governor of New Jersey earlier that year. Yates ran his campaign out of his Willingboro home and his Bordentown office. Both candidates were opposed to American involvement in the Vietnam War. Although Yates said Forsythe, who had a reputation as a powerful opponent of organized crime and the Cosa Nostra in New Jersey, was "hard on crime and pollution and the like," he criticized his opponent for being "soft" on "hard issues." In October, Yates estimated that the campaign would cost him $50,000, primarily funded by his personal fortune. Forsythe won both the special election to complete Cahill's term and the regular election with approximately 55 percent of the vote.

=== New Jersey General Assembly ===
Yates represented his hometown of Edgewater Park in the New Jersey General Assembly from 1972 to 1978. In 1976, he advocated for the Assembly tax plan which created a graduated 1.5 to 2 percent income tax to fund New Jersey public schools, arguing that the proposal would cover an existing $378 million budget shortfall and permit the repeal of the unearned income tax, business gross receipts tax, and unincorporated business tax.

==== 1974 congressional campaign ====
In 1974, Yates again challenged Forsythe again in the 6th congressional district. The district had been changed in decennial redistricting to shore up Republican support for Forsythe, but Yates was encouraged by growing Democratic strength in Ocean County, Cherry Hill, and Willingboro. Since the 1970 campaign, the Republican administrations of both President Richard Nixon and Governor Cahill had been engulfed in scandals that resulted in a landslide victory for the Democratic Party in the 1973 New Jersey elections.

Yates ran an aggressive, liberal campaign against Forsythe, seeking to undermine his "nice guy" image in the district. Forsythe avoided head-to-head confrontation by remaining in Washington during the congressional session and campaigning only on weekends. Forsythe did not spend any money on television advertising, while Yates spent over $30,000 for spots on Philadelphia channels. Although the national mood was dominated by the Watergate scandal and pardon of Richard Nixon, both candidates focused on economic issues, particularly ongoing price inflation. Forsythe again defeated Yates with about 52 percent of the vote despite New Jersey Republicans losing four of their seven seats in the House.

=== New Jersey Senate ===
In 1977, Yates challenged incumbent state senator Edward J. Hughes Jr. of Cinnaminson in the Democratic primary. He defeated Hughes by 352 votes following a recount which Hughes requested. He served one term and chaired the Joint Legislative Committee on Ethical Standards and the Joint Committee on Appropriations. In 1979, he voted against a bill to regulate abortion which passed the Senate.

As chair of the ethics committee, Yates proposed amendments to the state code of ethics to prohibit senators from appearing before judge as an attorney where the judge was up for reappointment to the bench and would require the senator's vote.

In 1979, Yates led the investigation into Kenneth A. Gewertz of Woodbury, who shared ownership of a company that contracted to sell 250 slot machines to Resorts International Casino in Atlantic City. Yates criticized Gewertz for holding hearings on casino regulations during the investigation and called for tighter regulation of the state code of ethics. The committee ultimately advised Gewertz to sell his interest in the slot machine business, which he did. Gewertz then accused Steven P. Perskie of Atlantic City, a member of the committee, for engaging in the casino real estate business. Perskie was investigated and cleared of wrongdoing.

In 1980, Yates was at the center of the state investigation into the Abscam scandal, in which several of his Democratic colleagues were investigated by the Federal Bureau of Investigation for accepting bribes from sting operatives posting as wealthy Arabs seeking to own an Atlantic City casino. Yates called for special counsel to review the allegations and supported stricter conflict-of-interest rules for legislators seeking business in industries that they regulated, including barring legislators and their spouses from working for, representing, or holding an interest in a casino or applicants for a casino license. Yates had the support of the Republican minority in the Assembly for his special counsel proposal but was opposed by Assembly speaker Christopher Jackman and party chairman Richard J. Coffee, who admitted to meeting with the sting operatives but denied accepting bribes. Critics referred to the proposal as a potential "witch hunt."

Yates was also critical his colleague David Friedland of Jersey City, who had been indicted for accepting bribes to arrange a loan out of the Teamsters pension fund. However, he declined to hold a hearing on Friedland's conduct on the grounds that the indictment did not allege a connection with legislative duties. Friedland later faked his death and became a fugitive from the law, hiding in Maldives until his capture.

In April 1981, Yates announced that he would not run for re-election to the Senate, citing "increased responsibilities in private employment."

== Personal life and death ==
Yates married his first wife prior to entering politics, and they had five children.

Yates met his second wife, Anya, an environmental lawyer, while attending Vermont Law School in the early 1990s. They had two biological children, Elena and William, and one adopted son, Sergei. Anya was involved in environmental preservation efforts on Martha's Vineyard, where they maintained a second home in the exclusive Boldwater section of Edgartown. She was involved in the Great Pond Foundation, an organization promoting research and habitat preservation.

=== Death and legacy ===
Yates, his wife, and their children Elena and William died in a plane crash on October 6, 2000, in Martha's Vineyard, Massachusetts, when the twin propeller Mitsubishi MU-2B airplane Yates was piloting crashed into the Manuel F. Correllus State Forest, about one mile from Martha's Vineyard Airport. Shortly before the crash, Yates acknowledged a warning from air traffic control that he was flying too low, responding, "I am correcting." Yates and the controllers began to make small talk before the plane crashed into a wooded area near the end of the airfield. Conditions were overcast, with visibility of two miles under a 100-foot ceiling of fog. In 2003, the owner of the plane, Keith Corporation, later sued the air traffic controllers for failing to sufficiently warn Yates.

At the time of his death, Yates was a resident of Princeton, New Jersey. In addition to his children from his first marriage, adopted son Sergei, and seven grandchildren, he was survived by his brothers, Craig Yates and Roy and Steven O'Brien, and his sister Frances Yates.

Frances Yates established the Norman Williams Distinguished Lecture in Land Use Planning and the Law at Vermont Law School in honor of Charles and Anya Yates.
