= 2003 New Jersey Senate election =

2003 New Jersey Senate elections
- November 4, 2003

All 40 seats in the New Jersey State Senate 21 seats needed for a majority
- Turnout: 34% (▼15pp)
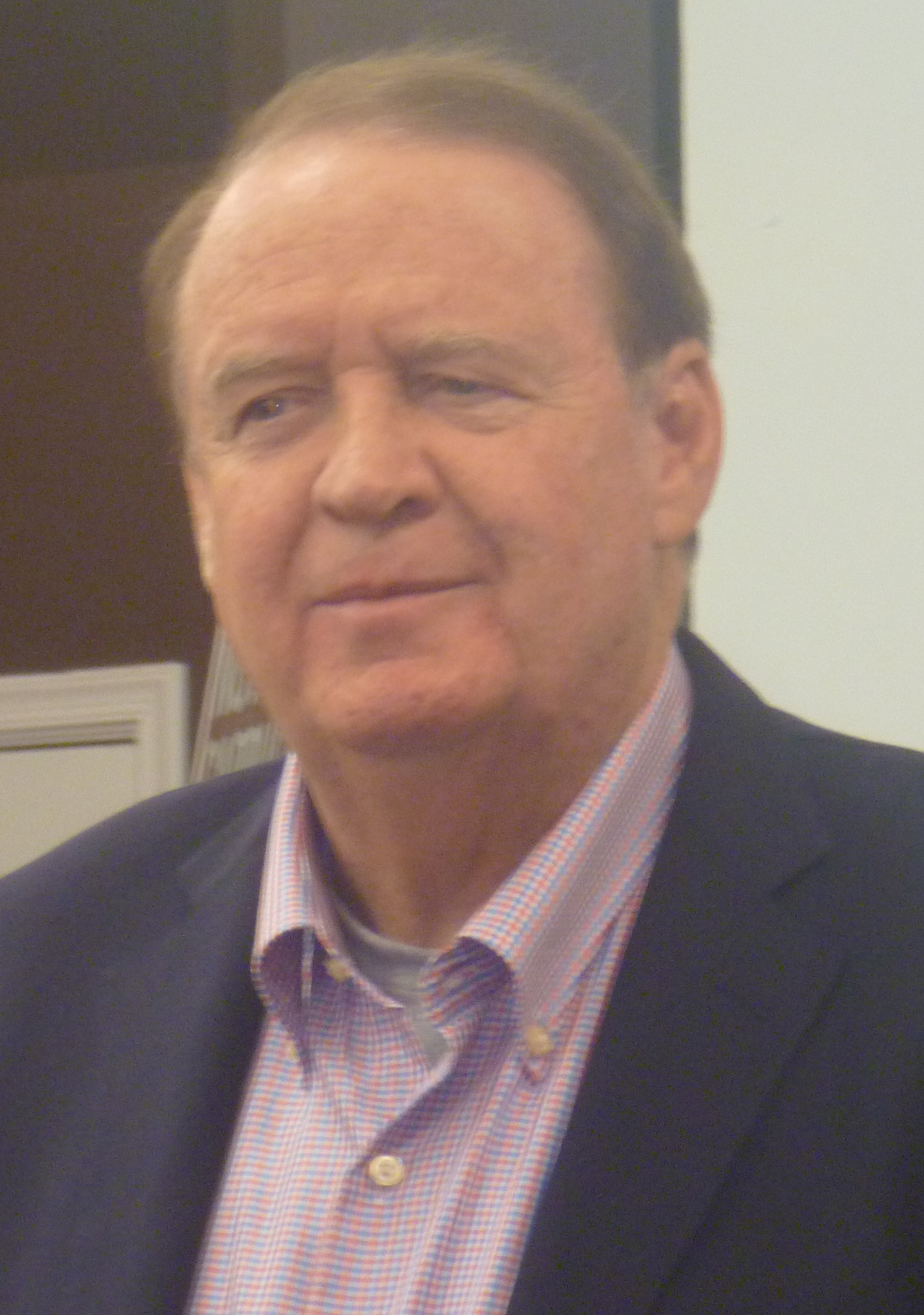

	Majority party	Minority party
Leader	Richard Codey	John O. Bennett (lost re-election)
Party	Democratic	Republican
Leader since	January 12, 1998	January 11, 1994
Leader's seat	27th (West Orange)	12th (Marlboro)
Last election	20	20
Seats won	22	18
Seat change	▲2	▼2
- Results by district Democratic hold Democratic gain Republican hold
Senate President before election
John O. Bennett and Richard Codey
Elected Senate President
Richard Codey
Democratic

The 2003 New Jersey Senate election was held on November 4.

The election took midway through Jim McGreevey's term as Governor of New Jersey. The election ended two years of split control in favor of the Democratic Party, which regained a majority for the first time since 1991. Incumbent Senate co-president John O. Bennett was unseated for re-election by Ellen Karcher in the 12th district, and Democrats also flipped a seat in the 4th.

The Democrats continue to hold the majority in the Senate as of 2026.

Contents
Incumbents not running • Summary of results
By District: 1 • 2 • 3 • 4 • 5 • 6 • 7 • 8 • 9 • 10 • 11 • 12 • 13 • 14 • 15 • 16 • 17 • 18 • 19 • 20 • 21 • 22 • 23 • 24 • 25 • 26 • 27 • 28 • 29 • 30 • 31 • 32 • 33 • 34 • 35 • 36 • 37 • 38 • 39 • 40

== Incumbents not running for re-election ==
=== Democratic ===
- Joseph Suliga (District 22) (withdrew to enter rehabilitation for alcoholism)

=== Republican ===
- James Cafiero (District 1)

Additionally, Senators John J. Matheussen, Richard Bagger, and Garry Furnari, who were elected in 2001, resigned before their terms were completed. The interim appointees for each of their seats ran as incumbents.

== Predictions ==
Source	Ranking	As of
The Cook; Political Report	Tossup	October 4, 2002

== Summary of results by State Senate district ==
District	Incumbent	Party	Elected Senator	Party
1st Legislative District	James Cafiero	Rep	Nicholas Asselta	Rep
2nd Legislative District	William Gormley	Rep	William Gormley	Rep
3rd Legislative District	Steve Sweeney	Dem	Steve Sweeney	Dem
4th Legislative District	George Geist (Note: Geist was appointed to the seat after Senator John Matheussen resigned to become head of the Delaware River Port Authority.)	Rep	Fred Madden	Dem
5th Legislative District	Wayne R. Bryant	Dem	Wayne R. Bryant	Dem
6th Legislative District	John Adler	Dem	John Adler	Dem
7th Legislative District	Diane Allen	Rep	Diane Allen	Rep
8th Legislative District	Martha W. Bark	Rep	Martha W. Bark	Rep
9th Legislative District	Leonard T. Connors	Rep	Leonard T. Connors	Rep
10th Legislative District	Andrew R. Ciesla	Rep	Andrew R. Ciesla	Rep
11th Legislative District	Joseph A. Palaia	Rep	Joseph A. Palaia	Rep
12th Legislative District	John O. Bennett	Rep	Ellen Karcher	Dem
13th Legislative District	Joe Kyrillos	Rep	Joe Kyrillos	Rep
14th Legislative District	Peter Inverso	Rep	Peter Inverso	Rep
15th Legislative District	Shirley Turner	Dem	Shirley Turner	Dem
16th Legislative District	Walter J. Kavanaugh	Rep	Walter J. Kavanaugh	Rep
17th Legislative District	Bob Smith	Dem	Bob Smith	Dem
18th Legislative District	Barbara Buono	Dem	Barbara Buono	Dem
19th Legislative District	Joe Vitale	Dem	Joe Vitale	Dem
20th Legislative District	Raymond Lesniak	Dem	Raymond Lesniak	Dem
21st Legislative District	Tom Kean Jr. (Note: Kean was appointed to complete the unexpired term of Senator Richard Bagger, who resigned to pursue private business interests.)	Rep	Tom Kean Jr.	Rep
22nd Legislative District	Joseph Suliga	Dem	Nicholas Scutari	Dem
23rd Legislative District	Leonard Lance	Rep	Leonard Lance	Rep
24th Legislative District	Robert Littell	Rep	Robert Littell	Rep
25th Legislative District	Anthony Bucco	Rep	Anthony Bucco	Rep
26th Legislative District	Robert Martin	Rep	Robert Martin	Rep
27th Legislative District	Richard Codey	Dem	Richard Codey	Dem
28th Legislative District	Ronald Rice	Dem	Ronald Rice	Dem
29th Legislative District	Sharpe James	Dem	Sharpe James	Dem
30th Legislative District	Robert W. Singer	Rep	Robert W. Singer	Rep
31st Legislative District	L. Harvey Smith (Note: Smith was appointed to the seat after the resignation of Senator Joseph Charles on August 13.)	Dem	Glenn Cunningham	Dem
32nd Legislative District	Nicholas Sacco	Dem	Nicholas Sacco	Dem
33rd Legislative District	Bernard Kenny	Dem	Bernard Kenny	Dem
34th Legislative District	Nia Gill	Dem	Nia Gill	Dem
35th Legislative District	John Girgenti	Dem	John Girgenti	Dem
36th Legislative District	Paul Sarlo (Note: Sarlo was appointed to the seat after Senator Garry Furnari resigned to join the New Jersey Superior Court.)	Dem	Paul Sarlo	Dem
37th Legislative District	Byron Baer	Dem	Byron Baer	Dem
38th Legislative District	Joseph Coniglio	Dem	Joseph Coniglio	Dem
39th Legislative District	Gerald Cardinale	Rep	Gerald Cardinale	Rep
40th Legislative District	Henry McNamara	Rep	Henry McNamara	Rep

=== Close races ===
1. District 4, 0.16% gain
2. District 3, 8.1%
3. District 36, 9.07%
4. District 12, 9.92% gain

== District 1 ==
New Jersey general election, 2003
Party	Candidate	Votes	%	±%
Republican	Nicholas Asselta	31,112	80.9%	▲30.5
HealthCare For All	Steven Fenichel	5,986	15.6%	N/A
English Language Only	George Cecola	1,341	3.5%	N/A
Total votes		38,439	100.0%	

== District 2 ==
New Jersey general election, 2003
Party	Candidate	Votes	%	±%
Republican	William Gormley (incumbent)	24,680	60.0%	▼26.5
Democratic	Tom Swift	15,281	37.1%	N/A
Green	Robert "Gabe" Gabrielsky	1,174	2.9%	▼10.6
Total votes		41,135	100.0%	

== District 3 ==
New Jersey general election, 2003
Party	Candidate	Votes	%	±%
Democratic	Stephen M. Sweeney (incumbent)	29,051	54.0%	▲2.5
Republican	Phillip S. Rhudy	24,698	46.0%	▼2.5
Total votes		53,749	100.0%	

== District 4 ==
New Jersey general election, 2003
Party	Candidate	Votes	%	±%
Democratic	Fred H. Madden	20,752	50.08%	▲8.3
Republican	George Geist (incumbent)	20,689	49.92%	▼8.3
Total votes		41,441	100.0%	

== District 5 ==
New Jersey general election, 2003
Party	Candidate	Votes	%	±%
Democratic	Wayne R. Bryant (incumbent)	21,442	64.9%	▼4.4
Republican	Ali Sloan El	11,589	35.1%	▲4.4
Total votes		33,031	100.0%	

== District 6 ==
New Jersey general election, 2003
Party	Candidate	Votes	%	±%
Democratic	John Adler (incumbent)	29,033	61.0%	▼5.7
Republican	Joseph A. Adolf	18,534	39.0%	▲5.7
Total votes		47,567	100.0%	

== District 7 ==
New Jersey general election, 2003
Party	Candidate	Votes	%	±%
Republican	Diane Allen (incumbent)	26,341	60.3	▲6.2
Democratic	Diane F. Gabriel	17,331	39.7	▼6.2
Total votes		'43,672'	'100.0'	

== District 8 ==
New Jersey general election, 2003
Party	Candidate	Votes	%	±%
Republican	Martha W. Bark (incumbent)	28,047	66.9%	▲6.2
Democratic	Thomas J. Price	13,865	33.1%	▼6.2
Total votes		'41,912'	'100.0'	

== District 9 ==
New Jersey general election, 2003
Party	Candidate	Votes	%	±%
Republican	Leonard T. Connors (incumbent)	36,539	65.6%	▲6.9
Democratic	Aviva Twersky-Glasner	18,995	34.4%	▼6.1
Total votes		'55,534'	'100.0'	

== District 10 ==
New Jersey general election, 2003
Party	Candidate	Votes	%	±%
Republican	Andrew R. Ciesla (incumbent)	29,752	65.1%	▲8.3
Democratic	James M. Blaney	15,960	34.9%	▼8.3
Total votes		'45,712'	'100.0'	

== District 11 ==
New Jersey general election, 2003
Party	Candidate	Votes	%	±%
Republican	Joseph A. Palaia	23,643	58.7%	▼3.3
Democratic	Paul X. Escandon	11,045	27.4%	▼10.6
Green	Brian Unger	4,759	11.8%	N/A
Libertarian	Emerson Ellett	831	2.1%	N/A
Total votes		'40,278'	'100.0'	

== District 12 ==
New Jersey general election, 2003
Party	Candidate	Votes	%	±%
Democratic	Ellen Karcher	24,174	52.4%	▲11.2
Republican	John O. Bennett (incumbent)	19,600	42.5%	▼16.3
Green	Earl Gray	2,334	5.1%	N/A
Total votes		46,108	100.0%	

== District 13 ==
New Jersey general election, 2003
Party	Candidate	Votes	%	±%
Republican	Joe Kyrillos (incumbent)	23,459	54.1%	▼10.3
Democratic	William E. Flynn	17,828	41.1%	▲5.5
Green	Greg Orr	1,419	3.3%	N/A
Conservative	Mac Dara Lyden	649	1.5%	N/A
Total votes		43,355	100.0%	

== District 14 ==
New Jersey general election, 2003
Party	Candidate	Votes	%	±%
Republican	Peter Inverso (incumbent)	29,499	58.6%	▲6.5
Democratic	Anthony J. "Skip" Cimino	19,613	38.9%	▼9.0
Libertarian	Ray Cragle	1,249	2.5%	N/A
Total votes		50,361	100.0%	

== District 15 ==
New Jersey general election, 2003
Party	Candidate	Votes	%	±%
Democratic	Shirley Turner (incumbent)	24,053	67.4%	▼1.7
Republican	Calvin O. Iszard	11,638	32.6%	▲2.9
Total votes		35,691	100.0%	

== District 16 ==
New Jersey general election, 2003
Party	Candidate	Votes	%	±%
Republican	Walter J. Kavanaugh (incumbent)	28,843	100.0%	▲33.4
Total votes		28,843	100.0%	

== District 17 ==
New Jersey general election, 2003
Party	Candidate	Votes	%	±%
Democratic	Bob Smith (incumbent)	17,438	61.0%	▼7.9
Republican	Jeffrey M. Orbach	11,168	39.0%	▲7.9
Total votes		28,606	100.0%	

== District 18 ==
New Jersey general election, 2003
Party	Candidate	Votes	%	±%
Democratic	Barbara Buono (incumbent)	18,561	58.5%	▼6.5
Republican	Richard F. Plechner	13,175	41.5%	▲6.5
Total votes		31,736	100.0%	

== District 19 ==
New Jersey general election, 2003
Party	Candidate	Votes	%	±%
Democratic	Joe Vitale (incumbent)	22,643	65.5%	▼11.9
Republican	Paul Danielczyk	11,949	34.5%	▲11.9
Total votes		34,592	100.0%	

== District 20 ==
New Jersey general election, 2003
Party	Candidate	Votes	%	±%
Democratic	Raymond Lesniak (incumbent)	12,361	62.2%	▼17.8
Republican	Daniel M. Nozza	7,217	36.3%	▲16.3
Restore NJ State	Shawn P. Gianella	298	1.5%	N/A
Total votes		19,876	100.0%	

== District 21 ==
New Jersey general election, 2003
Party	Candidate	Votes	%	±%
Republican	Tom Kean Jr. (incumbent)	32,058	67.4%	▲8.8
Democratic	Francis D. McIntyre	14,470	30.4%	▼11.0
Green	Teresa Migliore-DiMatteo	1,055	2.2%	N/A
Total votes		47,583	100.0%	

== District 22 ==
New Jersey general election, 2003
Party	Candidate	Votes	%	±%
Democratic	Nicholas Scutari	16,658	55.0%	▼4.1
Republican	Martin Marks	13,609	45.0%	▲4.1
Total votes		30,267	100.0%	

== District 23 ==
New Jersey general election, 2003
Party	Candidate	Votes	%	±%
Republican	Leonard Lance (incumbent)	29,775	68.0%	▼1.3
Democratic	Frederick P. Cook	13,994	32.0%	▲1.3
Total votes		43,769	100.0%	

== District 24 ==
New Jersey general election, 2003
Party	Candidate	Votes	%	±%
Republican	Robert E. Littell (incumbent)	23,106	68.1%	▼6.3
Democratic	James D. Morrison	10,810	31.9%	▲6.3
Total votes		33,916	100.0%	

== District 25 ==
New Jersey general election, 2003
Party	Candidate	Votes	%	±%
Republican	Anthony R. Bucco (incumbent)	22,163	55.1%	▼10.4
Democratic	Blair B. MacInnes	18,060	44.9%	▲10.4
Total votes		40,223	100.0%	

== District 26 ==
New Jersey general election, 2003
Party	Candidate	Votes	%	±%
Republican	Robert J. Martin (incumbent)	21,733	66.0	▲0.1
Democratic	Daniel L. Grant	11,216	34.0	▼0.1
Total votes		'32,949'	'100.0'	

== District 27 ==
New Jersey general election, 2003
Party	Candidate	Votes	%	±%
Democratic	Richard Codey (incumbent)	17,220	65.8%	▲1.1
Republican	Bobbi Joan Bennett	8,958	34.2%	▲1.4
Total votes		26,178	100.0%	

== District 28 ==
New Jersey general election, 2003
Party	Candidate	Votes	%	±%
Democratic	Ronald Rice (incumbent)	10,068	73.4%	▲4.0
Republican	Jean LaMothe	3,137	22.9%	▼6.7
Green	Beresford Jones	518	3.8%	N/A
Total votes		13,723	100.0%	

== District 29 ==
New Jersey general election, 2003
Party	Candidate	Votes	%	±%
Democratic	Sharpe James (incumbent)	7,919	82.7%	▼17.3
Green	Toy-Ling Washington	1,187	12.4%	N/A
Socialist Workers	Abigail D. Tilsner	470	4.9%	N/A
Total votes		9,576	100.0%	

== District 30 ==
New Jersey general election, 2003
Party	Candidate	Votes	%	±%
Republican	Robert W. Singer (incumbent)	24,637	62.6%	▲0.9
Democratic	Steven Morlino	14,713	37.4%	▼0.9
Total votes		39,350	100.0	

== District 31 ==
New Jersey general election, 2003
Party	Candidate	Votes	%	±%
Democratic	Glenn Cunningham	15,838	79.0%	▲4.9
Republican	Carmen E. Mendiola	3,214	16.0%	▼9.9
Green	Eric Olsen	1,005	5.0%	N/A
Total votes		20,057	100.0%	

== District 32 ==
New Jersey general election, 2003
Party	Candidate	Votes	%	±%
Democratic	Nicholas Sacco (incumbent)	17,269	76.9%	▲7.9
Republican	Louis S. Lusquinos Jr	4,085	18.2%	▼11.2
Time For Change	Denis Jaslow	928	4.1%	N/A
Eliminate Primary Elections	Louis Vernotico	160	0.7%	▲0.2
Total votes		22,442	100.0%	

== District 33 ==
New Jersey general election, 2003
Party	Candidate	Votes	%	±%
Democratic	Bernard Kenny (incumbent)	20,809	80.9%	▲5.6
Republican	Rafael Fraguela	4,904	19.1%	▼5.6
Total votes		25,713	100.0%	

== District 34 ==
New Jersey general election, 2003
Party	Candidate	Votes	%	±%
Democratic	Nia Gill (incumbent)	19,161	69.7%	▲4.8
Republican	Frank C. Fusco	8,325	30.3%	▼4.1
Total votes		27,486	100.0%	

== District 35 ==
New Jersey general election, 2003
Party	Candidate	Votes	%	±%
Democratic	John Girgenti (incumbent)	16,243	68.6%	▼31.4
Republican	David R. Troast	7,434	31.4%	N/A
Total votes		23,677	100.0%	

== District 36 ==
New Jersey general election, 2003
Party	Candidate	Votes	%	±%
Democratic	Paul Sarlo (incumbent)	18,035	53.3%	▲2.5
Republican	John V. Kelly	14,964	44.2%	▼3.6
Tax the Rich	Richard DelaRosa	496	1.5%	N/A
Real Pro-Choice	Maximo Moscoso	348	1.0%	N/A
Total votes		33,843	100.0%	

== District 37 ==
New Jersey general election, 2003
Party	Candidate	Votes	%	±%
Democratic	Byron Baer (incumbent)	22,543	61.9%	▼4.5
Republican	Barry S. Honig	13,860	38.1%	▲4.5
Total votes		36,403	100.0%	

== District 38 ==
New Jersey general election, 2003
Party	Candidate	Votes	%	±%
Democratic	Joseph Coniglio (incumbent)	23,077	55.7%	▲2.5
Republican	Rose Marie Heck	18,321	44.3%	▼2.5
Total votes		41,398	100.0%	

== District 39 ==
New Jersey general election, 2003
Party	Candidate	Votes	%	±%
Republican	Gerald Cardinale (incumbent)	30,718	62.3%	▼0.6
Democratic	Richard Muti	18,605	37.7%	▲1.5
Total votes		49,323	100.0%	

== District 40 ==
New Jersey general election, 2003
Party	Candidate	Votes	%	±%
Republican	Henry McNamara (incumbent)	24,478	64.5%	▲2.2
Democratic	Matt Rogers	13,493	35.5%	▼2.2
Total votes		37,971	100.0%	

== See also ==
- 2003 New Jersey General Assembly election
