= Franklin Township, Gloucester County, New Jersey =

Township in Gloucester County, New Jersey, US

Franklin Township, New Jersey
- Township
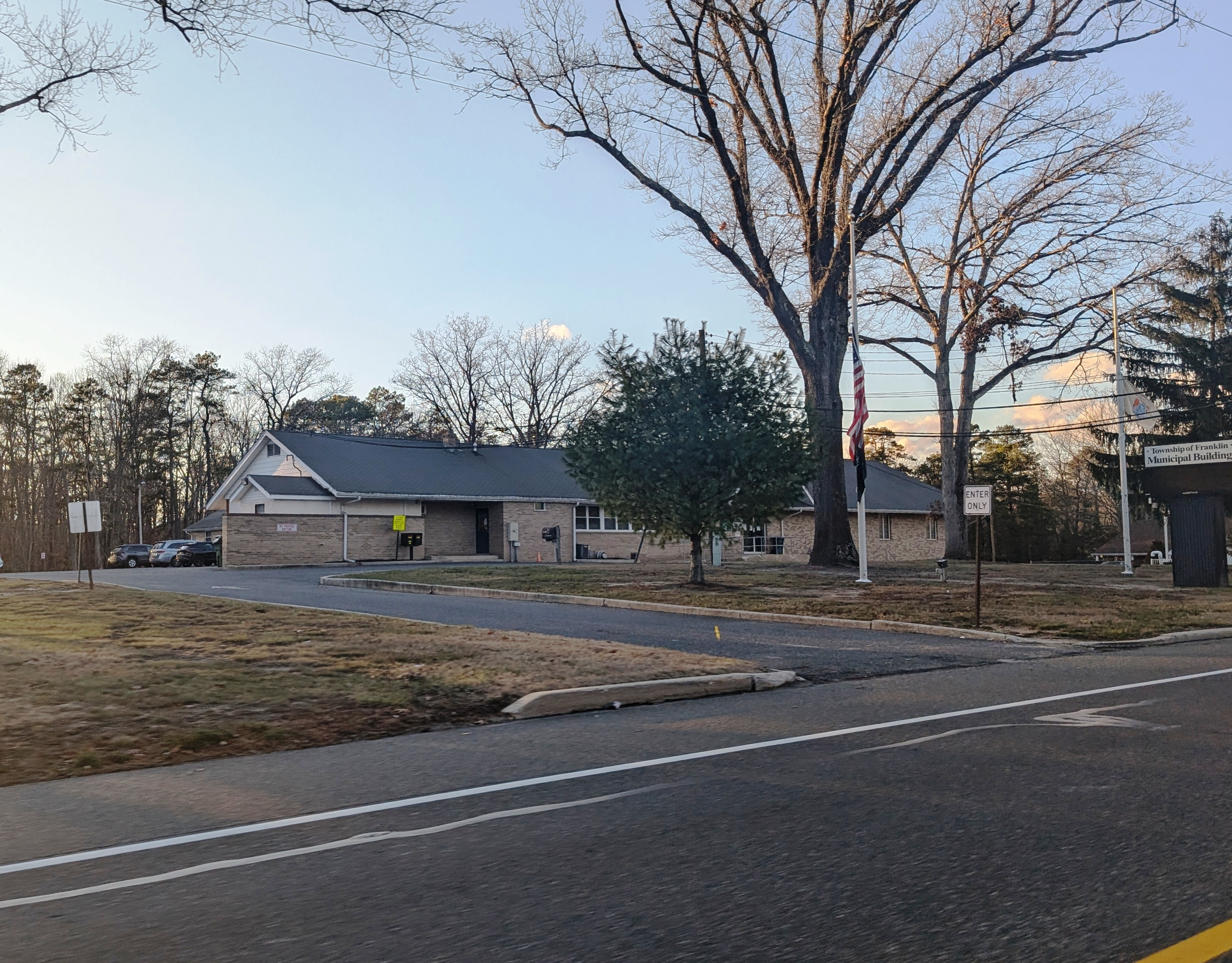
- Municipal Building

- coat of arms

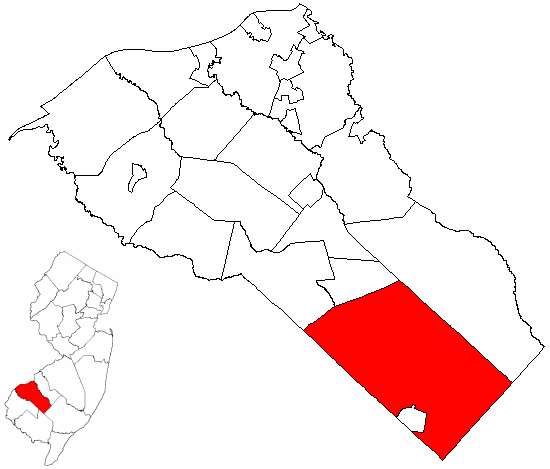
- Location of Franklin Township in Gloucester County highlighted in red (right). Inset map: Location of Gloucester County in New Jersey highlighted in red (left).

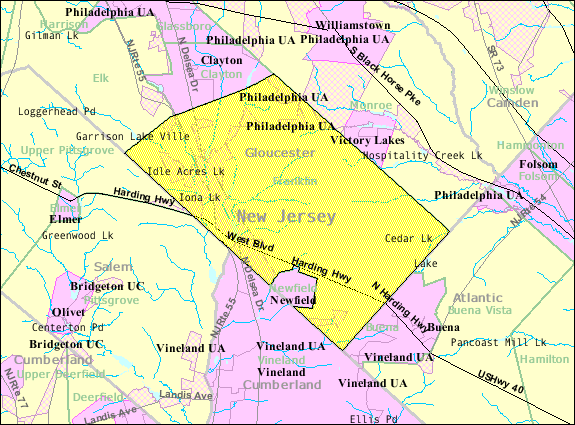
- Census Bureau map of Franklin Township, Gloucester County, New Jersey

- Location in Gloucester County Location in New Jersey Location in the United States
- Coordinates: 39.59884°N 75.020874°W
- Country: United States
- State: New Jersey
- County: Gloucester
- Incorporated: January 27, 1820
- Named for: Benjamin Franklin

Government
  - Type: Township
  - Body: Township Committee
  - Mayor: John "Jake" Bruno (R, term ends December 31, 2025)
  - Administrator: Matthew Finley
  - Municipal clerk: Barbara Freijomil

Area
  - Total: 56.39 sq mi (146.04 km^{2})
  - Land: 55.83 sq mi (144.60 km^{2})
  - Water: 0.56 sq mi (1.44 km^{2}) 0.99%
  - Rank: 26th of 565 in state 1st of 24 in county
- Elevation: 105 ft (32 m)

Population (2020)
  - Total: 16,380
  - Estimate (2023): 16,543
  - Rank: 162nd of 565 in state 6th of 24 in county
  - Density: 293.4/sq mi (113.3/km^{2})
  - Rank: 475th of 565 in state 21st of 24 in county
- Time zone: UTC−05:00 (Eastern (EST))
  - Summer (DST): UTC−04:00 (Eastern (EDT))
- ZIP Code: 08322 – Franklinville 08328 - Malaga
- Area code: 856
- FIPS code: 3401524840
- GNIS feature ID: 0882138
- Website: www.franklintownshipnj.org

Franklin Township is a township in Gloucester County, in the U.S. state of New Jersey. As of the 2020 United States census, the township's population was 16,380, a decrease of 440 (−2.6%) from the 2010 census count of 16,820, which in turn reflected an increase of 1,354 (+8.8%) from the 15,466 counted in the 2000 census.

Franklin Township was formed as a township by an act of the New Jersey Legislature on January 27, 1820, from portions of Greenwich Township and Woolwich Township. Parts of the township have been taken to form Clayton Township (February 5, 1858) and Newfield (March 8, 1924). The township was named for Benjamin Franklin.

== Geography ==
According to the U.S. Census Bureau, the township had a total area of 56.39 square miles (146.04 km^{2}), including 55.83 square miles (144.60 km^{2}) of land and 0.56 square miles (1.44 km^{2}) of water (0.99%). Unincorporated communities, localities and place names located partially or completely within the township include Blue Bell, Downstown, Forest Grove. Franklinville, Fries Mills, Iona, Janvier, Lake, Malaga, Marsh Lake, Piney Hollow, Plainville, Star Cross, and Porchtown.

The township borders the municipalities of Clayton, Elk Township, Monroe Township, and Newfield in Gloucester County; Buena and Buena Vista Township in Atlantic County; Vineland in Cumberland County; and Pittsgrove Township and Upper Pittsgrove Township in Salem County.

== Demographics ==
Historical population
Census	Pop.	Note	%±
1820	1,137		—
1830	1,574		38.4%
1840	2,077		32.0%
1850	2,984		43.7%
1860	1,778	*	−40.4%
1870	2,188		23.1%
1880	2,480		13.3%
1890	2,021		−18.5%
1900	2,252		11.4%
1910	2,603		15.6%
1920	3,448		32.5%
1930	3,563	*	3.3%
1940	3,464		−2.8%
1950	5,056		46.0%
1960	7,451		47.4%
1970	8,990		20.7%
1980	12,396		37.9%
1990	14,482		16.8%
2000	15,466		6.8%
2010	16,820		8.8%
2020	16,380		−2.6%
2023 (est.)	16,543		1.0%
Population sources: 1820–2000; 1820–1920 1840 1850–1870; 1850 1870 1880–1890; 1890–1910 1910–1930; 1940–2000 2000; 2010 2020 * = Lost territory in previous decade.

=== 2010 census ===
The 2010 United States census counted 16,820 people, 5,849 households, and 4,562 families in the township. The population density was 300.9 inhabitants per square mile (116.2/km^{2}). There were 6,104 housing units at an average density of 109.2 per square mile (42.2/km^{2}). The racial makeup was 88.44% (14,876) White, 7.18% (1,208) Black or African American, 0.20% (34) Native American, 1.27% (213) Asian, 0.03% (5) Pacific Islander, 1.03% (174) from other races, and 1.84% (310) from two or more races. Hispanic or Latino of any race were 4.49% (755) of the population.

Of the 5,849 households, 33.6% had children under the age of 18; 61.5% were married couples living together; 10.9% had a female householder with no husband present and 22.0% were non-families. Of all households, 16.9% were made up of individuals and 6.2% had someone living alone who was 65 years of age or older. The average household size was 2.87 and the average family size was 3.23.

24.0% of the population were under the age of 18, 9.0% from 18 to 24, 25.1% from 25 to 44, 31.4% from 45 to 64, and 10.5% who were 65 years of age or older. The median age was 40.0 years. For every 100 females, the population had 100.5 males. For every 100 females ages 18 and older there were 97.5 males.

The Census Bureau's 2006–2010 American Community Survey showed that, in 2010 inflation-adjusted dollars, median household income was $74,327 with a margin of error of +/− $6,247, and median family income was $80,667 (+/− $7,344). Males had a median income of $51,425 (+/− $3,105) versus $42,297 (+/− $2,605) for females. The per capita income for Franklin Township was $32,141 (+/− $3,019). About 4.7% of families and 7.0% of the population were below the poverty line, including 6.9% of those under age 18 and 15.2% of those age 65 or over.

=== 2000 census ===
As of the 2000 U.S. census there were 15,466 people, 5,225 households, and 4,190 families residing in the township. The population density was 276.1 inhabitants per square mile (106.6/km^{2}). There were 5,461 housing units at an average density of 97.5 per square mile (37.6/km^{2}). The racial makeup of the township was 90.22% White, 6.66% African American, 0.31% Native American, 0.41% Asian, 0.01% Pacific Islander, 1.25% from other races, and 1.14% from two or more races. Hispanic or Latino of any race were 3.51% of the population.

There were 5,225 households, out of which 40.4% had children under the age of 18 living with them, 63.9% were married couples living together, 11.2% had a female householder with no husband present, and 19.8% were non-families. 15.9% of all households were made up of individuals, and 5.4% had someone living alone who was 65 years of age or older. The average household size was 2.94 and the average family size was 3.29.

In the township, the population was spread out, with 27.7% under the age of 18, 8.5% from 18 to 24, 30.8% from 25 to 44, 23.5% from 45 to 64, and 9.6% who were 65 years of age or older. The median age was 36 years. For every 100 females, there were 99.7 males. For every 100 females age 18 and over, there were 97.7 males.

The median income for a household in the township was $55,169, and the median income for a family was $60,518. Males had a median income of $41,159 versus $27,538 for females. The per capita income for the township was $20,277. About 3.5% of families and 5.1% of the population were below the poverty line, including 3.8% of those under age 18 and 6.4% of those age 65 or over.

== Government ==
=== Local government ===
Franklin Township is governed under the Township form of New Jersey municipal government, one of 141 municipalities (of the 564) statewide that use this form, the second-most commonly used form of government in the state. The Township Committee is comprised of five members, who are elected directly by the voters at-large in partisan elections to serve three-year terms of office on a staggered basis, with either one or two seats coming up for election each year as part of the November general election in a three-year cycle. At an annual reorganization meeting, the Township Committee selects one of its members to serve as Mayor and another as Deputy Mayor.

As of 2025, the Franklin Township Committee is comprised of Mayor John "Jake" Bruno (R, term on committee ends December 31, 2027; term as mayor ends 2025), Deputy Mayor Tim Doyle (R, term on committee ends 2026; term as deputy mayor ends 2025), Mark Fiorella (R, 2026), Jonathan Keen (R, 2025) and Mike Marsh (R, 2025).

In January 2020, Timothy Doyle was chosen from three candidates nominated by the Republican municipal committee to fill the seat expiring in December 2020 that had been held by Leah Vasallo until she resigned from office the previous month.

Republican Heather Flaim was appointed to fill the seat expiring in December 2018 that became vacant following the death of Ed Leopardi in September 2016; a judge ruled in May 2017 that Flaim could take the seat in a ruling in a case in which the local Democratic municipal committee claimed that it had submitted a list of three candidates to succeed Leopardi, which the township claims it never received. Flaim won a full three-year term in the November 2017 general election, while Democrat Charles F. Pluta was elected to serve the balance of Leopardi's term of office.

=== Federal, state and county representation ===
Franklin Township is located in the 2nd Congressional District and is part of New Jersey's 4th state legislative district.

For the 119th United States Congress, New Jersey's 2nd congressional district is represented by Jeff Van Drew (R, Dennis Township). New Jersey is represented in the United States Senate by Democrats Cory Booker (Newark, term ends 2027) and Andy Kim (Moorestown, term ends 2031).

For the 2026–2027 session, the 4th legislative district of the New Jersey Legislature is represented in the State Senate by Paul D. Moriarty (D, Washington Township) and in the General Assembly by Dan Hutchison (D, Gloucester Township) and Cody Miller (D, Monroe Township).

Gloucester County is governed by a board of county commissioners, whose seven members are elected at-large to three-year terms of office on a staggered basis in partisan elections, with either two or three seats coming up for election each year. At a reorganization meeting held each January, the Board selects a Director and a Deputy Director from among its members. As of 2025, Gloucester County's Commissioners are:

Director Frank J. DiMarco (D, Deptford Township, 2025), Matt Weng (D, Pitman, 2026), Joann Gattinelli (D, Washington Township, 2026), Nicholas DeSilvio (R, Franklin Township, 2027), Denice DiCarlo (D, West Deptford Township, 2025) Deputy Director Jim Jefferson (D, Woodbury, 2026) and Christopher Konawel Jr. (R, Glassboro, 2027).

Gloucester County's constitutional officers are: Clerk James N. Hogan (D, Franklin Township; 2027), Sheriff Carmel Morina (D, Greenwich Township; 2027) and Surrogate Giuseppe "Joe" Chila (D, Woolwich Township; 2028).

=== Politics ===
United States presidential election results for Franklin Township 2024 2020 2016 2012 2008 2004
Year	Republican		Democratic		Third party(ies)	
Year	No.	%	No.	%	No.	%
2024	5,988	64.17%	3,202	34.32%	141	1.51%
2020	5,947	61.06%	3,644	37.41%	149	1.53%
2016	4,631	58.86%	2,946	37.44%	291	3.70%
2012	3,553	47.78%	3,782	50.86%	101	1.36%
2008	3,646	46.49%	4,065	51.84%	131	1.67%
2004	3,503	49.77%	3,443	48.92%	92	1.31%

As of March 2011, there were a total of 10,760 registered voters in Franklin, of which 2,885 (26.8%) were registered as Democrats, 2,422 (22.5%) were registered as Republicans and 5,444 (50.6%) were registered as Unaffiliated. There were 9 voters registered as Libertarians or Greens.

Gubernatorial election results for Franklin Township
Year	Republican		Democratic		Third party(ies)	
Year	No.	%	No.	%	No.	%
2025	4,497	62.11%	2,700	37.29%	43	0.59%
2021	3,983	67.47%	1,882	31.88%	38	0.64%
2017	2,267	50.75%	2,072	46.38%	128	2.87%
2013	1,138	62.22%	677	37.01%	14	0.77%
2009	2,445	49.95%	1,998	40.82%	452	9.23%
2005	1,937	44.28%	2,203	50.37%	234	5.35%

In the 2020 presidential election, Republican Donald Trump received 61.0% of the vote (5,947 cast), ahead of Democrat Joe Biden with 37.4% (3,644 votes), and other candidates with 1.2% (149 votes) among the 9,740 ballots cast by the township's 12,573 registered voters, for a turnout of 77.4%. In the 2016 presidential election, Republican Donald Trump received 58.8% of the vote (4,631 cast), ahead of Democrat Hillary Clinton with 37.4% (2,646 votes), and other candidates with 3.8% (591 votes) among the 7,868 ballots cast by the township's 11,750 registered voters, for a turnout of 67.0%. In the 2012 presidential election, Democrat Barack Obama received 50.9% of the vote (3,782 cast), ahead of Republican Mitt Romney with 47.8% (3,553 votes), and other candidates with 1.4% (101 votes), among the 7,492 ballots cast by the township's 11,180 registered voters (56 ballots were spoiled), for a turnout of 67.0%. In the 2008 presidential election, Democrat Barack Obama received 51.3% of the vote (4,065 cast), ahead of Republican John McCain with 46.0% (3,646 votes) and other candidates with 1.7% (131 votes), among the 7,923 ballots cast by the township's 11,085 registered voters, for a turnout of 71.5%. In the 2004 presidential election, Republican George W. Bush received 49.5% of the vote (3,503 ballots cast), outpolling Democrat John Kerry with 48.7% (3,443 votes) and other candidates with 0.9% (92 votes), among the 7,073 ballots cast by the township's 9,870 registered voters, for a turnout percentage of 71.7.

In the 2013 gubernatorial election, Republican Chris Christie received 62.2% of the vote (1,138 cast), ahead of Democrat Barbara Buono with 37.0% (677 votes), and other candidates with 0.8% (14 votes), among the 1,915 ballots cast by the township's 3,654 registered voters (86 ballots were spoiled), for a turnout of 52.4%. In the 2009 gubernatorial election, Republican Chris Christie received 49.2% of the vote (2,445 ballots cast), ahead of Democrat Jon Corzine with 40.2% (1,998 votes), Independent Chris Daggett with 8.4% (417 votes) and other candidates with 0.7% (35 votes), among the 4,969 ballots cast by the township's 11,042 registered voters, yielding a 45.0% turnout.

United States Senate election results for Franklin Township1
Year	Republican		Democratic		Third party(ies)	
Year	No.	%	No.	%	No.	%
2024	5,611	62.20%	3,299	36.57%	111	1.23%
2018	3,509	58.90%	2,243	37.65%	206	3.46%
2012	3,221	45.07%	3,719	52.04%	206	2.88%
2006	2,141	46.05%	2,338	50.29%	170	3.66%

United States Senate election results for Franklin Township2
Year	Republican		Democratic		Third party(ies)	
Year	No.	%	No.	%	No.	%
2020	5,674	59.41%	3,628	37.99%	248	2.60%
2014	1,937	50.10%	1,825	47.21%	104	2.69%
2013	1,332	54.86%	1,062	43.74%	34	1.40%
2008	3,298	44.71%	3,860	52.33%	218	2.96%

== Public safety ==
Franklin Township is served by the Franklin Township Police Department, along with five volunteer fire companies and the County-run Emergency Medical Services. Serving are Forest Grove Volunteer Fire Company (founded 1949), Franklinville Volunteer Fire Company, Janvier Volunteer Fire Company (founded 1946), Malaga Volunteer Fire Company, Star Cross Volunteer Fire Company. Since 2017, Gloucester County EMS provides emergency medical services for the whole township, after the governing body questioned the ability of the Township of Franklin Ambulance Corps to respond to calls with volunteers.

== Education ==
Franklin Township Public Schools serve students in pre-kindergarten through sixth grade. As of the 2022–23 school year, the district, comprised of three schools, had an enrollment of 1,338 students and 116.2 classroom teachers (on an FTE basis), for a student–teacher ratio of 11.5:1. Schools in the district (with 2022–23 enrollment data from the National Center for Education Statistics) are Mary F. Janvier Elementary School with 555 students in grades K-2, Main Road School with 392 students in grades 3-4 and Caroline L. Reutter School with 379 students in grades 5-6. Students from Newfield attend the Franklin Township district's schools as part of a sending/receiving relationship in which Newfield accounts for about 100 of the nearly 1,400 students in the district.

For seventh through twelfth grades, students attend the Delsea Regional School District, which serves students from both Elk Township and Franklin Township. Students from Newfield attend the district's schools as part of a sending/receiving relationship begun in September 2010 after Newfield ended its prior relationship with the Buena Regional School District. Schools in the district (with 2022–23 enrollment data from the National Center for Education Statistics) are Delsea Regional Middle School with 518 students in grades 7-8 and Delsea Regional High School with 1,074 students in grades 9-12. The seats on the high school district's nine-member board of education are allocated to the constituent municipalities based on population, with seven seats assigned to Franklin Township.

The New Jersey Department of Education considered a vote by the Franklin Township Board of Education in June 2010 requesting that the district withdraw from the Delsea Regional School District, which would require that the Delsea region be dissolved as about 80% of the regional district's students come from Franklin. With the withdrawal of Franklin Township, two options being considered were to either have Franklin and Elk Townships create a new regional district with Newfield students attending on a send-receive basis, or having Franklin Township establish its own Pre-K–12 district which would receive students from both Elk Township and Newfield.

Students from across the county are eligible to apply to attend Gloucester County Institute of Technology, a four-year high school in Deptford Township that provides technical and vocational education. As a public school, students do not pay tuition to attend the school.

The Roman Catholic Diocese of Camden operates St. Michael the Archangel Regional School in Clayton; Nativity Church in Franklinville is one of the sending parishes. Our Lady of Mercy Academy is a college preparatory, all-girls Catholic high school founded in 1962 by the Daughters of Our Lady of Mercy.

== Transportation ==
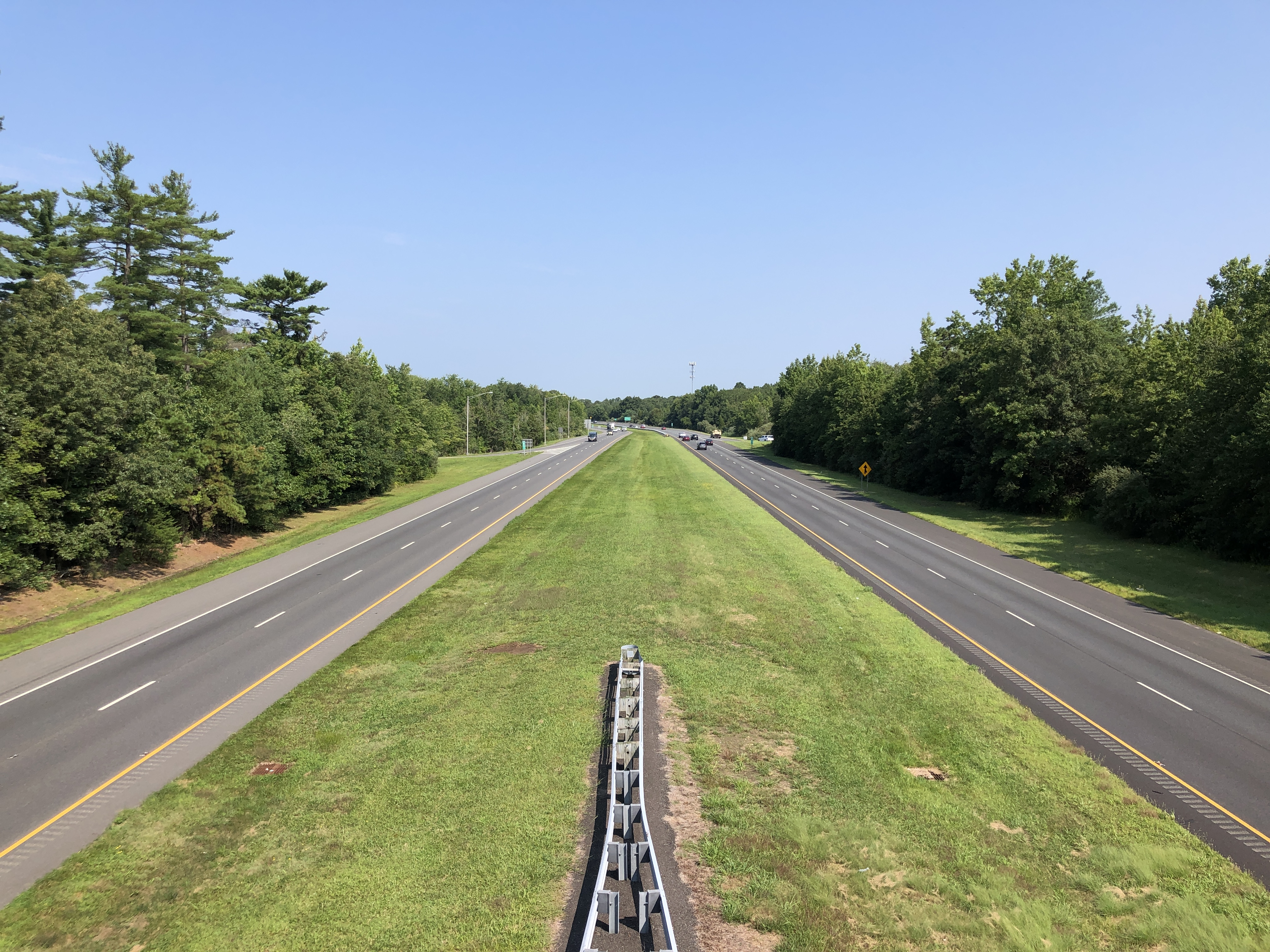
Route 55 northbound in Franklin Township

=== Roads and highways ===
As of May 2010, the township had a total of 177.39 miles (285.48 km) of roadways, of which 118.84 miles (191.25 km) were maintained by the municipality, 39.04 miles (62.83 km) by Gloucester County and 19.51 miles (31.40 km) by the New Jersey Department of Transportation.

U.S. Route 40 passes through the southern area while both Route 47 and the Route 55 pass through the western part of the township.

The county roads that pass through Franklin Township include CR 538, CR 555, and CR 557.

=== Public transportation ===
NJ Transit provides bus service in the township on service between Cape May and Philadelphia on the 313 and between Millville and Philadelphia on the 408 route.

== Notable people ==
People who were born in, residents of, or otherwise closely associated with Franklin Township include:

- James Broselow (1943–2025), emergency physician, inventor and entrepreneur, best known for inventing the Broselow tape
- Domenick DiCicco (1963–2024), politician who served in the New Jersey General Assembly from 2010 to 2012, where he represented the 4th Legislative District
- H. Jay Dinshah (1933–2000), founder and president of the American Vegan Society and editor of its publication, Ahimsa magazine
- Leonard H. Kaser (born 1931), lawyer and politician who represented the 3rd legislative district in the New Jersey General Assembly from 1968 to 1969
- Ed Keegan (1939–2014), MLB pitcher who played for the Philadelphia Phillies and Kansas City Athletics
- Eliot Marshall (born 1980), retired mixed martial artist

== Wineries ==
- Coda Rossa Winery located in the Franklinville section of the township.
