= 2024 United States presidential election in New Jersey =

- November 5, 2024
- Turnout: ▼64.67% (of registered voters)

Nominee	Kamala Harris	Donald Trump
Party	Democratic	Republican
Home state	California	Florida
Running mate	Tim Walz	JD Vance
Electoral vote	14	0
Popular vote	2,220,713	1,968,215
Percentage	51.97%	46.06%

Harris
40–50%
50–60%
60–70%
70–80%
80–90%
90–100%
Trump
40–50%
50–60%
60–70%
70–80%
80–90%
Tie
50%
President before election
Joe Biden
Democratic
Elected President
Donald Trump
Republican

The 2024 United States presidential election in New Jersey took place on Tuesday, November 5, 2024, as part of the 2024 United States elections in which all 50 states plus the District of Columbia participated. New Jersey voters chose electors to represent them in the Electoral College via a popular vote. The state of New Jersey has 14 electoral votes in the Electoral College, following reapportionment due to the 2020 United States census in which the state neither gained nor lost a seat.

New Jersey has backed the Democratic candidate in every presidential election since 1992. Kamala Harris was widely expected to win the state, which she did by a 5.91% margin, marking the first single-digit margin of victory for a Democrat in the state since 2004. This is the closest a Republican has come to winning in New Jersey since 1992.

While Trump gained nearly 100,000 votes from 2020, Harris received nearly 400,000 fewer votes than Biden. Trump received the most votes in New Jersey of any Republican presidential nominee, surpassing Ronald Reagan's 1984 raw vote total.

New Jersey had the second-largest swing to the right from the 2020 election after neighboring New York. New Jersey joined most other blue and blue-leaning states such as New York and California in seeing significant rightward shifts in 2024. New Jersey was also the only state that voted for Hillary Clinton in 2016 and Joe Biden in 2020 by double digits that Harris won by a single digit margin in 2024.

== Primary elections ==
=== Democratic primary ===
The New Jersey Democratic primary was held on June 4, 2024, alongside primaries in the District of Columbia, Montana, New Mexico, and South Dakota.

New Jersey Democratic primary, June 4, 2024
Candidate	Votes	%	Delegates
Joe Biden (incumbent)	458,281	88.01	124
Uncommitted	46,988	9.02	2
Terrisa Bukovinac	14,179	2.72	0
Write-in votes	(Note: The exact final amount was not published.)1,269	0.24	—
Total	520,717	100%	126

=== Republican primary ===
The New Jersey Republican primary was held on June 4, 2024, alongside primaries in the District of Columbia, Montana, New Mexico, and South Dakota.

New Jersey Republican primary, June 4, 2024
Candidate	Votes	Percentage	Actual delegate count		
Candidate	Votes	Percentage	Bound	Unbound	Total
Donald Trump	294,658	96.7%	12	0	12
Write-in votes	9,915	3.3%	0	0	0
Total:	304,573	100.00%	12	0	12

== General election ==
=== Predictions ===
Source	Ranking	As of
Cook Political Report	Solid D	November 1, 2024
Inside Elections	Solid D	October 31, 2024
Sabato's Crystal Ball	Safe D	September 25, 2024
Decision Desk HQ/The Hill	Safe D	August 26, 2024
CNalysis	Solid D	December 30, 2023
CNN	Solid D	January 14, 2024
The Economist	Safe D	October 27, 2024
538	Solid D	October 21, 2024
NBC News	Safe D	October 6, 2024

=== Polling ===
Kamala Harris vs. Donald Trump

Poll source	Date(s) administered	Sample size (Note: Key: A – all adults RV – registered voters LV – likely voters V – unclear)	Margin of error	Kamala Harris Democratic	Donald Trump Republican	Other / Undecided
Research Co.	November 2–3, 2024	450 (LV)	± 4.6%	57%	40%	3%
Rutgers-Eagleton	October 15–22, 2024	451 (RV)	–	55%	35%	10% (Note: "Neither/Someone else" with 6%)
Rutgers-Eagleton	October 15–22, 2024	478 (RV)	–	51% (Note: With each candidate's party affiliation excluded)	37%	12% (Note: "Neither/Someone else" with 7%)
ActiVote	October 2–28, 2024	400 (LV)	± 4.9%	57%	43%	–
Cygnal (R)	October 23–24, 2024	600 (LV)	± 4.0%	52%	40%	8% (Note: "A third-party candidate" with 4%)
ActiVote	September 4 – October 2, 2024	400 (LV)	± 4.9%	56%	44%	–

Hypothetical polling with Joe Biden and Donald Trump

Joe Biden vs. Donald Trump

Poll source	Date(s) administered	Sample size	Margin of error	Joe Biden Democratic	Donald Trump Republican	Other / Undecided
United 2024 (R)	July 1–2, 2024	477 (RV)	± 4.5%	41%	43%	16%
John Zogby Strategies (Note: Poll conducted for Kennedy's campaign)	April 13–21, 2024	530 (LV)	–	51%	42%	7%
Emerson College	March 26–29, 2024	1,000 (RV)	± 3.0%	46%	39%	15%

Joe Biden vs. Donald Trump vs. Robert F. Kennedy Jr. vs. Cornel West vs. Jill Stein

Poll source	Date(s) administered	Sample size	Margin of error	Joe Biden Democratic	Donald Trump Republican	Robert F. Kennedy Jr. Independent	Cornel West Independent	Jill Stein Green	Other / Undecided
United 2024 (R)	July 1–2, 2024	477 (RV)	± 4.5%	43%	43%	8%	—	3%	3%
Emerson College	March 26–29, 2024	1,000 (RV)	± 3.0%	41%	36%	8%	1%	1%	13%

Joe Biden vs. Donald Trump vs. Robert F. Kennedy Jr.

Poll source	Date(s) administered	Sample size	Margin of error	Joe Biden Democratic	Donald Trump Republican	Robert F. Kennedy Jr. Independent	Other / Undecided
co/efficient (R)	June 26–27, 2024	810 (LV)	± 3.4%	40%	41%	7% (Note: Grouped with "Other Third Party Candidate")	12%

Hypothetical polling with other candidates

Joe Biden vs. Robert F. Kennedy Jr.

Poll source	Date(s) administered	Sample size	Margin of error	Joe Biden Democratic	Robert F. Kennedy Jr. Independent	Other / Undecided
John Zogby Strategies	April 13–21, 2024	530 (LV)	–	48%	41%	11%

Robert F. Kennedy Jr. vs. Donald Trump

Poll source	Date(s) administered	Sample size	Margin of error	Robert F. Kennedy Jr. Independent	Donald Trump Republican	Other / Undecided
John Zogby Strategies	April 13–21, 2024	530 (LV)	–	42%	40%	18%

=== Results ===
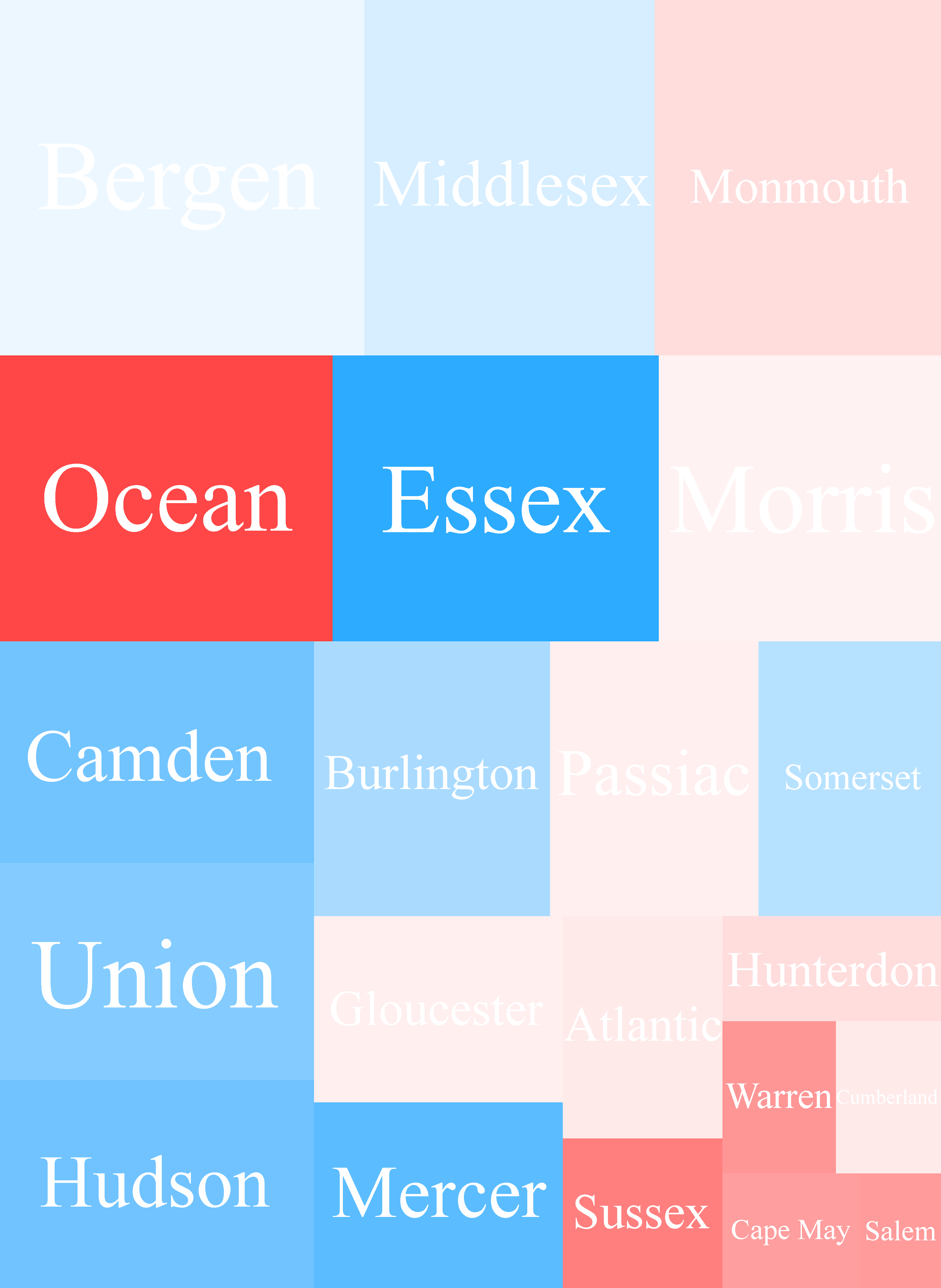
Cartogram of the 2024 presidential election in New Jersey

2024 United States presidential election in New Jersey
Party	Candidate	Votes	%	±%
Democratic	Kamala Harris Tim Walz	2,220,713	51.97%	−5.36%
Republican	Donald Trump JD Vance	1,968,215	46.06%	+4.66%
Green	Jill Stein Butch Ware	39,041	0.91%	+0.60%
Independent	Robert F. Kennedy Jr. (withdrawn); Nicole Shanahan (withdrawn)	23,479	0.55%	N/A
Libertarian	Chase Oliver Mike ter Maat	10,500	0.25%	−0.45%
Socialism and Liberation	Claudia De la Cruz Karina Garcia	5,105	0.12%	+0.06%
Constitution	Randall Terry Stephen Broden	3,024	0.07%	+0.01%
Socialist Equality	Joseph Kishore Jerome White	1,371	0.03%	N/A
Socialist Workers	Rachele Fruit Margaret Trowe (Note: Replaced by Dennis Richter.)	1,277	0.03%	N/A
Total votes		4,272,725	100.00%	N/A
Democratic hold				

==== By county ====
County	Kamala Harris Democratic		Donald Trump Republican		Various candidates Other parties		Margin		Total
County	#	%	#	%	#	%	#	%	Total
Atlantic	61,879	47.69%	65,817	50.72%	2,063	1.59%	-3,938	-3.03%	129,759
Bergen	232,660	50.68%	217,096	47.29%	9,321	2.03%	15,564	3.39%	459,077
Burlington	132,275	57.64%	94,116	41.02%	3,075	1.34%	38,159	16.63%	229,466
Camden	155,522	62.98%	87,767	35.54%	3,665	1.48%	67,755	27.44%	246,954
Cape May	21,648	39.67%	32,151	58.92%	769	1.41%	-10,503	-19.25%	54,568
Cumberland	26,577	47.56%	28,675	51.31%	633	1.13%	-2,098	-3.75%	55,885
Essex	224,596	71.69%	83,908	26.78%	4,779	1.53%	140,688	44.91%	313,283
Gloucester	78,708	47.81%	83,326	50.61%	2,601	1.58%	-4,618	-2.80%	164,635
Hudson	144,765	62.62%	79,913	34.57%	6,503	2.81%	64,852	28.05%	231,181
Hunterdon	36,995	45.72%	42,391	52.38%	1,539	1.90%	-5,396	-6.67%	80,925
Mercer	107,558	65.88%	52,274	32.02%	3,438	2.11%	55,284	33.86%	163,270
Middlesex	191,802	52.52%	162,459	44.49%	10,926	2.99%	29,343	8.04%	365,187
Monmouth	156,382	43.42%	197,409	54.81%	6,352	1.76%	-41,027	-11.39%	360,143
Morris	135,672	47.66%	143,439	50.39%	5,555	1.95%	-7,767	-2.73%	284,666
Ocean	105,789	31.38%	227,232	67.40%	4,114	1.22%	-121,443	-36.02%	337,135
Passaic	95,156	46.93%	100,954	49.79%	6,657	3.28%	-5,798	-2.86%	202,767
Salem	12,275	39.60%	18,229	58.80%	497	1.60%	-5,954	-19.21%	31,001
Somerset	98,790	55.68%	74,101	41.77%	4,521	2.55%	24,689	13.92%	177,412
Sussex	31,019	36.65%	52,123	61.59%	1,487	1.76%	-21,104	-24.94%	84,629
Union	147,327	61.23%	89,063	37.01%	4,242	1.76%	58,264	24.21%	240,632
Warren	23,318	38.77%	35,772	59.47%	1,060	1.76%	-12,454	-20.70%	60,150
Totals	2,220,713	51.97%	1,968,215	46.06%	83,797	1.96%	252,498	5.91%	4,272,725

==== Counties that flipped from Democratic to Republican ====
- Atlantic (largest municipality: Egg Harbor Township)
- Cumberland (largest municipality: Vineland)
- Gloucester (largest municipality: Washington Township)
- Morris (largest municipality: Parsippany)
- Passaic (largest municipality: Paterson)

==== By congressional district ====
Harris won eight of 12 congressional districts, with the remaining four going to Trump, including one that elected a Democrat.

District	Harris	Trump	Representative
1st	58.61%	39.88%	Donald Norcross
2nd	43.00%	55.56%	Jeff Van Drew
3rd	53.36%	45.00%	Andy Kim (118th Congress)
3rd	53.36%	45.00%	Herb Conaway (119th Congress)
4th	34.26%	64.37%	Chris Smith
5th	49.80%	48.29%	Josh Gottheimer
6th	51.95%	45.53%	Frank Pallone Jr.
7th	48.45%	49.63%	Tom Kean Jr.
8th	60.83%	36.65%	Rob Menendez
9th	48.02%	49.16%	Nellie Pou
10th	74.52%	23.75%	LaMonica McIver
11th	53.34%	44.62%	Mikie Sherrill
12th	60.57%	36.70%	Bonnie Watson Coleman

==== By state legislative district ====
By state legislative district: Harris 40–50% 50–60% 60–70% 80–90% / Trump 40–50% 50–60% 60–70% 70–80%

Harris won 25 of 40 state legislative districts. Harris carried three districts (2nd, 8th, 21st) represented by Republican senators, while Trump carried three districts represented by Democratic senators (3rd, 36th, 38th).

District	Harris	Trump	State senator
1st	44%	55%	Mike Testa
2nd	50%	48%	Vincent J. Polistina
3rd	45%	53%	John Burzichelli
4th	50%	48%	Paul D. Moriarty
5th	64%	35%	Nilsa Cruz-Perez
6th	63%	35%	James Beach
7th	64%	35%	Troy Singleton
8th	50%	49%	Latham Tiver
9th	35%	64%	Carmen Amato
10th	35%	63%	James W. Holzapfel
11th	51%	47%	Vin Gopal
12th	36%	61%	Owen Henry
13th	41%	57%	Declan O'Scanlon
14th	54%	43%	Linda R. Greenstein
15th	70%	28%	Shirley Turner
16th	55%	41%	Andrew Zwicker
17th	64%	32%	Bob Smith
18th	53%	43%	Patrick J. Diegnan
19th	49%	48%	Joe F. Vitale
20th	61%	37%	Joseph Cryan
21st	55%	43%	Jon Bramnick
22nd	61%	37%	Nicholas Scutari
23rd	44%	54%	Doug Steinhardt
24th	39%	59%	Parker Space
25th	49%	49%	Anthony M. Bucco
26th	44%	53%	Joseph Pennacchio
27th	64%	33%	John F. McKeon
28th	88%	11%	Renee Burgess
29th	70%	29%	Teresa Ruiz
30th	26%	72%	Robert W. Singer
31st	62%	35%	Angela V. McKnight
32nd	70%	27%	Raj Mukherji
33rd	55%	42%	Brian P. Stack
34th	69%	29%	Britnee Timberlake
35th	54%	42%	Nellie Pou
36th	47%	51%	Paul Sarlo
37th	60%	37%	Gordon M. Johnson
38th	49%	49%	Joseph Lagana
39th	48%	50%	Holly Schepisi
40th	45%	52%	Kristin Corrado

== Analysis ==
Trump retook Gloucester County and Morris County, both of which he won in 2016 but lost to Biden in 2020. Additionally, Trump is the first Republican to win Passaic County since 1992, as well as Atlantic County and Cumberland County since 1988, while also being the first Republican presidential candidate to win a majority of the state's counties since 1992.

The largest swings were in North Jersey, although Trump also flipped counties in South Jersey. This is likely related to North Jersey being part of the New York metropolitan area, which swung heavily to the right in this election.

Trump's success in New Jersey was partially attributed to his success among Hispanic and Latino Americans and Italian Americans, who shifted hard to the right nationally. This was seen in most of New Jersey's majority-Hispanic towns, which collectively shifted 25% to the right, a much higher rate than the state of New Jersey as a whole. In some majority-Hispanic cities, the Democratic Party's margin collapsed by as much as over 30% (Perth Amboy's margin shrunk by 33%), an underperformance that helped Trump flip Hispanic-plurality Passaic County. This was attributed by Republican strategists on the ground to a perceived overly strong focus on identity politics and immigration instead of household issues. Trump's success did not, however, translate down-ballot, as most Democratic legislators put up double-digit overperformances compared to Harris, a phenomenon that appeared to be partially due to Trump-supporting Hispanics voting for Trump and leaving the rest of the ballot empty. With this election, and Republican Jack Ciattarelli's strong performance in the 2021 gubernatorial election, some analysts believed New Jersey has transitioned from a reliable blue state into a potential swing state, although Democrats put up a double digit win in the 2025 New Jersey gubernatorial election.

== See also ==
- United States presidential elections in New Jersey
- 2024 United States presidential election
- 2024 Democratic Party presidential primaries
- 2024 Republican Party presidential primaries
- 2024 United States elections

== Notes ==
Partisan clients
