= Dennis L. Riley =

American politician (1945–2023)

Member of the New Jersey General Assembly from the 4th Legislative District
- In office January 8, 1980 – January 9, 1990 Serving with Daniel Dalton and Anthony S. Marsella
- Preceded by: Francis J. Gorman and Kenneth A. Gewertz
- Succeeded by: Ann A. Mullen

Personal details
- Born: September 13, 1945 Ottawa, Illinois, U.S.
- Died: May 24, 2023 (aged 77)
- Party: Democratic
- Spouse: Yvonne Schultes
- Children: 1
- Education: Xavier University; University of Cincinnati; Rutgers School of Law–Camden

Dennis L. Riley (September 13, 1945 – May 24, 2023) was an American attorney and Democratic Party politician who served in the New Jersey General Assembly, where he represented the 4th Legislative District from 1980 to 1990.

== Personal life ==
Born in Ottawa, Illinois on September 13, 1945, Riley moved as a child to Collingswood, New Jersey and attended Eustace Preparatory School. He was educated on the undergraduate level at Xavier University and the University of Cincinnati, receiving a J.D. degree in 1972 from the Rutgers School of Law–Camden. As a practicing lawyer, Riley was a partner at Riley and DiCamillo. In addition to serving as an assistant counsel to Camden County, Riley has represented zoning, planning, and rent control boards or served as a prosecutor in the municipalities of Chesilhurst, Clementon, Lindenwold and Winslow Township across Camden County. He had been appointed to serve on the planning board in Gloucester Township, New Jersey.

Riley was married to Yvonne Schultes, with whom he had a son, born in 1979.

Riley died on May 24, 2023, at the age of 77.

== Elected office ==
In 1979, James Florio, then a Congressman, encouraged Daniel Dalton and Riley to run in the June primary under the label of the "Florio Democratic Team" against three-term incumbents Kenneth A. Gewertz and Francis J. Gorman, who had the support of Angelo Errichetti and the Camden County Democratic Organization. Dalton (with 31.3% of the vote) and Riley (with 28.3%) won the two ballot spots in the primary balloting.

A resident of Gloucester Township, Riley and Democratic running mate Daniel J. Dalton were elected in the November 1979 general election to represent the 4th District in the General Assembly, which covered portions of Burlington County, Camden County and Gloucester County. With Burlington County removed from the 4th District and portions of Atlantic County added in redistricting following the 1980 United States census and with Dalton running for the New Jersey Senate seat that had been held by Democrat Joseph A. Maressa, Riley was elected together with running mate Anthony S. Marsella; he was reelected with Marsella in 1983, 1985, and 1987.

As a member of the General Assembly, Riley led the South Jersey Assembly Coalition and served on the Mobile Home Tax Study Commission (as chairman), the Independent Authorities and Commissions Committee (as vice chairman) and as a member of the Legislative Services Commission.

In March 1981, a month after he had sponsored legislation to require casinos to offer patrons table games with a $2 minimum bet, Riley was ejected from two casinos in Atlantic City – Bally's Park Place and the Brighton Hotel and Casino – which had alleged that he was counting cards while playing blackjack. Characterizing himself as "a very good basic skills player" at blackjack who lacks the ability to count cards, Riley described being rudely ejected from the Brighton Casino after running up winnings of $3,500; he complained at the casino to a representative of the New Jersey Casino Control Commission regarding the incident, but said that no action was taken to address his issues with his treatment by the casino.

A bill introduced and doggedly pursued by Riley was signed into law in May 1986 by Governor Thomas Kean, granting volunteer coaches and officials in Little League and other youth sports programs immunity from lawsuits that they might face through their involvement and participation. Riley expressed his frustration that Republicans, after taking control of the legislature, were unfairly taking credit for a legislative initiative that they had previously blocked.

In the 1987 election, Riley and his Democratic Party running mates faced a vigorous challenge from the Republicans, who claimed that Riley had missed the most votes of any Assembly member, missing or abstaining from 18% of the votes in the 1984–1985 session and almost 19% in 1986–1987. Riley noted that the missed votes were due to health issues that had resulted in surgery and operations during that time period, with other abstentions made to register his protest with the way the legislation was worded and as a means to encourage amendments that would pass with his affirmative vote. Camden County Republican Chairman George Geist charged that Riley had abused his position in office as a way to get work for his law firm with several of the municipalities in the district; Riley rejected the claims and expressed his confidence that he would prevail in the general election and would be chosen as Assembly Speaker in the new legislative session.

South Jersey Democratic Party leader George Norcross informed Riley in February 1989 that he would not get official party support in the June 1989 party primary for a sixth term, with Riley's ballot spot – and Assembly seat – to be handed over to Ann A. Mullen, who had worked as a legislative aide to Riley and was serving as mayor of Gloucester Township. At a press conference convened by Norcross a few hours after the private meeting, Riley stated that the actions to withdraw support for him were in poor taste, but that he wasn't bitter and looked forward to devoting more time to his legal practice and spending the full summer at his home on the Jersey Shore in Sea Isle City. Riley told The Press of Atlantic City that his decade of service in the Assembly had left him "fatigued" and that he felt relief from the weight that was removed from him by being replaced by Mullen, who he publicly endorsed as his successor. In October 1989, Riley organized a farewell party attended by his parents, along with 300 constituents and fellow members of the legislature, marking his departure from the Assembly.
