= Anthony Marsella =

Anthony Marsella may refer to:

- Anthony J. Marsella (1940–2024), American author and academic
- Anthony S. Marsella (born 1947), American politician
