= Sean Dalton =

Sean Dalton may refer to:

- Sean Dalton (musician) (born 1980), Canadian musician with The Trews
- Sean F. Dalton (born 1962), American Democratic Party politician in New Jersey
