= Barry T. Parker =

American politician (1932–2026)

Barry Tallman Parker (December 12, 1932 – September 17, 2026) was an American Republican Party politician who served in both the General Assembly and the New Jersey Senate.

== Life and career ==
Parker was born in Mount Holly, New Jersey on December 12, 1932. He graduated from the Bordentown Military Institute in 1950. Parker received his A.B. degree from Bucknell University in 1954 and his LL.B. degree from Rutgers University in 1960.

He was first elected to the General Assembly in 1965 and was reelected in 1967 and 1969. He was named Speaker of the Assembly in 1971. While serving as Speaker, he was elected to the State Senate. He was reelected in 1973 and 1977 and served as Minority Leader.

Parker did not seek reelection for his Senate seat in 1981, instead running for Governor of New Jersey. In a crowded field for the Republican primary, he garnered 7% of the vote, coming in fifth behind Thomas Kean (31%), Paterson Mayor Lawrence F. Kramer (21%), businessman Joseph A. Sullivan (17%), and State Senator James Wallwork.

Candidate	Office	Votes	%
Thomas Kean	Former Assembly Speaker	122,512	31%
Pat Kramer	Former Mayor of Paterson	83,565	21%
Bo Sullivan	Businessman	67,651	17%
James Wallwork	State Senator	61,816	16%
Barry T. Parker	State Senator	26,040	7%
Anthony Imperiale	State Assemblyman	18,452	5%
Jack Rafferty	Mayor of Hamilton	12,837	3%
Richard McGlynn	Former Superior Court Judge	5,486	1%

He was of counsel at the law firm Parker, McCay in Marlton, New Jersey.

Parker died on September 17, 2026, at the age of 93.

New Jersey General Assembly
Preceded by Multi-member district	Member of the New Jersey General Assembly from the Burlington County district January 11, 1966–January 9, 1968	Succeeded by Constituency abolished
Preceded by Constituency established	Member of the New Jersey General Assembly from the 4B district January 9, 1968–January 11, 1972; Served alongside: Walter L. Smith Jr.	Succeeded by Benjamin H. Mabie; H. Kenneth Wilkie
New Jersey Senate
Preceded by Walter L. Smith Jr. William T. Hiering	Member of the New Jersey Senate from the 4th district January 11, 1972–January 8, 1974; Served alongside: John F. Brown, Edward J. Hughes Jr.	Succeeded by Constituency abolished
Preceded by Constituency established	Member of the New Jersey Senate from the 8th district January 8, 1974–January 12, 1982	Succeeded by Jim Saxton
Political offices
Preceded by William K. Dickey	Speaker of the New Jersey General Assembly; 1971	Succeeded by Thomas Kean
