= Gabriela Mosquera =

Member of the New Jersey General Assembly

Member of the New Jersey General Assembly from the 4th Legislative District
- In office March 5, 2012 – January 9, 2024 Serving with Paul D. Moriarty
- Preceded by: Domenick DiCicco
- Succeeded by: Dan Hutchison; Cody Miller

Chair of the New Jersey General Assembly Committee on Woman and Children
- Incumbent
- Assumed office January 9, 2018
- Preceded by: Pamela R. Lampitt

Personal details
- Born: January 3, 1977 (age 49) Guayaquil, Ecuador
- Party: Democratic
- Website: Legislative Website

Gabriela M. Mosquera (born January 3, 1977) is an American Democratic Party politician, who represented the 4th Legislative District in the New Jersey General Assembly from March 5, 2012, until January 9, 2024.

== Early life ==
Mosquera was born on January 3, 1977, in Guayaquil, Ecuador, and immigrated to the United States at the age of three. Mosquera received a B.A. degree from The College of New Jersey, where she majored in political science and was awarded an M.B.A. from the Keller Graduate School of Management at Devry University. After college, she worked as a policy analyst for the Assembly Democratic Caucus and later as an assistant to 5th District Assemblywoman Nilsa Cruz-Perez. She is currently the chief of staff to Gloucester Township mayor David R. Mayer. She has lived in the Blackwood section of Gloucester Township since 2011.

== New Jersey Assembly ==
Due to the 2011 apportionment based on the results of the 2010 United States census, the 4th District Assembly seat of Domenick DiCicco, a Republican, became vacant, with DiCicco placed in the 3rd District where he lost to the Democratic incumbents. Mosquera ran for the vacant seat on the Democratic ticket with the incumbent Paul D. Moriarty. In the general election, she and Moriarty defeated the Republican candidates, former Gloucester Township councilwoman Shelley Lovett and Patricia Fratticcioli. By taking DiCicco's seat, Mosquera represented the only gain by the Democrats in the Assembly in the 2011 election cycle. In response to a lawsuit filed by Lovett, Mosquera could not be sworn into office in January 2012 and a ruling issued the next month by the New Jersey Supreme Court declared Mosquera's November 2011 win invalid, saying that her move to Gloucester Township did not meet the one-year residency requirement established in state law. Mosquera was sworn into office on March 5 after she was selected by district Democrats and filed to face off again against Lovett in a November 2012 special election. In June 2012, the United States District Court for the District of New Jersey overturned the N.J. Supreme Court ruling and upheld her November 2011 election, finding that an injunction that prohibits enforcement of the one-year residency rule is in force in years in which redistricting takes place. Mosquera won the November 2012 special election for the remainder of the term, defeating Lovett by a margin of 60 to 40 percent.

At the time of her last legislative session, she served as the chair of the Women and Children Committee and served on the Appropriations Committee.

She announced in 2023 that she would not run for re-election.

== District 4 ==
Each of the 40 districts in the New Jersey Legislature has one representative in the New Jersey Senate and two members in the New Jersey General Assembly. The representatives from the 4th District for the 2022—2023 Legislative Session are:

- Senator Fred H. Madden (D),
- Assemblyman Paul D. Moriarty (D)
- Assemblywoman Gabriela Mosquera (D)

== Electoral history ==
=== Assembly ===
New Jersey General Assembly Election, District 4
Party	Candidate	Votes	%	±%
Democratic	Paul D. Moriarty (Incumbent)			
Democratic	Gabriela Mosquera (Incumbent)			
Republican	Paul Dilks			
Republican	Stephen Pakradrooni			
Total votes				

New Jersey general election, 2017
Party	Candidate	Votes	%	±%
Democratic	Paul D. Moriarty	32,892	32.2	▲1.8
Democratic	Gabriela M. Mosquera	31,800	31.2	▲1.3
Republican	Patricia Jefferson Kline	18,386	18.0	▼2.2
Republican	Eduardo J. Maldonado	17,761	17.4	▼2.0
Represent, Not Rule	William McCauley Jr.	1,194	1.2	N/A
Total votes		'102,033'	'100.0'	

New Jersey general election, 2015
Party	Candidate	Votes	%	±%
Democratic	Paul D. Moriarty	17,454	30.4	▲1.4
Democratic	Gabriela M. Mosquera	17,147	29.9	▲2.3
Republican	Kevin P. Murphy	11,592	20.2	▼1.9
Republican	Jack Nicholson	11,131	19.4	▼2.0
Total votes		'57,324'	'100.0'	

New Jersey General Assembly elections, 2013
Party	Candidate	Votes	%
Democratic	Paul D. Moriarty (incumbent)	28,527	29.0
Democratic	Gabriela Mosquera (incumbent)	27,095	27.6
Republican	Philip Dieser	21,702	22.1
Republican	Theodore M. Liddell	20,998	21.4
Democratic hold			

Special election to the New Jersey General Assembly, 2012
Party	Candidate	Votes	%
Democratic	Gabriela Mosquera (incumbent)	55,027	60.6
Republican	Shelley Lovett	35,835	39.4
Democratic hold			

New Jersey General Assembly elections, 2011
Party	Candidate	Votes	%
Democratic	Paul D. Moriarty (incumbent)	22,734	30.0
Democratic	Gabriela Mosquera	21,461	28.3
Republican	Shelley Lovett	15,106	19.9
Republican	Patricia Fratticcioli	14,275	18.8
Independent	Tony Celeste	1,843	2.5
Democratic gain from Republican			

New Jersey General Assembly
Preceded by Domenick DiCicco	Member of the New Jersey General Assembly for the 4th District; March 5, 2012 – present With: Paul D. Moriarty	Succeeded by Incumbent
