= John J. Matheussen =

American politician

Member of the New Jersey Senate from the 4th district
- In office January 14, 1992 – May 28, 2003
- Preceded by: Daniel Dalton
- Succeeded by: George Geist

Personal details
- Born: January 30, 1953 (age 73) Jersey City, New Jersey
- Party: Republican
- Education: Seton Hall University (BA); University of Dayton (JD)

John J. Matheussen (born January 30, 1953) is an American Republican Party politician. He served in the New Jersey Senate from 1992 to 2003, where he represented the 4th Legislative District.

== Early life and education ==
Born in Jersey City, Matheussen grew up in Secaucus, New Jersey, and graduated from Weehawken High School. He earned his undergraduate degree, a B.A. in Communications, from Seton Hall University and was awarded a J.D. from the University of Dayton School of Law.

== Political career ==
In the 1991 Republican landslide in the New Jersey Legislature, Matheussen won an open Senate seat over Assemblyman Anthony S. Marsella, while his running mates George Geist and Mary Virginia Weber won in the Assembly. In the 1991 race, Matheusen took the seat vacated by three-term incumbent Daniel J. Dalton with 51.7% of the vote, with Marsella polling 48.3%. Matheusen won re-election in 1991 over Bernard Lynch by a 58.9%-41.1% margin, over Sean F. Dalton in a three-way race in 1997 by a 50.7%-46.1% margin and again in 2001 by a 58.3%-41.8% margin over Joseph Manganello.

Matheusen introduced legislation in the Senate in March 1999 to implement the $1 billion property tax rebate proposed by Governor of New Jersey Christine Todd Whitman which would start at $120 per family at its initiation and was planned to grow to $600 per household in its fifth year. He was an unsuccessful candidate for the Republican nomination for the United States Senate in 2002, with businessman Doug Forrester winning the party's nomination. Forrester won the primary with 44.6% of the vote and State Senator Diane Allen came in second with 36.9%, ahead of Matheussen who garnered 18.6% of the vote. Matheussen was nominated by Governor of New Jersey Jim McGreevey in February 2003 to head the Delaware River Port Authority. After Matheussen resigned from the Senate in May 2003 to take the post at the DRPA, his Senate seat was filled by Assemblyman George Geist.

An attorney with the firm of Dilworth Paxson LLP, Matheussen has been a resident of the Sewell section of Washington Township, Gloucester County, New Jersey. In 2014, he was nominated by Governor Chris Christie and confirmed as a judge on New Jersey Superior Court.
