= Walter L. Smith Jr. =

American politician

Member of the New Jersey Senate from District 4B
- In office March 15, 1971 – January 11, 1972
- Preceded by: Edwin B. Forsythe
- Succeeded by: Barry T. Parker

Member of the New Jersey General Assembly
- In office January 14, 1964 – March 15, 1971
- Preceded by: George H. Barbour; G. Edward Koenig
- Succeeded by: Benjamin H. Mabie; H. Kenneth Wilkie
- Constituency: District 4B (1968–1971); Burlington County (1964–1968)

Personal details
- Born: December 17, 1917 Cinnaminson Township, New Jersey
- Died: July 10, 1994 (aged 76) Cinnaminson Township, New Jersey
- Party: Republican
- Spouse: Alice

Walter L. Smith Jr. (December 17, 1917 – July 10, 1994) was an American Republican politician who served in the New Jersey General Assembly from 1964 to 1971 and in the New Jersey Senate from 1971 to 1972.

While in the Legislature, he was a strong opponent to the state income tax and the raising of the sales tax.

He was married to Alice H. Smith and was the father of future State Senator Bradford S. Smith.
