= Gerald Luongo =

American politician (born 1938)

Mayor of Washington Township, New Jersey
- In office 1989–2000

Member of the New Jersey General Assembly from the 4th district
- In office January 13, 1998 – January 11, 2000
- Preceded by: Sean F. Dalton
- Succeeded by: Robert J. Smith II

Personal details
- Born: June 2, 1938 (age 88)
- Party: Democratic (until 1995, 2023-present)
- Other political affiliations: Republican (1995-2023)
- Education: Juilliard School (AA); Trenton State College (BA, M.Ed); Southwestern University (PhD)

Gerald J. Luongo (born June 2, 1938) is an American politician who served as mayor of Washington Township, Gloucester County, New Jersey from 1989 until 2000 and served one term in the New Jersey General Assembly from 1998 to 2000, where he represented the 4th Legislative District.

== Education ==
Luongo was born and raised in Collingswood, New Jersey, and attended Collingswood High School. He earned an associate degree in music from the Juilliard School, a bachelor's and a master's degree in education and music from Trenton State College, and a Ph.D. in administration and communications from Southwestern University.

== Career ==
Luongo was employed as principal at Vineland High School in Cumberland County. He served on the Washington Township Public School District board of education from 1972 to 1981.

In 1988, Luongo ran and won as the Democratic candidate for mayor of Washington Township, Gloucester County, New Jersey. In that role, he served on the Washington Township Planning Board. He switched parties in 1995 and ran unsuccessfully for the General Assembly that year. In 1997, he was elected to the General Assembly, winning a seat with Republican running mate and incumbent George Geist. In the Assembly, he served on the Education Committee and the Local Government and Housing Committee.

Despite efforts by pro-gun-rights organizations to support Geist and Luongo in the 1999 race, Luongo faced negative advertisements that focused on a land deal that was said to have aided investors close to him. Luongo took offense at Democratic Party ads that depicted Luongo as a "Godfather", criticizing the ads as a slur against Italian Americans.

In the 1999 general elections, Geist took one seat, but Luongo was edged out for the second seat by Democrat Robert J. Smith II, who won the second seat and by Democrat David F. Carlamere who came in third place.

Luongo proposed legislation in 1999 to create an official New Jersey Nature Card that could be used for debit and credit transactions by residents and would earn money for the state based on the volume of purchases to fund endangered species protection and other environmental efforts, similar to a program that had already been initiated in Washington Township that had raised $30,000 for recreation in the township.

=== Conviction ===
In April 2002, Luongo was sentenced to serve 13 months in jail for his role in misusing campaign and community program funds for personal use, which included rent and mortgage payments, car payments, credit card bills, vacations and restaurant celebrations.

He was ordered by U.S. District Judge Anne Elise Thompson to make restitution of nearly $15,000, along with fines in excess of $20,000, which in total equal the amount that Luongo misappropriated as stipulated in his plea agreement. During his 11 months at Federal Prison Camp, Eglin, Luongo wrote the book Surviving Federal Prison Camp: An Informative and Helpful Guide for Prospective Inmates, which he self-published in February 2004. After his release, Luongo attempted to form a new charter school in Gloucester County but his request was denied by the state.
