= David R. Mayer =

American politician

Mayor of Gloucester Township, New Jersey
- Incumbent
- Assumed office January 2, 2010
- Preceded by: Cindy Rau-Hatton

Member of the New Jersey General Assembly from the 4th district
- In office January 13, 2004 – January 8, 2008 Serving with Robert J. Smith II, Paul D. Moriarty
- Preceded by: Stephen Altamuro
- Succeeded by: Sandra Love

Personal details
- Born: February 28, 1967 (age 59)
- Party: Democratic Party
- Spouse: Michelle Mayer (m. 2015)
- Education: Rutgers University–Camden

David R. Mayer (born February 28, 1967) is an American Democratic Party politician and the current mayor of Gloucester Township, New Jersey.

Mayer served in the New Jersey General Assembly from 2004 to 2008, where he represented the 4th Legislative District. He was a member of the General Assembly's Education Committee, Transportation and Public Works Committee, and the Intergovernmental Relations Commission.

Mayer served in the Camden County Clerk's Office from 1995 to 2003 as Chief of Staff. He was a member of the Gloucester Township Council from 2002 to 2003. From 1990 to 1995 he was the district director of U.S. Representative Robert Andrews’s District Office for the New Jersey's First Congressional District. Mayer taught courses in political science at Rowan University and in public administration at Rutgers University-Camden.

== Biography ==
Mayer graduated from Rutgers University–Camden with a B.A. in Psychology and a M.P.A. in Public Policy. He was awarded a J.D. degree from Rutgers School of Law–Camden. He is a resident of the Blackwood section of Gloucester Township.

Mayer was elected mayor of Gloucester Township, New Jersey and took office on January 2, 2010. In 2015, he married Camden County Freeholder Michelle Gentek-Mayer.

Mayor Mayer is an adjunct professor at Rowan University, teaching courses on public administration, public policy, and political science.
