= Paul D. Moriarty =

Member of the New Jersey General Assembly

Paul Moriarty

Member of the New Jersey Senate from the 4th district
- Incumbent
- Assumed office January 9, 2024
- Preceded by: Fred H. Madden

Member of the New Jersey General Assembly from the 4th district
- In office January 10, 2006 – January 9, 2024 Serving with Gabriela Mosquera
- Preceded by: Robert J. Smith II
- Succeeded by: Dan Hutchison; Cody Miller

Deputy Speaker of the New Jersey General Assembly
- In office January 9, 2018 – January 9, 2024
- Leader: Craig Coughlin
- Preceded by: John Wisniewski
- Succeeded by: TBD

Chairman of the New Jersey General Assembly Committee on Consumer Affairs
- In office January 12, 2010 – January 9, 2024

Mayor of Washington Township, New Jersey
- In office January 1, 2005 – December 31, 2008
- Preceded by: Randee Davidson
- Succeeded by: Matthew Lyons

Personal details
- Born: September 25, 1956 (age 69)
- Party: Democratic
- Spouse: Lisa Moriarty
- Children: 1
- Website: Legislative Website

Paul D. Moriarty (born September 25, 1956) is an American Democratic Party politician who has represented the 4th Legislative District in the New Jersey Senate since taking office on January 9, 2024. He served in the New Jersey General Assembly from 2006 to 2024 and was the Assembly's Deputy Speaker from 2018 to 2024.

== Early life ==
Moriarty worked as an investigative journalist at KYW-TV for 17 years protecting consumer rights and investigating unscrupulous or unethical businesses. Before KYW, Moriarty was a news producer at WCAU-TV. Moriarty has earned over 30 Emmy Awards, honors from the National Press Association, the Associated Press and the Radio-Television News Directors Association. He was a member of American Federation of Television and Radio Artists (AFTRA) for 20 years while working as a journalist. He served six years as a shop steward.

== Mayor of Washington Township ==
Running on a platform of open government, property tax relief, and the elimination of waste and inefficiency, Moriarty was elected Mayor of Washington Township in November 2004. He garnered 60% of the vote in a hotly contested four-way race in which Republican voters were sharply divided. He was mayor of Washington Township for one term from 2005 until 2008. After forming a recall committee, on June 9, 2006, a Washington Township resident filed a petition to recall Moriarty from his post as mayor, with the goal of placing the initiative on the November 2006 general election ballot based on obtaining the requisite number of about 8,000 signatures needed for recall. The recall effort was ultimately unsuccessful.

== New Jersey Assembly ==
Moriarty was elected to the Assembly on November 8, 2005, filling the seat of fellow Democrat Robert J. Smith II, who did not run for re-election and had held the seat in the Assembly since 2000. On June 1, 2006, Assemblyman Moriarty, along with State Senator Stephen M. Sweeney (D, 3rd legislative district) and fellow Assembly Democrat Jerry Green (D, 22nd legislative district), held a press conference to announce their support for significant cuts to New Jersey state worker salaries and benefits of up to 15%. This effort was proposed to avoid a one-point increase in the state's sales tax designed to cover a multibillion-dollar gap in the state's budget. Significant negative reaction from the state's labor unions resulted primarily because of Sweeney's position as an Ironworkers business agent and treasurer from Gloucester County for Ironworker's Local 399, and also due to his position as the chairman of the Senate Labor committee which controls most labor-related bills, but also because of Moriarty's history as an AFTRA shop steward and stated support of the collective bargaining process.

== New Jersey Senate ==
With Fred H. Madden not running for re-election, Moriarty ran to fill his seat and defeated Republican Christopher W. Del Borrello and independent Giuseppe Costanzo in the 2023 New Jersey Senate election.

In 2026, he sponsored a bill that would give New Jersey food establishments that have been in continuous operation for 25 years a tax credit of $25,000 a year and would no longer have to charge sales tax. Moriarty said around 500 food establishments would qualify.

=== Committees ===
Committee assignments for the current session are:

- Law and Public Safety as vice-chair
- Higher Education
- Labor

== District 4 ==
Each of the 40 districts in the New Jersey Legislature has one representative in the New Jersey Senate and two members in the New Jersey General Assembly. The representatives from the 4th District for the 2024—2025 Legislative Session are:

- Senator Paul D. Moriarty (D)
- Assemblyman Dan Hutchison (D)
- Assemblyman Cody Miller (D)

== Personal life ==
Moriarty was raised in Salem, Massachusetts and received a B.A. from Temple University in Communications. He has been a resident of Washington Township, Gloucester County, New Jersey since 1996. He and his wife Lisa have a daughter, Meghan. Moriarty, who had sponsored a bill for increasing penalties for those making false emergency calls in a process called swatting, was the recipient of a hoax call at his home in April 2015.

On July 31, 2012, Moriarty was pulled over by Washington Township police officer Joseph DiBuonaventura on Route 42 for allegedly driving while intoxicated. Moriarty denied the charges. The police dashcam in DiBuonaventura's car contradicted his police report and charges against Moriarty were dismissed. DiBuonaventura was found not guilty on charges of misconduct and further charges against him were dropped when a judge ruled that the Township's police procedures were unlawful. As a result of the incident, Moriarty has created legislation that would require dashcams in all new police cars.

== Electoral history ==
=== Senate ===
4th Legislative District General Election, 2023
Party	Candidate	Votes	%
Democratic	Paul D. Moriarty	30,728	53.5
Republican	Christopher W. Del Borrello	25,010	43.5
Conservatives South Jersey	Giuseppe Costanzo	1,712	3.0
Total votes		57,450	100.0
Democratic hold			

=== Assembly ===
4th Legislative District General Election, 2021
Party	Candidate	Votes	%
Democratic	Paul D. Moriarty (incumbent)	36,480	26.49%
Democratic	Gabriela M. Mosquera (incumbent)	35,561	25.83%
Republican	Patricia Kline	32,403	23.53%
Republican	Denise Gonzalez	32,025	23.26%
Libertarian	Nicholas Magner	1,218	0.88%
Total votes		137,687	100.0
Democratic hold			

4th Legislative District General Election, 2019
Party	Candidate	Votes	%
Democratic	Paul Moriarty (incumbent)	22,347	29.87%
Democratic	Gabriela Mosquera (incumbent)	21,920	29.3%
Republican	Paul Dilks	15,748	21.05%
Republican	Stephen Pakradooni, Jr.	14,806	19.79%
Total votes		74,821	100%
Democratic hold			

New Jersey general election, 2017
Party	Candidate	Votes	%	±%
Democratic	Paul D. Moriarty	32,892	32.2	▲1.8
Democratic	Gabriela M. Mosquera	31,800	31.2	▲1.3
Republican	Patricia Jefferson Kline	18,386	18.0	▼2.2
Republican	Eduardo J. Maldonado	17,761	17.4	▼2.0
Represent, Not Rule	William McCauley Jr.	1,194	1.2	N/A
Total votes		'102,033'	'100.0'	

New Jersey general election, 2015
Party	Candidate	Votes	%	±%
Democratic	Paul D. Moriarty	17,454	30.4	▲1.4
Democratic	Gabriela M. Mosquera	17,147	29.9	▲2.3
Republican	Kevin P. Murphy	11,592	20.2	▼1.9
Republican	Jack Nicholson	11,131	19.4	▼2.0
Total votes		'57,324'	'100.0'	

New Jersey general election, 2013
Party	Candidate	Votes	%	±%
Democratic	Paul D. Moriarty	28,527	29.0	▼1.0
Democratic	Gabriela M. Mosquera	27,095	27.6	▼0.7
Republican	Philip Dieser	21,702	22.1	▲2.2
Republican	Theodore M. Liddell	20,998	21.4	▲2.0
Total votes		'98,322'	'100.0'	

New Jersey general election, 2011
Party	Candidate	Votes	%
Democratic	Paul D. Moriarty	22,734	30.0
Democratic	Gabriela Mosquera	21,461	28.3
Republican	Shelley Lovett	15,106	19.9
Republican	Patricia Fratticcioli	14,725	19.4
Family, Freedom, Community	Tony Celeste	1,843	2.4
Total votes		75,869	100.0

New Jersey general election, 2009
Party	Candidate	Votes	%	±%
Democratic	Paul D. Moriarty	28,680	26.3	▼1.5
Republican	Domenick DiCicco	27,408	25.2	▲2.7
Democratic	William Collins	26,807	24.6	▼3.3
Republican	Eugene E. T. Lawrence	26,027	23.9	▲2.0
Total votes		'108,922'	'100.0'	

New Jersey general election, 2007
Party	Candidate	Votes	%	±%
Democratic	Sandra Love	19,429	27.9	▼3.9
Democratic	Paul D. Moriarty	19,357	27.8	▼4.0
Republican	Patricia Fratticcioli	15,656	22.5	▲3.7
Republican	Agnes Gardiner	15,238	21.9	▲4.4
Total votes		'69,680'	'100.0'	

New Jersey general election, 2005
Party	Candidate	Votes	%	±%
Democratic	Paul D. Moriarty	31,976	31.8	▲4.5
Democratic	David R. Mayer	31,948	31.8	▲4.8
Republican	Frank Winters	18,908	18.8	▼4.1
Republican	Corey Ahart	17,597	17.5	▼5.4
Total votes		'100,429'	'100.0'	

Political offices
Preceded by Randee Davidson	Mayor of Washington Township, Gloucester County, New Jersey; January 1, 2005–December 31, 2008	Succeeded by Matthew Lyons
New Jersey General Assembly
Preceded by Robert J. Smith II	Member of the New Jersey General Assembly from the 4th district January 10, 2006–January 9, 2024; Served alongside: David R. Mayer, Sandra Love, Domenick DiCicco, Gabriela Mosquera	Succeeded by S. Daniel "Dan" Hutchison; Cody Miller
New Jersey Senate
Preceded by Fred H. Madden	Member of the New Jersey Senate from the 4th district Taking office January 9, 2024	Elect
