= Sean F. Dalton =

American politician

Sean Dalton

Prosecutor of Gloucester County, New Jersey
- In office 2002–2017

Member of the New Jersey General Assembly from the 4th district
- In office 1994–1998

Personal details
- Born: March 10, 1962 (age 64) Camden, New Jersey, U.S.
- Relations: Daniel Dalton (brother)
- Education: James Madison University (BA); Quinnipiac University (JD)

Sean F. Dalton (born March 10, 1962) is an American politician who served as the Prosecutor of Gloucester County, New Jersey from 2002 to 2017. He previously served two terms in the New Jersey General Assembly, where he represented the 4th Legislative District.

== Early life and education ==
Dalton was born in Camden, New Jersey, on March 10, 1962, and grew up in Glassboro, New Jersey and graduated from Glassboro High School. Dalton earned his undergraduate degree from James Madison University with a major in political science and psychology and was awarded his J.D. degree from the Quinnipiac University School of Law.

== Career ==
Dalton won an Assembly seat in the 1993 election in a split verdict, with Republican George Geist coming in first, Dalton in second, incumbent Republican Mary Virginia Weber in third place and Dalton's running mate Sandra Love in fourth. Geist and Dalton were re-elected in 1995, with Democrat Chris Manganello in third and Republican Gerald Luongo in fourth. The $1 million spent by the candidates in the 1993 Assembly race was the most of any district in the state, and The New York Times predicted that the parties would spend heavily in the 1995 race as each side tried to gain both seats.

While in the General Assembly, Dalton served as Associate Minority Leader starting in 1996 and was a member of the Commerce and Military and Veterans' Affairs Committee and the Labor Committee. In 1997, Dalton criticized automobile insurance companies for putting money in separate reserve funds to pay for claims that might come in the future, and then asking for rate increases due to lack of profitability, "but it is not a true picture of the company's economic status".

Dalton ran unsuccessfully for the New Jersey Senate seat held by John J. Matheussen, with Matheussen taking 50.7% of the vote, Dalton receiving 46.1% and Jame E. Barber garnering 3.2% of the vote. The Times predicted that the 1997 race would be one of "costliest and closest" in the state, with the gubernatorial election that year between Democrat Jim McGreevey and Republican Christine Todd Whitman having a strong effect on the race. Dalton was expected to benefit from the name recognition of his brother, Daniel Dalton, who had served as Secretary of State of New Jersey and had represented the district in the State Senate.

In 2002, Sean F. Dalton was appointed as Gloucester County Prosecutor. In 2007, he was reappointed by Governor Jon Corzine to a second five-year term.

In November 2017, after serving since 2012 on a holdover basis after his second five-year term ended, Dalton left office as Gloucester County Prosecutor, after Governor Chris Christie nominated Charles Fiore to fill the position. Serving over 15 years, he was the longest serving county prosecutor in Gloucester County history. He resigned from office in late November after having obtained a position as an Assistant Attorney General of New Jersey. In that capacity, he worked on the implementation of the state's legalization of recreational cannabis. He later joined the law firm of Cooper Levenson, working of counsel in their Atlantic City office.
