= Stephen Altamuro =

American politician

Member of the New Jersey General Assembly from the 4th district
- In office June 5, 2003 – January 13, 2004 Serving with Robert J. Smith II
- Preceded by: George Geist
- Succeeded by: David R. Mayer

Personal details
- Born: June 28, 1960 (age 66)
- Party: Democratic (2009–present)
- Other political affiliations: Republican (before 2009)
- Education: Temple University (BA); Widener University (JD)

Stephen Altamuro (born June 28, 1960) is an American politician who served in the New Jersey General Assembly from the 4th Legislative District from 2003 to 2004. In addition to serving the Assembly, he previously served on the Washington Township Council. In 2003, Altamuro lost his reelection bid to serve a full term in the General Assembly. In 2009, he switched parties from Republican to Democrat. After serving in the Assembly, he was elected to the board of education of the Washington Township Public School District in 2010. He stepped down from the School Board in 2013.

Altamuro received his undergraduate degree in business administration from Temple University and his Juris Doctor degree from Widener University Delaware Law School. He became a member of the bars of New Jersey and Pennsylvania in 1985. He received discipline from the Supreme Court of New Jersey for representing a false signature as authentic to the Camden County Prosecutor's Office.

In 2023, Altamuro represented a local restaurant in Somers Point, New Jersey, over a trademark case with Taco Bell.
