= Mary Virginia Weber =

American politician

Member of the New Jersey General Assembly from the 4th Legislative District
- In office January 14, 1992 – January 11, 1994 Serving with George Geist
- Preceded by: Anthony S. Marsella; Ann A. Mullen
- Succeeded by: Sean F. Dalton

Personal details
- Born: October 22, 1927 Philadelphia, Pennsylvania
- Died: January 8, 2017 (aged 89) Washington Township, Gloucester County, New Jersey
- Party: Republican
- Education: Marywood College

Mary Virginia Weber (October 22, 1927 – January 8, 2017) was an American politician who served in the New Jersey General Assembly from the 4th Legislative District from 1992 to 1994. In addition to serving a single term there, she was a member of the Washington Township Council and a Gloucester County Freeholder. Prior to becoming an elected official, Weber was a kindergarten teacher in Claymont, Delaware.
