= Fred H. Madden =

Member of the New Jersey Senate

Fred Madden

Member of the New Jersey Senate from the 4th District
- In office January 13, 2004 – January 9, 2024
- Preceded by: George Geist
- Succeeded by: Paul D. Moriarty

Chairman of the New Jersey Senate Labor Committee
- In office 2009 – January 9, 2024

Personal details
- Born: March 30, 1954 (age 72)
- Party: Democratic
- Spouse: Patti
- Education: B.A. Rowan College of South Jersey (Law/Justice); M.S. St. Joseph's University (Criminal Justice)
- Occupation: Dean, Gloucester County Police Academy at Gloucester County College
- Website: Legislative website Senate Democrats Website

Fred H. Madden Jr. (born March 30, 1954) is an American Democratic Party politician, who has represented the 4th Legislative District in the New Jersey Senate from 2004 to 2024.

Madden announced in March 2023 that he would not be running for re-election and but would continue to serve until his term ended in January 2024.

== Early life and education ==
Madden is a 1972 graduate of Gloucester Catholic High School. Madden earned a degree in law enforcement from Camden County College, graduated with a B.A. from Glassboro State College (now Rowan College of South Jersey) in law / justice and was awarded an M.S. from Saint Joseph's University in criminal justice.

Madden served as acting superintendent of the New Jersey State Police in 2002, after rising through the ranks from trooper to lieutenant colonel. After he retired from the State Police force in 2002, he worked as the chief of investigations in the Gloucester County Prosecutor's Office. Madden received training at the FBI Academy and the United States Secret Service Dignitary Protection School. Under Madden's command, the New Jersey State Police established its Internet sex offender registry, a computer crimes initiative to combat identity theft and Internet crimes against children, and he served as a member of New Jersey's State Domestic Preparedness Task Force to address issues of homeland security and counter-terrorism.

Madden has taught as an adjunct professor at Seton Hall University, Rutgers University and Gloucester County College.

== New Jersey Senate ==
The Washington Township (Gloucester County) native was recruited to run for the Senate in the high-profile 4th Legislative District against incumbent Republican Senator George Geist in 2004. At the time, the campaign between Madden and Geist was the most expensive in New Jersey State Senate history reaching over $4.2 million, breaking the previous record spending of $1.8 million. After a recount, Madden held on to win with a 63-vote margin. Senator Madden was instrumental in passing the One-Gun-Month Bill, S1774. Madden, who previously voted "no" and committed to hold firm in that position in support of the constitutional right to keep and bear arms, switched his vote at the last minute and voted "yes" to limit firearms sales to one per month.

=== Committee assignments ===
In the current session, committee assignments are:

- Labor (as Chair)
- Health, Human Services and Senior Citizens (as Vice-Chair)
- Judiciary

== District 4 ==
Each of the 40 districts in the New Jersey Legislature has one representative in the New Jersey Senate and two members in the New Jersey General Assembly. The representatives from the 4th District for the 2022—2023 Legislative Session are:

- Senator Fred H. Madden (D)
- Assemblyman Paul D. Moriarty (D)
- Assemblywoman Gabriela Mosquera (D)

== Electoral history ==
=== New Jersey Senate ===
2021 New Jersey Senate election for the 4th Legislative District,
Party	Candidate	Votes	%	
Democratic	Fred Madden (Incumbent)	38,062	54.42	▼45.58
Republican	Stephen H. Pakradooni Jr.	31,878	45.58	▲45.58
Total votes		'69,940'	'100.0'	

2017 New Jersey Senate election for the 4th Legislative District
Party	Candidate	Votes	%	±%
Democratic	Fred Madden (Incumbent)	38,790	100.0	▲42.1
Total votes		'38,790'	'100.0'	

2013 New Jersey Senate election for the 4th Legislative District
Party	Candidate	Votes	%	
Democratic	Fred Madden (Incumbent)	29,439	57.9	▼4.2
Republican	Giancarlo D'Orazio	21,376	42.1	▲4.2
Total votes		'50,815'	'100.0'	

2011 New Jersey Senate election for the 4th Legislative District
Party	Candidate	Votes	%	±%
Democratic	Fred Madden (Incumbent)	23,868	62.1	▲2.3
Republican	Giancarlo D'Orazio	14,569	37.9	▼2.3
Total votes		'38,437'	'100.0'	

2007 New Jersey Senate election for the 4th Legislative District
Party	Candidate	Votes	%	
Democratic	Fred Madden (Incumbent)	21,395	59.8	▲9.7
Republican	Shelley Lovett	14,364	40.2	▼9.7
Total votes		'35,759'	'100.0'	

2003 New Jersey Senate election for the 4th Legislative District
Party	Candidate	Votes	%	
Democratic	Fred Madden	20,752	50.08	▲8.3
Republican	George Geist (Incumbent)	20,689	49.92	▼8.3
Total votes		'41,441'	'100.0'	

New Jersey Senate
Preceded by George Geist	Member of the New Jersey Senate from the 4th District; January 13, 2004–January 9, 2024	Succeeded by Paul D. Moriarty
