= Anthony S. Marsella =

American politician (born 1947)

Member of the New Jersey General Assembly from the 4th Legislative District
- In office January 12, 1982 – January 14, 1992 Serving with Dennis L. Riley and Ann A. Mullen
- Preceded by: Daniel Dalton
- Succeeded by: George Geist; Mary Virginia Weber

Personal details
- Born: December 13, 1947 (age 78) Woodbury, New Jersey, U.S.
- Party: Democratic

Anthony S. Marsella (born December 13, 1947) is an American politician who served in the New Jersey General Assembly from the 4th Legislative District from 1982 to 1992.
