= Domenick DiCicco =

American politician (1963–2024)

Member of the New Jersey General Assembly from the 4th district
- In office January 12, 2010 – January 10, 2012
- Preceded by: Sandra Love
- Succeeded by: Gabriela Mosquera

Personal details
- Born: January 24, 1963
- Died: January 19, 2024 (aged 60)
- Party: Republican
- Education: Pennsylvania State University

Domenick DiCicco Jr. (January 24, 1963 – January 19, 2024) was an American Republican Party politician who served in the New Jersey General Assembly from 2010 to 2012, where he represented the 4th Legislative District.

== Life and career ==
DiCicco served in the Assembly on the Commerce and Economic Development Committee and the Consumer Affairs Committee.

DiCicco received a B.A. in political science from Rowan University, an M.B.A. degree from Pennsylvania State University, and a J.D. degree from Delaware Law School (now Widener University School of Law). He was the executive vice president and general counsel of Alexander Gallo Holdings, LLC.

In 2009, DiCicco ran for the General Assembly seat vacated by Sandra Love, a Democrat. Running in a district where Democrats outnumber Republicans two to one, DiCicco defeated the Democratic candidate, local school board president William Collins, by a margin of 601 votes. He was sworn into office on January 12, 2010.

In the 2011 apportionment based on the results of the 2010 United States census, DiCicco was placed in the 3rd District where he faced Democratic incumbents John J. Burzichelli and Celeste Riley. Burzichelli (with 25,172 votes) and Riley (23,960) won re-election, defeating DiCicco (20,268) and his running mate Bob Villare (20,528) DiCicco's loss made his seat the only gain by the Democrats in the Assembly in the 2011 election cycle. His seat in the 4th District was filled by Gabriela Mosquera, a Democrat.

DiCicco resided in Franklin Township, Gloucester County. He died on January 19, 2024, at the age of 60.
