= George Geist =

American politician

Member of the New Jersey Senate from the 4th district
- In office May 28, 2003 – January 13, 2004
- Preceded by: John J. Matheussen
- Succeeded by: Fred H. Madden

Member of the New Jersey General Assembly from the 4th district
- In office January 14, 1992 – May 28, 2003 Serving with Mary Virginia Weber, Sean F. Dalton, Gerald Luongo and Robert J. Smith II
- Preceded by: Anthony S. Marsella; Ann A. Mullen
- Succeeded by: Stephen Altamuro

Personal details
- Born: June 18, 1955 (age 71) Pottsville, Pennsylvania, U.S.
- Party: Republican
- Education: Ursinus College (BA); Rutgers University (JD)

George F. Geist (born June 18, 1955) is an American Republican Party politician, who served in the New Jersey State Senate from 2003 to 2004, where he represented the 4th Legislative District. He had earlier served six terms in the General Assembly, from 1992 to 2003.

Geist was appointed in May 2003 to fill the Senate seat vacated by John J. Matheussen who had been appointed to head the Delaware River Port Authority. Geist served in the Senate as Deputy Republican Whip and served on the Judiciary committee and the State Government Committee. Geist lost to Democrat Fred H. Madden in 2004 in what was the most expensive in New Jersey State Senate history reaching over $4.2 million, breaking the previous record spending of $1.8 million. After a recount, Madden held on to win with a 63-vote margin. Geist received a B.A. from Ursinus College with a major in Political Science, and was awarded a J.D. from Rutgers University. Geist was a lawyer.
