= New Jersey's 4th legislative district =

American legislative district

- Senator: Paul D. Moriarty (D)
- Assembly members: Dan Hutchison (D); Cody Miller (D)
- Registration: 39.03% Democratic; 27.10% Republican; 32.62% unaffiliated
- Demographics: 63.7% White; 20.2% Black/African American; 0.3% Native American; 3.6% Asian; 0.0% Hawaiian/Pacific Islander; 5.0% Other race; 7.2% Two or more races; 10.7% Hispanic
- Population: 231,008
- Voting-age population: 181,075
- Registered voters: 176,864

New Jersey's 4th legislative district is one of 40 in the state. As of the 2021 apportionment, the district covers the Camden County municipalities of Chesilhurst, Gloucester Township, Waterford, and Winslow Township; the Gloucester County municipalities of Franklin Township, Monroe Township, Newfield Borough, and Washington Township; and the Atlantic County municipalities of Buena and Buena Vista.

== Demographic characteristics ==
As of the 2020 United States census, the district had a population of 231,008, of whom 181,075 (78.4%) were of voting age. The racial makeup of the district was 147,084 (63.7%) White, 46,758 (20.2%) African American, 751 (0.3%) Native American, 8,282 (3.6%) Asian, 61 (0.0%) Pacific Islander, 11,505 (5.0%) from some other race, and 16,567 (7.2%) from two or more races. Hispanic or Latino of any race were 24,822 (10.7%) of the population.

The district's percentage of people of Asian origin, the elderly and Hispanics are all below the state average, while the percentage of foreign-born residents was the second lowest in the state based on 2000 census data.

The district had 176,864 registered voters as of December 1, 2021, of whom 60,163 (34.0%) were registered as unaffiliated, 77,105 (43.6%) were registered as Democrats, 37,247 (21.1%) were registered as Republicans, and 2,349 (1.3%) were registered to other parties.

== Political representation ==
For the 2026–2027 session, the 4th legislative district of the New Jersey Legislature is represented in the State Senate by Paul D. Moriarty (D, Washington Township) and in the General Assembly by Dan Hutchison (D, Gloucester Township) and Cody Miller (D, Monroe Township).

The legislative district is almost entirely located within New Jersey's 1st congressional district.

== 1965-1973 ==
During the period of time after the 1964 Supreme Court decision in Reynolds v. Sims and before the establishment of a 40-district legislature in 1973, the 4th district consisted of all of Burlington County for the 1965 Senate election and a combination of Burlington and Ocean counties for the 1967, 1969, and 1971 Senate and Assembly elections.

In the 1965 election in which the senator was elected from voters from the entire district, incumbent Republican Senator from Burlington County Edwin B. Forsythe won re-election. For the 1967 Senate election for a four-year term which allowed for the election of two senators from the district, Senate candidates were nominated from each Assembly district. Republican William T. Hiering won from Assembly District 4A (consisting of all of Ocean County and rural eastern Burlington County) while Republican Forsythe won from District 4B, which consisted of the suburban remainder of Burlington. Forsythe was elected to Congress in 1970 and resigned on November 16, 1970 to take his seat there. Walter L. Smith Jr., a Republican Assemblyman, was elected to complete the remainder of Forsythe's term in a March 2, 1971 special election and was sworn in on March 15, 1971. In the 1971 general election for a two-year Senate term, again candidates were nominated by Assembly district (three districts in this instance). Republican John F. Brown won District 4A (most of Ocean County), Republican Barry T. Parker won from District 4B (Manchester, Berkeley townships and other small boroughs in Ocean County plus most of Burlington County), and Democrat Edward J. Hughes Jr. won from District 4C (suburban Burlington County).

For the Assembly elections held during this time, each district elected two members to the General Assembly. For the 1967 and 1969 elections, the Senate district was split into two districts and for the 1971 election, it was split into three. The members elected to the Assembly from each district are as follows:

| Session | District 4A | District 4B | District 4C |
|---|---|---|---|
| 1968–1969 | John F. Brown (R) | Walter L. Smith Jr. (R) | |
| 1968–1969 | Benjamin H. Mabie (R) | Barry T. Parker (R) | |
| 1970–1971 | John F. Brown (R) | Walter L. Smith Jr. (R) (Note: Resigned on March 15, 1971 after being elected to the Senate) | |
| 1970–1971 | Benjamin H. Mabie (R) | Barry T. Parker (R) | |
| 1972–1973 | Franklin H. Berry (R) | Benjamin H. Mabie (R) | Charles B. Yates (D) |
| 1972–1973 | James J. Mancini (R) | H. Kenneth Wilkie (R) | George H. Barbour (D) |

== Election history since 1973 ==
Upon the creation of a 40-district legislative map in 1973, the new 4th district consisted of portions of Gloucester County (Elk Township, Glassboro, Washington Township, and Deptford Township), Camden County stretching from Gloucester City southeast to Winslow Township, northeast to Chesilhurst and Waterford Township, and into Burlington County's Shamong Township and Tabernacle Township.

In 1979, James Florio, then a Congressman, encouraged Daniel Dalton and Dennis L. Riley to run in the June primary under the label of the "Florio Democratic Team" against three-term incumbents Kenneth A. Gewertz and Francis J. Gorman, who had the support of Angelo Errichetti and the Camden County Democratic Organization. Dalton (with 31.3% of the vote) and Riley (with 28.3%) won the two ballot spots in the primary balloting. Dalton and Riley were elected in the November 1979 general election

In the 1981 redistricting, the 4th consisted of southern Camden County (including Waterford, Winslow, and Gloucester townships, plus Chesilhurst, Lindenwold, and Laurel Springs), most of southeastern Gloucester County, and the Atlantic County municipalities of Buena, Buena Vista Township, and Folsom.

South Jersey Democratic Party leader George Norcross informed Riley in February 1989 that he would not get official party support in the June 1989 party primary for a sixth term, with Riley's ballot spot—and Assembly seat—to be handed over to Ann A. Mullen, who had worked as a legislative aide to Riley and was serving as mayor of Gloucester Township. Riley told The Press of Atlantic City that his decade of service in the Assembly had left him "fatigued" and that he felt relief from the weight that was removed from him by being replaced by Mullen, whom he publicly endorsed as his successor.

After years in which the district had been solidly Democratic, the Republican sweep in 1991 led to a period in which the district became what PolitickerNJ called the "#1 swing seat" in the state for more than a decade. The 1990s iteration of the district was composed of Gloucester Township, Lindenwold, and Laurel Springs in Camden County and a larger portion of southeastern Gloucester County. In the 1991 elections, attorney John J. Matheussen won the open seat of the departing incumbent Democrat Daniel J. Dalton who had left office to take the post of Secretary of State of New Jersey, having been nominated for the position by Governor of New Jersey James Florio. In the 1991 Assembly race George F. Geist and Mary Virginia Weber took the seat of incumbent Ann A. Mullen and her Democratic running mate Timothy D. Scaffidi.

Sean F. Dalton, won an Assembly seat in the 1993 election in a split verdict, with Republican George Geist coming in first, Dalton in second, incumbent Republican Mary Virginia Weber out of the money in third place and Dalton's running mate Sandra Love in fourth. Geist and Dalton were re-elected in 1995, with Democrat Chris Manganello in third and Republican Gerald Luongo in fourth. The $1 million spent by the candidates in the 1993 Assembly race was the most of any district in the state, and The New York Times predicted that the parties would spend heavily in the 1995 race as each side tries to gain both seats. Dalton ran in 1997, and lost, in a bid for the New Jersey Senate seat held by John J. Matheussen, with Matheussen taking 50.7% of the vote, Dalton receiving 46.1% and Jame E. Barber garnering 3.2% of the vote. With Dalton's seat open in the Assembly, Geist won re-election as did his running mate Gerald Luongo. With Luongo receiving negative press over what The New York Times called a "questionable land deal", Democrat Robert J. Smith II knocked off Luongo in the 1999 general election, while Geist was re-elected.

In the 2001 reapportionment, Elk Township and Clayton from the Gloucester portion of the district but more boroughs in central Camden County were added. Matheussen was nominated by Governor Jim McGreevey in February 2003 to head the Delaware River Port Authority. After Matheussen resigned from the Senate in May 2003 to take the post at the DRPA, his Senate seat was filled by Assemblyman George Geist. In turn, the Republicans named Stephen Altamuro to fill Geist's vacancy in the Assembly. In the 2003 elections, the Democrats swept all three legislative seats, with Fred H. Madden defeating Geist in the Senate, and David R. Mayer and Robert J. Smith II winning in the Assembly race, knocking off incumbent Altamuro.

The 2011 apportionment added Chesilhurst and Winslow Township, both from the 6th district. Municipalities that had been in the 4th district as part of the 2001 apportionment that were shifted out of the district as of 2011 are Franklin Township (Gloucester), Glassboro, and Newfield (all to the 3rd district). In the 2011 Assembly race, Democrat Gabriela Mosquera took the seat that had been held by Republican Domenick DiCicco, who had been shifted out of the district in the 2011 reapportionment. Democratic incumbent Paul D. Moriarty and Mosquera won the election, though Mosquera's victory was challenged based on her not having been a resident of the district for a full year. Her win was declared void leaving a vacancy in the seat. The local Democratic party committee selected Mosquera to fill the vacancy in March 2012 and she subsequently won a November 2012 special election.

== Election history ==
| Session | Senate | General Assembly | |
|---|---|---|---|
| 1974–1975 | Joseph A. Maressa (D) | Kenneth A. Gewertz (D) | Francis J. Gorman (D) |
| 1976–1977 | Joseph A. Maressa (D) | Kenneth A. Gewertz (D) | Francis J. Gorman (D) |
| 1978–1979 | Joseph A. Maressa (D) | Kenneth A. Gewertz (D) | Francis J. Gorman (D) |
| 1980–1981 | Joseph A. Maressa (D) | Daniel J. Dalton (D) | Dennis L. Riley (D) |
| 1982–1983 | Daniel J. Dalton (D) | Anthony S. Marsella (D) | Dennis L. Riley (D) |
| 1984–1985 | Daniel J. Dalton (D) | Anthony S. Marsella (D) | Dennis L. Riley (D) |
| 1986–1987 | Daniel J. Dalton (D) | Anthony S. Marsella (D) | Dennis L. Riley (D) |
| 1988–1989 | Daniel J. Dalton (D) | Anthony S. Marsella (D) | Dennis L. Riley (D) |
| 1990–1991 | Daniel J. Dalton (D) | Anthony S. Marsella (D) | Ann A. Mullen (D) |
| 1992–1993 | John J. Matheussen (R) | George Geist (R) | Mary Virginia Weber (R) |
| 1994–1995 | John J. Matheussen (R) | George Geist (R) | Sean F. Dalton (D) |
| 1996–1997 | John J. Matheussen (R) | George Geist (R) | Sean F. Dalton (D) |
| 1998–1999 | John J. Matheussen (R) | George Geist (R) | Gerald Luongo (R) |
| 2000–2001 | John J. Matheussen (R) | George Geist (R) | Robert J. Smith II (D) |
| 2002–2003 | John J. Matheussen (R) (Note: Resigned on May 28, 2003 to become head of the Delaware River Port Authority) | George Geist (R) (Note: Appointed to the Senate on May 28, 2003 to fill the unexpired term of John Matheussen) | Robert J. Smith II (D) |
| 2002–2003 | George Geist (R) | Stephen Altamuro (R) (Note: Appointed to the Assembly on June 5, 2003) | Robert J. Smith II (D) |
| 2004–2005 | Fred H. Madden (D) | David R. Mayer (D) | Robert J. Smith II (D) |
| 2006–2007 | Fred H. Madden (D) | David R. Mayer (D) | Paul D. Moriarty (D) |
| 2008–2009 | Fred H. Madden (D) | Sandra Love (D) | Paul D. Moriarty (D) |
| 2010–2011 | Fred H. Madden (D) | Domenick DiCicco (R) | Paul D. Moriarty (D) |
| 2012–2013 | Fred H. Madden (D) | Gabriela Mosquera (D) (Note: Was elected in the November 2011 general election but was not seated due to residency dispute, was appointed to the vacant seat by district Democrats and sworn in on March 5, 2012, won special election held in November 2012) | Paul D. Moriarty (D) |
| 2014–2015 | Fred H. Madden (D) | Gabriela Mosquera (D) | Paul D. Moriarty (D) |
| 2016–2017 | Fred H. Madden (D) | Gabriela Mosquera (D) | Paul D. Moriarty (D) |
| 2018–2019 | Fred H. Madden (D) | Gabriela Mosquera (D) | Paul D. Moriarty (D) |
| 2020–2021 | Fred H. Madden (D) | Gabriela Mosquera (D) | Paul D. Moriarty (D) |
| 2022–2023 | Fred H. Madden (D) | Gabriela Mosquera (D) | Paul D. Moriarty (D) |
| 2024–2025 | Paul D. Moriarty (D) | Dan Hutchison (D) | Cody Miller (D) |
| 2026–2027 | Paul D. Moriarty (D) | Dan Hutchison (D) | Cody Miller (D) |

== Election results, 1973–present ==
=== Senate ===
2021 New Jersey general election
| Party | Candidate | Votes | % | ±% |
|---|---|---|---|---|
| Democratic | Fred H. Madden | 38,062 | 54.4 | ▼45.6 |
| Republican | Stephen H. Pakradooni Jr. | 31,878 | 45.6 | N/A |
| Total votes | | 69,940 | 100.0 | |

New Jersey general election, 2017
| Party | Candidate | Votes | % | ±% |
|---|---|---|---|---|
| Democratic | Fred H. Madden | 38,790 | 100.0 | ▲42.1 |
| Total votes | | 38,790 | 100.0 | |

New Jersey general election, 2013
| Party | Candidate | Votes | % | ±% |
|---|---|---|---|---|
| Democratic | Fred H. Madden | 29,439 | 57.9 | ▼4.2 |
| Republican | Giancarlo D'Orazio | 21,376 | 42.1 | ▲4.2 |
| Total votes | | 50,815 | 100.0 | |

2011 New Jersey general election
| Party | Candidate | Votes | % |
|---|---|---|---|
| Democratic | Fred H. Madden | 23,868 | 62.1 |
| Republican | Giancarlo D'Orazio | 14,569 | 37.9 |
| Total votes | | 38,437 | 100.0 |

2007 New Jersey general election
| Party | Candidate | Votes | % | ±% |
|---|---|---|---|---|
| Democratic | Fred Madden | 21,395 | 59.8 | ▲9.7 |
| Republican | Shelley Lovett | 14,364 | 40.2 | ▼9.7 |
| Total votes | | 35,759 | 100.0 | |

2003 New Jersey general election
| Party | Candidate | Votes | % | ±% |
|---|---|---|---|---|
| Democratic | Fred Madden | 20,752 | 50.08 | ▲8.3 |
| Republican | George F. Geist | 20,689 | 49.92 | ▼8.3 |
| Total votes | | 41,441 | 100.0 | |

2001 New Jersey general election1
| Party | Candidate | Votes | % |
|---|---|---|---|
| Republican | John J. Matheussen | 28,530 | 58.2 |
| Democratic | Joseph L. Manganello | 20,451 | 41.8 |
| Total votes | | 48,981 | 100.0 |

1997 New Jersey general election
| Party | Candidate | Votes | % | ±% |
|---|---|---|---|---|
| Republican | John J. Matheussen | 29,429 | 50.7 | ▼3.6 |
| Democratic | Sean F. Dalton | 26,780 | 46.1 | ▲0.4 |
| Conservative | Jim Barber | 1,872 | 3.2 | N/A |
| Total votes | | 58,081 | 100.0 | |

1993 New Jersey general election
| Party | Candidate | Votes | % | ±% |
|---|---|---|---|---|
| Republican | John J. Matheussen | 29,483 | 54.3 | ▲2.6 |
| Democratic | Bernard "Ben" Lynch | 24,799 | 45.7 | ▼2.6 |
| Total votes | | 54,282 | 100.0 | |

1991 New Jersey general election
| Party | Candidate | Votes | % |
|---|---|---|---|
| Republican | John J. Matheussen | 21,553 | 51.7 |
| Democratic | Anthony S. Marsella | 20,118 | 48.3 |
| Total votes | | 41,671 | 100.0 |

1987 New Jersey general election
| Party | Candidate | Votes | % | ±% |
|---|---|---|---|---|
| Democratic | Daniel J. Dalton | 24,574 | 58.9 | ▼5.0 |
| Republican | William F. Thomson | 17,148 | 41.1 | ▲5.0 |
| Total votes | | 41,722 | 100.0 | |

1983 New Jersey general election
| Party | Candidate | Votes | % | ±% |
|---|---|---|---|---|
| Democratic | Daniel J. Dalton | 21,891 | 63.9 | ▲0.6 |
| Republican | Christopher Michaele | 12,379 | 36.1 | ▼0.6 |
| Total votes | | 34,270 | 100.0 | |

1981 New Jersey general election
| Party | Candidate | Votes | % |
|---|---|---|---|
| Democratic | Daniel J. Dalton | 32,386 | 63.3 |
| Republican | Frank B. Smith | 18,755 | 36.7 |
| Total votes | | 51,141 | 100.0 |

1977 New Jersey general election
| Party | Candidate | Votes | % | ±% |
|---|---|---|---|---|
| Democratic | Joseph A. Maressa | 35,736 | 65.0 | ▲1.2 |
| Republican | Walter C. Gebelein | 19,248 | 35.0 | ▼1.2 |
| Total votes | | 54,984 | 100.0 | |

1973 New Jersey general election
| Party | Candidate | Votes | % |
|---|---|---|---|
| Democratic | Joseph A. Maressa | 31,729 | 63.8 |
| Republican | Thomas E. Jenkins | 18,012 | 36.2 |
| Total votes | | 49,741 | 100.0 |

=== General Assembly ===
2021 New Jersey general election
| Party | Candidate | Votes | % | ±% |
|---|---|---|---|---|
| Democratic | Paul D. Moriarty | 36,480 | 26.5 | ▼3.4 |
| Democratic | Gabriela M. Mosquera | 35,561 | 25.8 | ▼3.6 |
| Republican | Patricia Kline | 32,403 | 23.5 | ▲2.5 |
| Republican | Denise Gonzalez | 32,025 | 23.3 | ▲3.6 |
| Libertarian | Nicholas Magner | 1,218 | 0.9 | N/A |
| Total votes | | 137,687 | 100.0 | |

2019 New Jersey general election
| Party | Candidate | Votes | % | ±% |
|---|---|---|---|---|
| Democratic | Paul D. Moriarty | 23,179 | 29.9 | ▼2.3 |
| Democratic | Gabriela M. Mosquera | 22,739 | 29.4 | ▼1.8 |
| Republican | Paul E. Dilks | 16,227 | 21.0 | ▲3.0 |
| Republican | Stephen H. Pakradooni Jr. | 15,250 | 19.7 | ▲2.3 |
| Total votes | | 77,395 | 100.0 | |

New Jersey general election, 2017
| Party | Candidate | Votes | % | ±% |
|---|---|---|---|---|
| Democratic | Paul D. Moriarty | 32,892 | 32.2 | ▲1.8 |
| Democratic | Gabriela M. Mosquera | 31,800 | 31.2 | ▲1.3 |
| Republican | Patricia Jefferson Kline | 18,386 | 18.0 | ▼2.2 |
| Republican | Eduardo J. Maldonado | 17,761 | 17.4 | ▼2.0 |
| Represent, Not Rule | William McCauley Jr. | 1,194 | 1.2 | N/A |
| Total votes | | 102,033 | 100.0 | |

New Jersey general election, 2015
| Party | Candidate | Votes | % | ±% |
|---|---|---|---|---|
| Democratic | Paul D. Moriarty | 17,454 | 30.4 | ▲1.4 |
| Democratic | Gabriela M. Mosquera | 17,147 | 29.9 | ▲2.3 |
| Republican | Kevin P. Murphy | 11,592 | 20.2 | ▼1.9 |
| Republican | Jack Nicholson | 11,131 | 19.4 | ▼2.0 |
| Total votes | | 57,324 | 100.0 | |

New Jersey general election, 2013
| Party | Candidate | Votes | % | ±% |
|---|---|---|---|---|
| Democratic | Paul D. Moriarty | 28,527 | 29.0 | ▼1.0 |
| Democratic | Gabriela M. Mosquera | 27,095 | 27.6 | ▼0.7 |
| Republican | Philip Dieser | 21,702 | 22.1 | ▲2.2 |
| Republican | Theodore M. Liddell | 20,998 | 21.4 | ▲2.0 |
| Total votes | | 98,322 | 100.0 | |

Special election, November 6, 2012
| Party | Candidate | Votes | % |
|---|---|---|---|
| Democratic | Gabriela M. Mosquera | 55,027 | 60.6 |
| Republican | Shelley Lovett | 35,835 | 39.4 |
| Total votes | | 90,862 | 100.0 |

New Jersey general election, 2011
| Party | Candidate | Votes | % |
|---|---|---|---|
| Democratic | Paul D. Moriarty | 22,734 | 30.0 |
| Democratic | Gabriela Mosquera | 21,461 | 28.3 |
| Republican | Shelley Lovett | 15,106 | 19.9 |
| Republican | Patricia Fratticcioli | 14,725 | 19.4 |
| Family, Freedom, Community | Tony Celeste | 1,843 | 2.4 |
| Total votes | | 75,869 | 100.0 |

New Jersey general election, 2009
| Party | Candidate | Votes | % | ±% |
|---|---|---|---|---|
| Democratic | Paul D. Moriarty | 28,680 | 26.3 | ▼1.5 |
| Republican | Domenick DiCicco | 27,408 | 25.2 | ▲2.7 |
| Democratic | William Collins | 26,807 | 24.6 | ▼3.3 |
| Republican | Eugene E. T. Lawrence | 26,027 | 23.9 | ▲2.0 |
| Total votes | | 108,922 | 100.0 | |

New Jersey general election, 2007
| Party | Candidate | Votes | % | ±% |
|---|---|---|---|---|
| Democratic | Sandra Love | 19,429 | 27.9 | ▼3.9 |
| Democratic | Paul D. Moriarty | 19,357 | 27.8 | ▼4.0 |
| Republican | Patricia Fratticcioli | 15,656 | 22.5 | ▲3.7 |
| Republican | Agnes Gardiner | 15,238 | 21.9 | ▲4.4 |
| Total votes | | 69,680 | 100.0 | |

New Jersey general election, 2005
| Party | Candidate | Votes | % | ±% |
|---|---|---|---|---|
| Democratic | Paul D. Moriarty | 31,976 | 31.8 | ▲4.5 |
| Democratic | David R. Mayer | 31,948 | 31.8 | ▲4.8 |
| Republican | Frank Winters | 18,908 | 18.8 | ▼4.1 |
| Republican | Corey Ahart | 17,597 | 17.5 | ▼5.4 |
| Total votes | | 100,429 | 100.0 | |

New Jersey general election, 2003
| Party | Candidate | Votes | % | ±% |
|---|---|---|---|---|
| Democratic | Robert Smith | 22,256 | 27.3 | ▲1.4 |
| Democratic | David R. Mayer | 21,965 | 27.0 | ▲2.2 |
| Republican | Patrick M. Dougherty | 18,641 | 22.9 | ▼5.1 |
| Republican | Stephen Altamuro | 18,636 | 22.9 | ▲1.6 |
| Total votes | | 81,498 | 100.0 | |

New Jersey general election, 2001
| Party | Candidate | Votes | % |
|---|---|---|---|
| Republican | George F. Geist | 26,825 | 28.0 |
| Democratic | Robert J. Smith | 24,845 | 25.9 |
| Democratic | David F. Carlamere | 23,729 | 24.8 |
| Republican | Sherie Y. Jenkins | 20,428 | 21.3 |
| Total votes | | 95,827 | 100.0 |

New Jersey general election, 1999
| Party | Candidate | Votes | % | ±% |
|---|---|---|---|---|
| Republican | George F. Geist | 19,694 | 27.2 | ▲1.4 |
| Democratic | Robert J. Smith | 18,823 | 26.0 | ▲2.8 |
| Democratic | David Carlamere | 17,422 | 24.0 | ▲2.4 |
| Republican | Gerald J. Luongo | 16,502 | 22.8 | ▼1.5 |
| Total votes | | 72,441 | 100.0 | |

New Jersey general election, 1997
| Party | Candidate | Votes | % | ±% |
|---|---|---|---|---|
| Republican | George F. Geist | 28,114 | 25.8 | ▲0.2 |
| Republican | Gerald J. Luongo | 26,535 | 24.3 | ▲3.4 |
| Democratic | Anthony S. Marsella | 25,310 | 23.2 | ▼2.6 |
| Democratic | John "Jack" Luby | 23,538 | 21.6 | ▼1.2 |
| Conservative | J. Edw. Gormley | 3,213 | 2.9 | ▲0.3 |
| Conservative | Cynthia A. Merckx | 2,394 | 2.2 | 0.0 |
| Total votes | | 109,104 | 100.0 | |

New Jersey general election, 1995
| Party | Candidate | Votes | % | ±% |
|---|---|---|---|---|
| Democratic | Sean F. Dalton | 18,219 | 25.8 | ▲0.8 |
| Republican | George F. Geist | 18,082 | 25.6 | ▲0.6 |
| Democratic | Chris Manganello | 16,114 | 22.8 | ▼0.9 |
| Republican | Gerald J. Luongo | 14,769 | 20.9 | ▼3.4 |
| Conservative | Tom Dooley | 1,816 | 2.6 | N/A |
| Conservative | Carol Dooley | 1,573 | 2.2 | N/A |
| Total votes | | 70,573 | 100.0 | |

New Jersey general election, 1993
| Party | Candidate | Votes | % | ±% |
|---|---|---|---|---|
| Republican | George F. Geist | 26,428 | 25.0 | ▼0.2 |
| Democratic | Sean F. Dalton | 26,366 | 25.0 | ▲0.2 |
| Republican | Mary Virginia "Ginny" Weber | 25,667 | 24.3 | ▼1.9 |
| Democratic | Sandra L. Love | 25,046 | 23.7 | ▼0.1 |
| United We Stand | Kirk Errickson | 2,061 | 2.0 | N/A |
| Total votes | | 105,568 | 100.0 | |

1991 New Jersey general election
| Party | Candidate | Votes | % |
|---|---|---|---|
| Republican | Mary Virginia "Ginny" Weber | 21,262 | 26.2 |
| Republican | George F. Geist | 20,455 | 25.2 |
| Democratic | Ann A. Mullen | 20,143 | 24.8 |
| Democratic | Timothy D. Scaffidi | 19,285 | 23.8 |
| Total votes | | 81,145 | 100.0 |

1989 New Jersey general election
| Party | Candidate | Votes | % | ±% |
|---|---|---|---|---|
| Democratic | Anthony S. Marsella | 36,248 | 32.2 | ▲4.4 |
| Democratic | Ann A. Mullen | 34,967 | 31.0 | ▲3.6 |
| Republican | Phil Donohue | 21,486 | 19.1 | ▼3.4 |
| Republican | Frank J. Reed III | 19,916 | 17.7 | ▼4.6 |
| Total votes | | 112,617 | 100.0 | |

1987 New Jersey general election
| Party | Candidate | Votes | % | ±% |
|---|---|---|---|---|
| Democratic | Anthony S. Marsella | 22,942 | 27.8 | ▲0.5 |
| Democratic | Dennis L. Riley | 22,676 | 27.4 | ▲0.6 |
| Republican | Wayne S. Wooster | 18,615 | 22.5 | ▼0.6 |
| Republican | John Matheussen | 18,408 | 22.3 | ▼0.5 |
| Total votes | | 82,641 | 100.0 | |

1985 New Jersey general election
| Party | Candidate | Votes | % | ±% |
|---|---|---|---|---|
| Democratic | Anthony S. Marsella | 23,162 | 27.3 | ▼3.4 |
| Democratic | Dennis L. Riley | 22,703 | 26.8 | ▼3.4 |
| Republican | Frank F. Senatore | 19,621 | 23.1 | ▲2.8 |
| Republican | William F. Thomson | 19,307 | 22.8 | ▲3.9 |
| Total votes | | 84,793 | 100.0 | |

New Jersey general election, 1983
| Party | Candidate | Votes | % | ±% |
|---|---|---|---|---|
| Democratic | Anthony S. Marsella | 20,602 | 30.7 | ▼0.1 |
| Democratic | Dennis L. Riley | 20,278 | 30.2 | ▼0.4 |
| Republican | Jacqueline Clark | 13,627 | 20.3 | ▲0.8 |
| Republican | Ronald L. Passarella | 12,663 | 18.9 | ▼0.2 |
| Total votes | | 67,170 | 100.0 | |

New Jersey general election, 1981
| Party | Candidate | Votes | % |
|---|---|---|---|
| Democratic | Anthony S. Marsella | 30,792 | 30.8 |
| Democratic | Dennis L. Riley | 30,621 | 30.6 |
| Republican | John Votta | 19,450 | 19.5 |
| Republican | Richard A. Stumpf | 19,103 | 19.1 |
| Total votes | | 99,966 | 100.0 |

New Jersey general election, 1979
| Party | Candidate | Votes | % | ±% |
|---|---|---|---|---|
| Democratic | Daniel J. Dalton | 26,229 | 29.7 | ▼2.9 |
| Democratic | Dennis L. Riley | 26,024 | 29.4 | ▼2.2 |
| Republican | Frederick A. Busch | 18,080 | 20.5 | ▲1.9 |
| Republican | Mark J. Haas | 18,035 | 20.4 | ▲3.2 |
| Total votes | | 88,368 | 100.0 | |

New Jersey general election, 1977
| Party | Candidate | Votes | % | ±% |
|---|---|---|---|---|
| Democratic | Kenneth A. Gewertz | 34,657 | 32.6 | ▲0.5 |
| Democratic | Francis J. Gorman | 33,613 | 31.6 | ▲1.4 |
| Republican | Paul J. Tully | 19,763 | 18.6 | ▼0.5 |
| Republican | Lino C. Bernardi | 18,325 | 17.2 | ▼1.3 |
| Total votes | | 106,358 | 100.0 | |

New Jersey general election, 1975
| Party | Candidate | Votes | % | ±% |
|---|---|---|---|---|
| Democratic | Kenneth A. Gewertz | 29,451 | 32.1 | ▼0.1 |
| Democratic | Francis J. Gorman | 27,711 | 30.2 | ▼1.4 |
| Republican | Frank B. Smith | 17,569 | 19.1 | ▲1.3 |
| Republican | John F. Henderson | 17,019 | 18.5 | ▲0.2 |
| Total votes | | 91,750 | 100.0 | |

New Jersey general election, 1973
| Party | Candidate | Votes | % |
|---|---|---|---|
| Democratic | Kenneth A. Gewertz | 31,355 | 32.2 |
| Democratic | Francis J. Gorman | 30,765 | 31.6 |
| Republican | Anthony P. Costa | 17,794 | 18.3 |
| Republican | Frank B. Smith | 17,349 | 17.8 |
| Total votes | | 97,263 | 100.0 |

== Election results, 1965–1973 ==
=== Senate ===
==== District 4 At-large ====
1965 New Jersey general election
| Party | Candidate | Votes | % |
|---|---|---|---|
| Republican | Edwin B. Forsythe | 34,098 | 52.6 |
| Democratic | George H. Barbour | 30,617 | 47.2 |
| Socialist Labor | Bernardo S. Doganiero | 108 | 0.2 |
| Total votes | | 64,823 | 100.0 |

==== District 4A ====
1967 New Jersey general election
| Party | Candidate | Votes | % |
|---|---|---|---|
| Republican | William T. Hiering | 35,639 | 71.1 |
| Democratic | Eugene E. Helbig | 14,505 | 28.9 |
| Total votes | | 50,144 | 100.0 |

1971 New Jersey general election
| Party | Candidate | Votes | % |
|---|---|---|---|
| Republican | John F. Brown | 30,272 | 53.4 |
| Democratic | John F. Russo | 26,378 | 46.6 |
| Total votes | | 56,650 | 100.0 |

==== District 4B ====
1967 New Jersey general election
| Party | Candidate | Votes | % |
|---|---|---|---|
| Republican | Edwin B. Forsythe | 30,930 | 55.7 |
| Democratic | Edward J. Hughes, Jr. | 24,359 | 43.9 |
| Socialist Labor | Bernardo S. Doganiero | 207 | 0.4 |
| Total votes | | 55,496 | 100.0 |

Special election, March 2, 1971
| Party | Candidate | Votes | % |
|---|---|---|---|
| Republican | Walter L. Smith | 10,389 | 60.4 |
| Democratic | Charles B. Yates | 6,798 | 39.6 |
| Total votes | | 17,187 | 100.0 |

1971 New Jersey general election
| Party | Candidate | Votes | % |
|---|---|---|---|
| Republican | Barry T. Parker | 22,929 | 62.5 |
| Democratic | Fred M. Detrick, Jr. | 13,737 | 37.5 |
| Total votes | | 36,666 | 100.0 |

==== District 4C ====
1971 New Jersey general election
| Party | Candidate | Votes | % |
|---|---|---|---|
| Democratic | Edward J. Hughes, Jr. | 24,043 | 51.1 |
| Republican | Walter L. Smith, Jr. | 22,580 | 48.0 |
| Socialist Labor | Bernardo S. Doganiero | 435 | 0.9 |
| Total votes | | 47,058 | 100.0 |

=== General Assembly ===
==== District 4A ====
New Jersey general election, 1967
| Party | Candidate | Votes | % |
|---|---|---|---|
| Republican | John F. Brown | 35,365 | 35.8 |
| Republican | Benjamin H. Mabie | 34,224 | 34.6 |
| Democratic | James L. Downing | 14,917 | 15.1 |
| Democratic | Gaetano J. Alaimo | 14,409 | 14.6 |
| Total votes | | 98,915 | 100.0 |

New Jersey general election, 1969
| Party | Candidate | Votes | % |
|---|---|---|---|
| Republican | John F. Brown | 54,561 | 33.3 |
| Republican | Benjamin H. Mabie | 53,606 | 32.8 |
| Democratic | Henry G. Tutek | 28,320 | 17.3 |
| Democratic | R. Bruce Veeder | 27,187 | 16.6 |
| Total votes | | 163,674 | 100.0 |

New Jersey general election, 1971
| Party | Candidate | Votes | % |
|---|---|---|---|
| Republican | Franklin H. Berry, Jr. | 28,665 | 26.2 |
| Republican | James J. Mancini | 27,672 | 25.3 |
| Democratic | Robert A. Gasser | 26,134 | 23.9 |
| Democratic | Frank J. McLaughlin | 25,788 | 23.6 |
| Independent | Bill Gahres | 1,193 | 1.1 |
| Total votes | | 109,452 | 100.0 |

==== District 4B ====
New Jersey general election, 1967
| Party | Candidate | Votes | % |
|---|---|---|---|
| Republican | Walter L. Smith, Jr. | 31,598 | 29.1 |
| Republican | Barry T. Parker | 31,396 | 29.0 |
| Democratic | Peter J. Casey, Jr. | 23,154 | 21.4 |
| Democratic | David Vechesky | 22,296 | 20.6 |
| Total votes | | 108,444 | 100.0 |

New Jersey general election, 1969
| Party | Candidate | Votes | % |
|---|---|---|---|
| Republican | Walter L. Smith, Jr. | 34,197 | 30.4 |
| Republican | Barry T. Parker | 33,984 | 30.2 |
| Democratic | Charles B. Yates | 23,862 | 21.2 |
| Democratic | John F. Lake | 20,314 | 18.1 |
| Socialist Labor | Bernardo S. Doganiero | 129 | 0.1 |
| Total votes | | 112,486 | 100.0 |

New Jersey general election, 1971
| Party | Candidate | Votes | % |
|---|---|---|---|
| Republican | Benjamin H. Mabie | 21,617 | 30.2 |
| Republican | H. Kenneth Wilkie | 21,491 | 30.0 |
| Democratic | Joseph P. Yeager | 15,078 | 21.0 |
| Democratic | Elmer D’Imperio | 13,453 | 18.8 |
| Total votes | | 71,639 | 100.0 |

==== District 4C ====
New Jersey general election, 1971
| Party | Candidate | Votes | % |
|---|---|---|---|
| Democratic | Charles B. Yates | 26,264 | 28.8 |
| Democratic | George H. Barbour | 23,924 | 26.2 |
| Republican | Harold L. Colburn | 21,297 | 23.4 |
| Republican | Wynn Kennedy | 19,655 | 21.6 |
| Total votes | | 91,140 | 100.0 |
