= Robert J. Smith II =

American politician

Member of the New Jersey General Assembly from the 4th Legislative District
- In office January 11, 2000 – January 10, 2006 Serving with George Geist and Stephen Altamuro
- Preceded by: Gerald Luongo
- Succeeded by: Paul D. Moriarty

Personal details
- Born: June 20, 1963 (age 63)
- Party: Democratic
- Education: Rutgers University (BA); Widener University (JD)

Robert J. Smith II (born June 20, 1963) is an American attorney and politician who served in the New Jersey General Assembly, representing the 4th Legislative District from 2000 to 2006. He was the Assistant Majority Whip from 2002 until he left office in 2006.

== Education ==
Smith graduated with a B.A. in 1989 from Rutgers University in Political Science and was awarded a J.D. in 1993 from the Widener University Delaware Law School.

== Career ==
Smith has served as Municipal Prosecutor for Elk, Logan, Monroe (Gloucester County), National Park, Washington Township (Gloucester County) and West Deptford. Smith served on the Gloucester County Board of Chosen Freeholders from 1998 to 2000. Smith served in the Assembly on the Agriculture and Natural Resources Committee (as Chair), Senior Issues Committee (as Vice Chair), the Financial Institutions and Insurance Committee, the Law and Public Safety Committee and also served on the Intergovernmental Relations Commission.

Smith did not seek reelection in 2005, and his seat was filled by fellow Democrat Paul D. Moriarty.
