= Benjamin H. Mabie =

American politician

Benjamin H. Mabie was an American politician who served in the New Jersey General Assembly for three terms and served as Mayor of Pine Beach, New Jersey.

In both 1967 and 1969, Mabie and John F. Brown were elected to represent District 4A in the New Jersey General Assembly; The district covered portions of Burlington County and Ocean County. In 1971, he was elected to a third two-year term together with his Republican running mate, H. Kenneth Wilkie, to represent District 4B.

In 1978, Mabie resigned from his seat as mayor of Pine Beach, a position that paid $500 a year, and retained a $6,000 post on the Ocean County, New Jersey Board of Elections; state laws prohibiting double dipping required Mabie to give up one of the positions.
