= Sandra Love =

American politician

Member of the New Jersey General Assembly from the 4th district
- In office January 8, 2008 – January 10, 2010
- Preceded by: David R. Mayer
- Succeeded by: Domenick DiCicco

Personal details
- Born: October 12, 1945
- Died: February 13, 2018 (aged 72)
- Party: Democratic
- Education: Eastern Michigan University
- Website: Assemblywoman Love's legislative web page at the Wayback Machine (archived December 23, 2008)

Sandra Love (October 12, 1945 – February 13, 2018) was an American Democratic Party politician, who served in the New Jersey General Assembly from January 8, 2008, to January 12, 2010, where she represented the 4th Legislative District.

Love served in the Assembly on the Commerce and Economic Development Committee and the Health and Senior Services Committee.

She was the Mayor of Gloucester Township, New Jersey from 1994 to 2006.

Love attended Eastern Michigan University, majoring in education, and Rowan University.

Love decided not to seek re-election in 2009, citing health issues.

Love died on February 13, 2018.
