= Ann A. Mullen =

American politician

Ann A. Mullen (October 24, 1935 – April 17, 1994) was an American politician who served as mayor of Gloucester Township, New Jersey and represented New Jersey's 4th legislative district in the New Jersey General Assembly.

Born in Philadelphia, Mullen was a graduate of John Bartram High School.

From Erial, Camden County, New Jersey, Mullen was a Democrat who served as mayor of Gloucester Township, New Jersey from 1979 until her death in 1994. From 1990 to 1992, Mullen also served in the New Jersey General Assembly. Mullen died at West Jersey Hospital in Marlton, New Jersey.
