= Albertson Brook =

Stream in New Jersey, USA

Albertson Brook Tributary to Nescochague Creek
- Location of Albertson Brook mouth Albertson Brook (the United States)

Location
- Country: United States
- State: New Jersey
- Counties: Atlantic; Camden

Physical characteristics
- Source: confluence of Blue Anchor Branch and Pump Branch
  - location: about 1 mile northeast of Elm, New Jersey
  - coordinates: 39°41′33″N 74°48′44″W
  - elevation: 76 ft (23 m)
- Mouth: Nescochague Creek
  - location: about 3 miles northeast of Hammonton, New Jersey
  - coordinates: 39°40′56″N 74°43′17″W
  - elevation: 33 ft (10 m)
- Length: 5.80 mi (9.33 km)
- Basin size: 20.25 square miles (52.4 km^{2})
- Discharge
  - location: Nescochague Creek
  - average: 26.84 cu ft/s (0.760 m^{3}/s) at mouth with Nescochague Creek

Basin features
- Progression: Nescochague Creek → Mullica River → Great Bay → Atlantic Ocean
- River system: Mullica River
- Tributaries
  - left: Pump Branch
  - right: Blue Anchor Branch
- Waterbodies: Paradise Lake
- Bridges: US 206

Albertson Brook, also called Albertsons Brook, is the name of Nescochague Creek upstream of the confluence with Great Swamp Brook in the southern New Jersey Pine Barrens in the United States.

Albertson Brook is near Hammonton, New Jersey, and flows for 6.3 miles (10.1 km) through Atlantic and Camden counties.

It has a drainage area of 17.1 square miles (44 km^{2}), of which nearly half is forest land, and the rest is split between urban and agricultural uses, both of which have tended to pollute the brook in the past.

It is formed by the confluence of the Pump Branch and Blue Anchor Brook.

== Tributaries ==
- Pump Branch
- Blue Anchor Brook

== See also ==
- List of New Jersey rivers
