= Pump Branch =

River in the United States of America

Coordinates: 39°42′24″N 74°52′49″W

The Pump Branch is a 7.7-mile-long (12.4 km) tributary of Albertson Brook in southern New Jersey in the United States.

The Pump Branch arises at Virginia Lake in Winslow.It flows beneath and alongside the former Atlantic City Railroad main line to the hamlet of Cedar Brook, where it turns east and is dammed to form Hobb Lake, in the vicinity of Bates Mill. Just downstream is another series of dams and lakes, built for the summer camp, Camp Haluwasa. Passing through Ancora, it joins with Blue Anchor Brook to form Albertson Brook.

== See also ==
- List of rivers of New Jersey
