= Ka'Lial Glaud =

American football player (born 1990)

No. 58
- Position: Linebacker

Personal information
- Born: November 9, 1990 (age 35); Winslow Township, New Jersey, U.S.
- Listed height: 6 ft 2 in (1.88 m)
- Listed weight: 230 lb (104 kg)

Career information
- College: Rutgers
- NFL draft: 2013: undrafted

Career history
- Tampa Bay Buccaneers (2013–2014); Dallas Cowboys (2015)

Career NFL statistics
- Total tackles: 2
- Stats at Pro Football Reference

Ka'Lial Glaud (born November 9, 1990) is an American former professional football player who was a linebacker in the National Football League (NFL). Glaud played college football for the Rutgers Scarlet Knights.

== Early life ==
Raised in Winslow Township, New Jersey, Glaud graduated from Winslow Township High School and made his decision to attend the Rutgers University based on the results of a coin toss.

== Professional career ==
=== Tampa Bay Buccaneers ===
On May 6, 2013, Glaud was signed as an undrafted free agent by the Tampa Bay Buccaneers. He played there until 2015.

=== Dallas Cowboys ===
On August 3, 2015, he was signed as a free agent by the Dallas Cowboys. On September 5, 2015, he was waived-injured by the Cowboys. On the following day, he cleared waivers and was reverted to the Cowboys' injured reserve list. He spent the entire 2015 season on injured reserve with the Cowboys and was released in 2016 with an injured failed physical designation due to a concussion.
