= Logan Ryan =

American football player (born 1991)

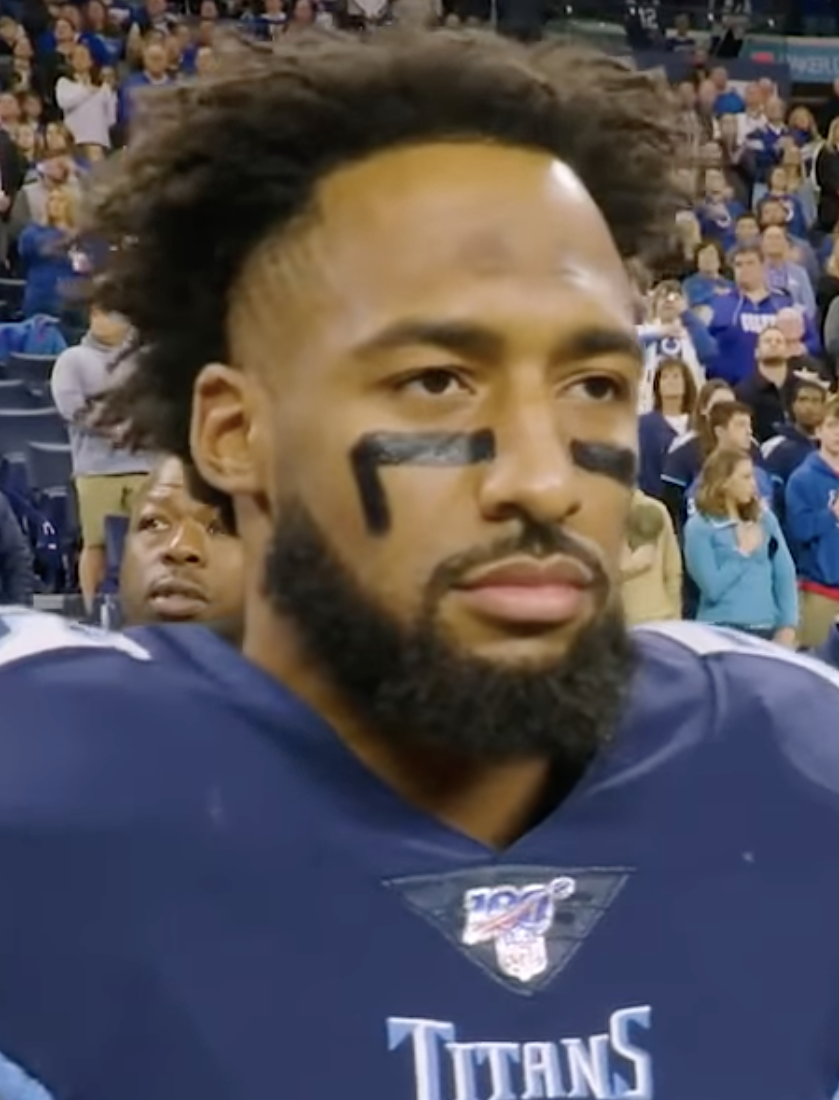
- Ryan with the Tennessee Titans in 2019

No. 26, 23, 33
- Positions: Cornerback, safety

Personal information
- Born: February 9, 1991 (age 35); Berlin, New Jersey, U.S.
- Listed height: 5 ft 11 in (1.80 m)
- Listed weight: 195 lb (88 kg)

Career information
- High school: Eastern Regional (Voorhees Township, New Jersey)
- College: Rutgers (2009–2012)
- NFL draft: 2013: 3rd round, 83rd overall pick

Career history
- New England Patriots (2013–2016); Tennessee Titans (2017–2019); New York Giants (2020–2021); Tampa Bay Buccaneers (2022); San Francisco 49ers (2023)

Awards and highlights
- 2× Super Bowl champion (XLIX, LI); First-team All-American (2012); First-team All-Big East (2012); Second-team All-Big East (2011)

Career NFL statistics
- Total tackles: 755
- Sacks: 13.0
- Pass deflections: 98
- Interceptions: 19
- Forced fumbles: 15
- Fumble recoveries: 4
- Touchdowns: 1
- Stats at Pro Football Reference

Logan Daniel Ryan (born February 9, 1991) is an American former professional football player who was a defensive back in the National Football League (NFL) for 11 seasons. He played college football for the Rutgers Scarlet Knights as a cornerback and was selected by the New England Patriots in the third round of the 2013 NFL draft. Ryan also played for the Tennessee Titans, New York Giants, Tampa Bay Buccaneers, and San Francisco 49ers. He played cornerback for the first seven seasons of his career before switching to safety in 2020 and playing the position in his last four seasons. Since retiring from playing, Ryan has worked as an NFL analyst for CBS television broadcasts.

== Early life ==
A native of Berlin, New Jersey, Ryan attended Eastern Regional High School in Voorhees, New Jersey, and played for the Eastern Vikings high school football team. He was an all-state selection at both cornerback and quarterback. Regarded as a four-star recruit by Rivals.com, Ryan was ranked the No. 32 cornerback prospect in his class.

== College career ==
Ryan played for the Rutgers Scarlet Knights football team. He was a second-team All-Big East Conference selection as a sophomore in 2011 and was a first-team All-Big East selection as a junior in 2012.

Ryan was also named a first-team All-American by Pro Football Weekly in 2012.

On December 31, 2012, Ryan announced that he would forgo his senior year at Rutgers and declared for the 2013 NFL draft.

== Professional career ==
=== Pre-draft ===
Coming out of Rutgers, Ryan was projected to be a third-round draft pick by the majority of NFL draft experts and scouts. He attended the NFL Combine and completed all of the required combine and positional drills. On March 13, 2013, Ryan participated at Rutgers' pro day along with Marcus Cooper, Duron Harmon, Steve Beauharnais, Mark Harrison, Brandon Jones, Jawan Jamison, Khaseem Greene, and seven others. NFLDraftScout.com ranked him the 13th best cornerback prospect in the draft.

External videos
- Logan Ryan's NFL Combine Workout

Pre-draft measurables
Height	Weight	Arm length	Hand span	Wingspan	40-yard dash	10-yard split	20-yard split	20-yard shuttle	Three-cone drill	Vertical jump	Broad jump	Bench press
5 ft 11 1/8 in (1.81 m)	191 lb (87 kg)	31 3/8 in (0.80 m)	9 5/8 in (0.24 m)	6 ft 4 3/4 in (1.95 m)	4.56 s	1.58 s	2.65 s	4.06 s	6.69 s	32.5 in (0.83 m)	9 ft 8 in (2.95 m)	14 reps
All values from NFL Combine

=== New England Patriots ===
==== 2013 season ====
The New England Patriots selected Ryan in the third round (83rd overall) of the 2013 NFL draft. He was the 14th cornerback drafted in 2013. On May 16, 2013, Ryan signed a four-year, $2.77 million contract that included a signing bonus of $563,252.

Ryan competed for a starting cornerback job behind Alfonzo Dennard, Aqib Talib, Kyle Arrington, and Ras-I Dowling. Head coach Bill Belichick named Ryan the fourth cornerback on the Patriots' depth chart to begin the 2013 season, behind Dennard, Talib, and Arrington.

Ryan made his NFL debut in the narrow season-opening 23–21 victory over the Buffalo Bills but did not record any statistics. During Week 6 against the New Orleans Saints, Ryan made his first NFL start, yet recorded no statistics in the 30–27 victory. In the next game against the New York Jets, Ryan recorded four solo tackles, a pass deflection, and his first NFL interception off a pass from quarterback Geno Smith during the 30–27 overtime road loss. Ryan returned the interception for a 79-yard touchdown, marking the first of his career. The following week against the Miami Dolphins, Ryan had five combined tackles (four solo), a pass deflection, a forced fumble, and was credited with the first 1.5 sacks of his career after taking down Ryan Tannehill in the 27–17 victory.

During a Week 11 24–20 road loss to the Carolina Panthers on Monday Night Football, Ryan had a pass deflection. He was named the starter over Alfonzo Dennard for the next game against the Denver Broncos, who had been battling a knee injury. Ryan finished the 34–31 comeback victory with four combined tackles (three solo), a pass deflection, and an interception off a pass thrown by Peyton Manning. The following week against the Houston Texans, Ryan started in place of Dennard, who was inactive, and recorded three solo tackles, two pass deflections, and intercepted a pass attempt by Case Keenum during the 34–31 road victory.

During Week 15 against the Dolphins, Ryan recorded two solo tackles and a pass deflection in the 24–20 road loss. In the next game against the Baltimore Ravens, he had a tackle, a season-high three pass deflections, and intercepted Joe Flacco twice during the 41–7 road victory.

Ryan finished his rookie year with 35 combined tackles (29 solo), 1.5 sacks, five interceptions, 10 pass deflections, and a forced fumble in 16 games and seven starts. The Patriots finished the atop the AFC East with a 12–4 record and earned a first-round bye in the playoffs. Ryan made his postseason debut in the Divisional Round against the Indianapolis Colts and recorded four solo tackles during the 43–22 victory. During the AFC Championship Game against the Broncos, Ryan had eight combined tackles (five solo) in the 26–16 road loss.

==== 2014 season ====
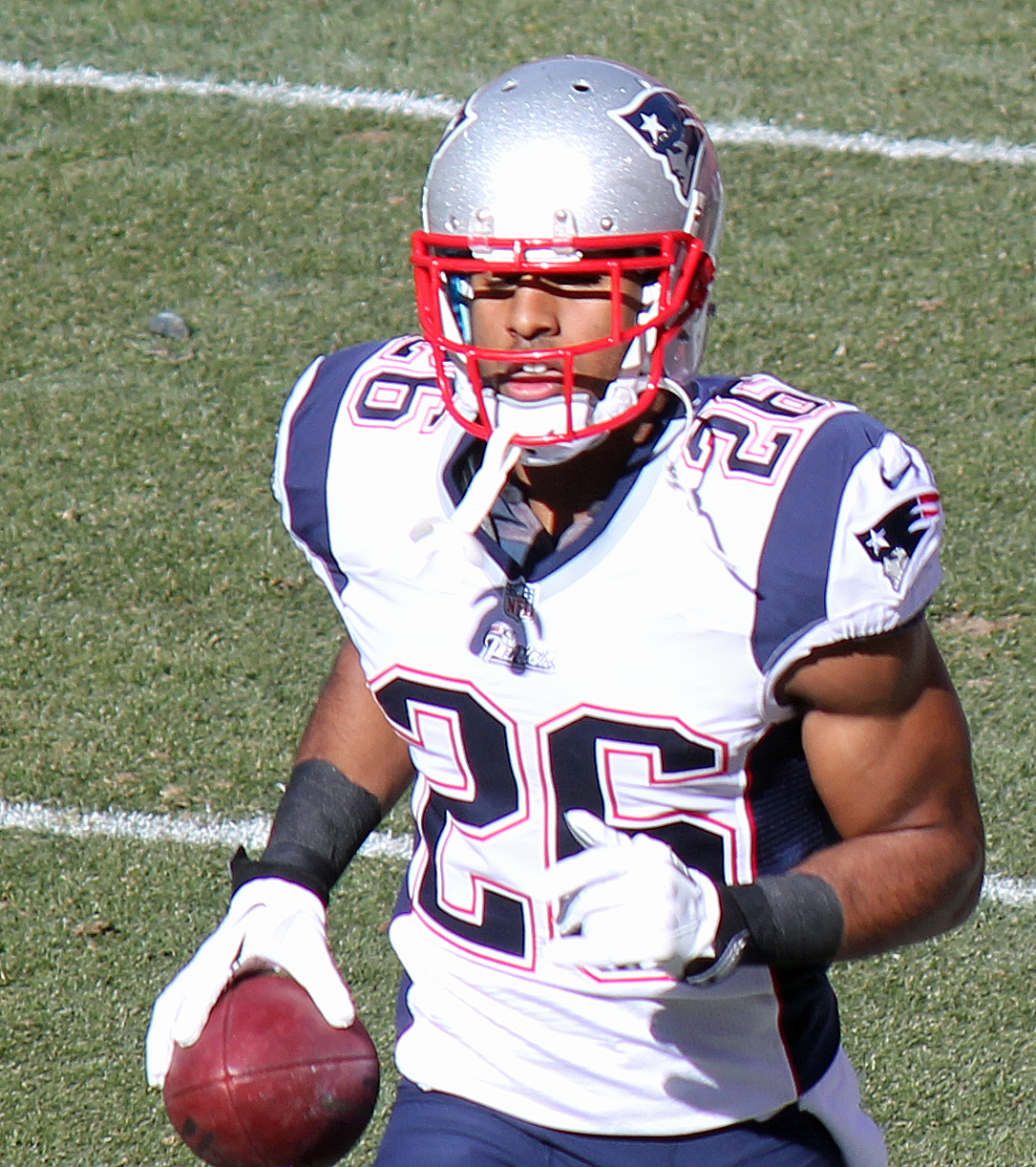
Ryan in 2014

Ryan competed against Alfonzo Dennard, Darrelle Revis, Kyle Arrington, and Brandon Browner for the vacant starting cornerback position left by the departure of Aqib Talib in free agency. Ryan was named the third cornerback on the Patriots' depth chart to begin the regular season.

During the season-opening 33–20 road loss to the Miami Dolphins, Ryan had a solo tackle and a forced fumble. In the next game against the Minnesota Vikings, he earned his first start of the season after Dennard was unable to play due to a shoulder injury. Ryan finished the 30–7 victory with three solo tackles, two pass deflections, and an interception off of Teddy Bridgewater. The following week against the Oakland Raiders, Ryan had a season-high four solo tackles and a pass deflection in the 16–9 victory.

During a Week 11 42–20 road victory over the Colts, Ryan had three combined tackles (two solo) and two pass deflections. In the next game against the Detroit Lions, he recorded a solo tackle, a pass deflection, and an interception off of Matthew Stafford during the 34–9 victory. During Week 16 against the Jets, Ryan had a season-high five combined tackles (three solo) in the narrow 17–16 road victory. He was named the starter for the regular season finale against the Bills after Alfonzo Dennard suffered a hamstring injury earlier in the week. Ryan finished the 17–9 loss tying his season-high of five combined tackles (two solo).

Ryan finished his second professional season with 42 combined tackles (29 solo), six pass deflections, two interceptions, and a forced fumble in 16 games and six starts. The Patriots finished atop the AFC East with a 12–4 record and earned a first-round bye in the playoffs. In the Divisional Round against the Ravens, Ryan had a solo tackle and a forced fumble during the 35–31 victory. During the AFC Championship Game against the Colts, he recorded two solo tackles in the 45–7 victory as the Patriots advanced to Super Bowl XLIX. In the Super Bowl against the Seattle Seahawks, Ryan had a solo tackle and a pass deflection during the 28–24 victory.

==== 2015 season ====
Ryan competed with Malcolm Butler, Justin Green, Bradley Fletcher, and Tarell Brown for the vacant starting cornerback positions throughout training camp after Darrelle Revis, Alfonzo Dennard, Kyle Arrington, and Brandon Browner left during the off season. Head coach Bill Belichick named Ryan the third cornerback on the depth chart behind Malcolm Butler and Tarell Brown to start the 2015 season.

During a Week 2 40–32 victory over the Bills, Ryan recorded four combined tackles (three solo), a pass deflection, and his first interception of the season off of Tyrod Taylor. The following week against the Jacksonville Jaguars, Ryan made his first start of the season after Tarell Brown was unable to play due to a foot injury. Ryan finished the 51–17 victory with four solo tackles. Two weeks later against the Dallas Cowboys, he had three combined tackles (two solo), a pass deflection, and an interception in the 30–6 road victory.

During Week 6 against the Colts, Ryan recorded a season-high nine combined tackles (six solo) and a pass deflection in the 34–27 road victory. After the game, he was named the indefinite starting cornerback for the rest of the season, replacing Tarell Brown who was placed on injured reserve. Two weeks later against the Dolphins on Thursday Night Football, Ryan had a team-high seven combined tackles (six solo), a pass deflection, and an interception in the 36–7 victory. In the next game against the Washington Redskins, he recorded six solo tackles, two pass deflections, and intercepted Kirk Cousins once during the 27–10 victory.

During a narrow Week 10 27–26 road victory over the New York Giants, Ryan had three solo tackles and a pass deflection. In the next game against the Bills on Monday Night Football, he tied his season-high of nine combined tackles (seven solo), which led the team, while also deflecting a pass during the 20–13 victory. The following week against the Broncos on Sunday Night Football, Ryan had four combined tackles (three solo) and four pass deflections in the 30–24 overtime road loss. During Week 14 against the Texans on Sunday Night Football, he recorded four combined tackles (one solo) and two pass deflections during the 27–6 road victory.

Ryan finished the 2015 season with 74 combined tackles (58 solo), a then career-high 14 pass deflections, and four interceptions in 16 games and 14 starts. The Patriots finished atop the AFC East with a 12–4 record and earned a playoff berth. In the Divisional Round against the Kansas City Chiefs, Ryan made his first NFL postseason start and recorded a team-high nine combined tackles (tied with Patrick Chung) during the 27–20 victory. During the AFC Championship Game against the Broncos, Ryan had five solo tackles and a pass deflection in the narrow 20–18 road loss.

==== 2016 season ====
Ryan was named the starting cornerback, alongside Malcolm Butler, for the second consecutive season.

During the season-opener against the Arizona Cardinals on Sunday Night Football, Ryan recorded six combined tackles (four solo) and a pass deflection in the narrow 23–21 road victory. In the next game against the Dolphins, he had seven solo tackles and a forced fumble during the 31–24 victory. The following week against the Texans on Thursday Night Football, Ryan recorded four combined tackles (three solo) and a pass deflection in the 27–0 shutout victory.

During a Week 4 16–0 shutout loss to the Bills, Ryan had a career-high 17 combined tackles (14 solo). He was delegated to the third cornerback on the depth chart for Weeks 7–8 after Eric Rowe emerged as the starter after being inactive for the first five games while rehabbing an ankle injury. During Week 11 against the San Francisco 49ers, Ryan was moved to starting nickelback after struggling against receivers as the starting outside cornerback while Rowe replaced starting outside cornerback as Ryan took over slot coverage duties from Patrick Chung. Ryan finished the 30–17 road victory with three combined tackles (two solo) and two pass deflections. In the next game against the Jets, he recorded a team-high seven combined tackles (five solo) and two pass deflections during the 22–17 road victory. Ryan developed into a viable starting nickelback and gave up only four receptions on 11 targets in Weeks 11 and 12.

During Week 13 against the Los Angeles Rams, Ryan had five solo tackles and his first NFL sack on Jared Goff in the 26–10 victory. Two weeks later against the Broncos, Ryan recorded seven solo tackles, a pass deflection, and intercepted Trevor Siemian once in the 16–3 road victory. Through Weeks 11–16, Ryan was called for one penalty and allowed no touchdown receptions and only 11 catches on 30 pass attempts. In the regular-season finale against the Dolphins, he had seven combined tackles (six solo), a pass deflection, and intercepted Ryan Tannehill once during the 35–14 road victory.

Ryan finished the 2016 season with 92 combined tackles (74 solo), 11 pass deflections, two interceptions, a sack, and a forced fumble in 16 games and 13 starts. He started six games as the outside cornerback with Malcolm Butler and started seven games as nickelback. The Patriots finished atop the AFC East with a 14–2 record and qualified for the playoffs. Ryan started at nickelback in the Divisional Round of the playoffs against the Texans and recorded seven combined tackles (four solo), three pass deflections, a sack, and intercepted a pass attempt by Brock Osweiler during the 34–16 victory. During the AFC Championship Game against the Pittsburgh Steelers, Ryan had a team-high nine combined tackles (eight solo) and a pass deflection in the 36–17 victory as the Patriots advanced to Super Bowl LI. In the Super Bowl against the Atlanta Falcons, he made the first Super Bowl start of his career and recorded six combined tackles (four solo) as the Patriots won 34–28 in overtime after trailing by 25 points in the third quarter.

=== Tennessee Titans ===
==== 2017 season ====
On March 10, 2017, the Tennessee Titans signed Ryan to a three-year, $30 million contract with $12 million guaranteed and a signing bonus of $2 million. He was named the starting cornerback, opposite Adoree' Jackson, to begin the regular season.

Ryan made his Titans debut in the season-opening 26–16 loss to the Raiders and recorded a solo tackle and forced fumble. Two weeks later against the Seahawks, Ryan had six combined tackles (five solo) and a season-high three pass deflections in the 33–27 victory.

During a Week 6 36–22 victory over the Colts on Monday Night Football, Ryan had three solo tackles and two pass deflections. Three weeks later against the Ravens, he recorded six combined tackles (four solo) and two pass deflections in the 23–20 victory. In the next game against the Cincinnati Bengals, Ryan had four combinee tackles (three solo) and a pass deflection during the 24–20 victory.

During Week 11 against the Steelers on Thursday Night Football, Ryan recorded a season-high eight combined tackles (six solo) and a pass deflection in the 40–17 road loss. Two weeks later against the Texans, he had six combined tackles (four solo) and two pass deflections before leaving the eventual 24–13 victory with a concussion.

Ryan finished his first season with the Titans with 62 combined tackles (50 solo), a forced fumble, and 11 pass deflections in 15 games and starts. The Titans finished second in the AFC South with a 9–7 record and qualified for the playoffs as the #5-seed. During the Wild Card Round against the Chiefs, Ryan had three solo tackles in the narrow 22–21 comeback road victory. In the Divisional Round against his former team, the New England Patriots, Ryan had a team-high 12 combined tackles (10 solo) during the 35–14 road loss.

==== 2018 season ====
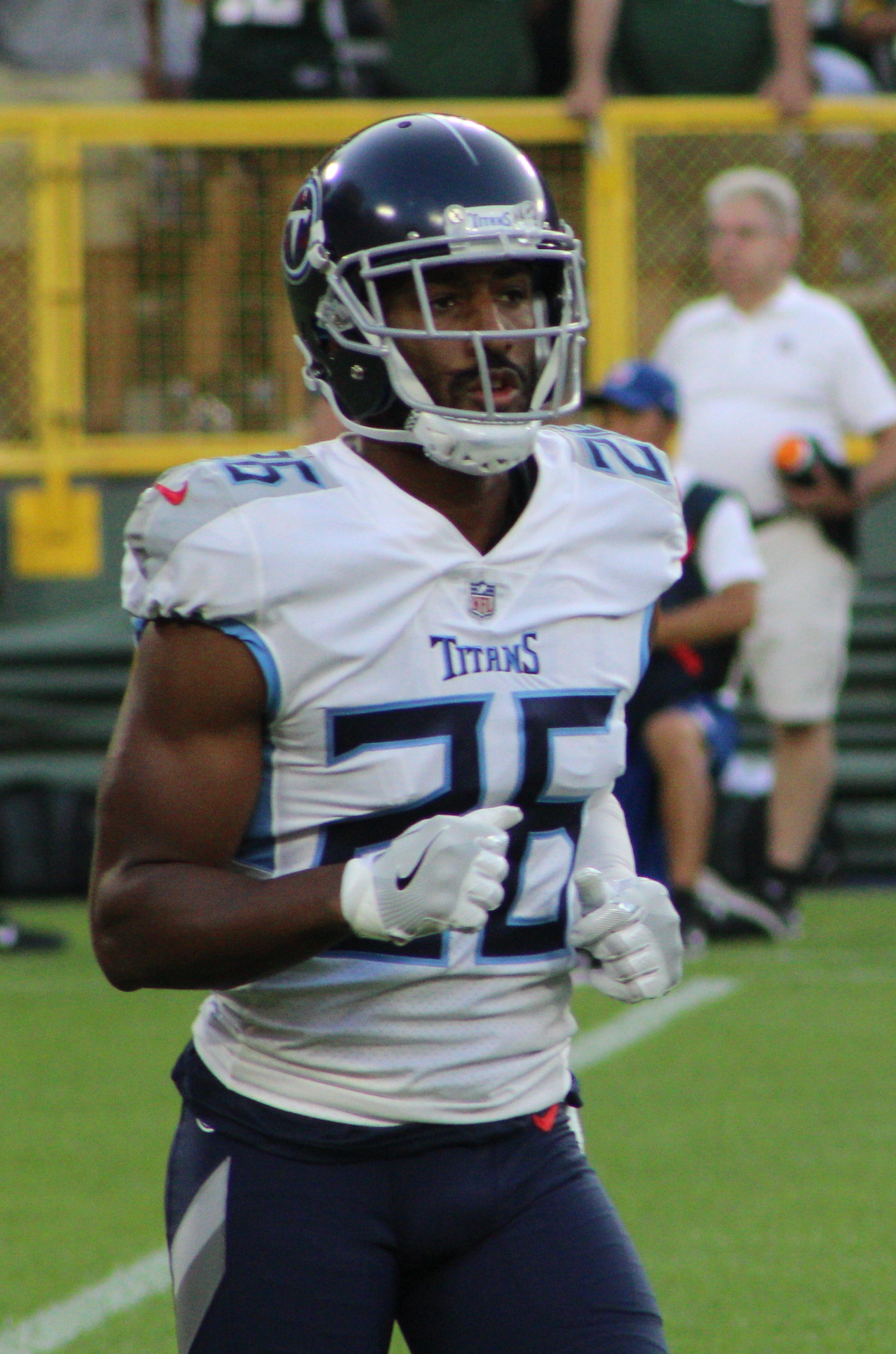
Ryan in 2018

Ryan entered the 2018 season as a starting cornerback alongside Adoree' Jackson and former Patriots teammate Malcolm Butler.

During a Week 2 20–17 victory over the Texans, Ryan had four solo tackles and sacked Deshaun Watson once. Two weeks later against the Philadelphia Eagles, Ryan recorded five combined tackles (four solo) and a pass deflection in the 26–23 overtime victory.

During Week 6 against the Ravens, Ryan recorded five combined tackles (three solo) and a pass deflection in the 21–0 shutout loss. In the next game against the Los Angeles Chargers in London, he had five solo tackles and two pass deflections during the narrow 20–19 loss. Three weeks later against his former team, the Patriots, Ryan recorded six combined tackles (five solo), a pass deflection, and a sack in the 34–10 victory.

During a Week 12 34–17 road loss to the Texans on Monday Night Football, Ryan had a team-high 11 combined tackles (five solo) and a sack. In the next game against the Jets, he recorded six combined tackles (four solo) and a pass deflection during the 26–22 comeback victory. The following week against the Jaguars on Thursday Night Football, he recorded seven combined tackles (five solo) and sacked Cody Kessler once in the 30–9 victory.

During Week 15 against the Giants, Ryan had two solo tackles and a sack before leaving the eventual 17–0 shutout road victory in the fourth quarter with a broken fibula. He was placed on injured reserve on December 18. Without Ryan, the Titans finished with a 9–7 record and missed out on the playoffs.

Ryan finished the 2018 season with 76 combined tackles (54 solo), eight pass deflections, and a then-career-high four sacks in 14 games and starts.

==== 2019 season ====
Ryan returned from his injury in time for the season-opener against the Cleveland Browns. Ryan finished the 43–13 road victory with eight combined tackles (seven solo), an interception, and 1.5 sacks on Baker Mayfield. In the next game against the Colts, Ryan had four combined tackles (one solo), two pass deflections, and intercepted former Patriots teammate Jacoby Brissett once during the narrow 19–17 loss. The following week against the Jaguars on Thursday Night Football, Ryan recorded a tackle and two pass deflections in the 20–7 road loss.

During Week 5 against the Bills, Ryan recorded a team-high nine combined tackles (seven solo) and sacked Josh Allen once in the 14–7 loss. In the next game against the Broncos, Ryan had five combined tackles (four solo) and a forced fumble during the 16–0 shutout road loss. The following week against the Chargers, he recorded eight combined tackles (five solo), a season-high three pass deflections, and a forced fumble in the 23–20 victory.

During a Week 8 27–23 victory over the Buccaneers, Ryan had eight combined tackles (six tackles), two pass deflections, strip-sacked Jameis Winston, and made the game-winning interception off of him. In the next game against the Panthers, Ryan recorded a team-high 10 combined tackles (three solo) and a pass deflection during the 30–20 road loss. The following week against the Chiefs, he led the team with a season-high 13 combined tackles (nine solo) and tied his season-high with three pass deflections in the 35–32 victory.

Following a Week 11 bye, the Titans faced the Jaguars. Ryan finished the 42–20 victory with four combined tackles (three solo) and a pass deflection. In the next game against the Colts, he recorded seven combined tackles (five solo), a pass deflection, and an interception during the 31–17 road victory. The following week against the Raiders, Ryan had a team-high nine combined tackles (three solo) in the 42–21 road victory.

During Week 15 against the Texans, Ryan recorded eight combined tackles (six solo) and a forced fumble in the 24–21 loss. In the next game against the Saints, he had seven solo tackles and a pass deflection during the 38–28 loss. During the regular-season finale against the Texans, Ryan recorded four solo tackles and a sack in the 35–14 road victory.

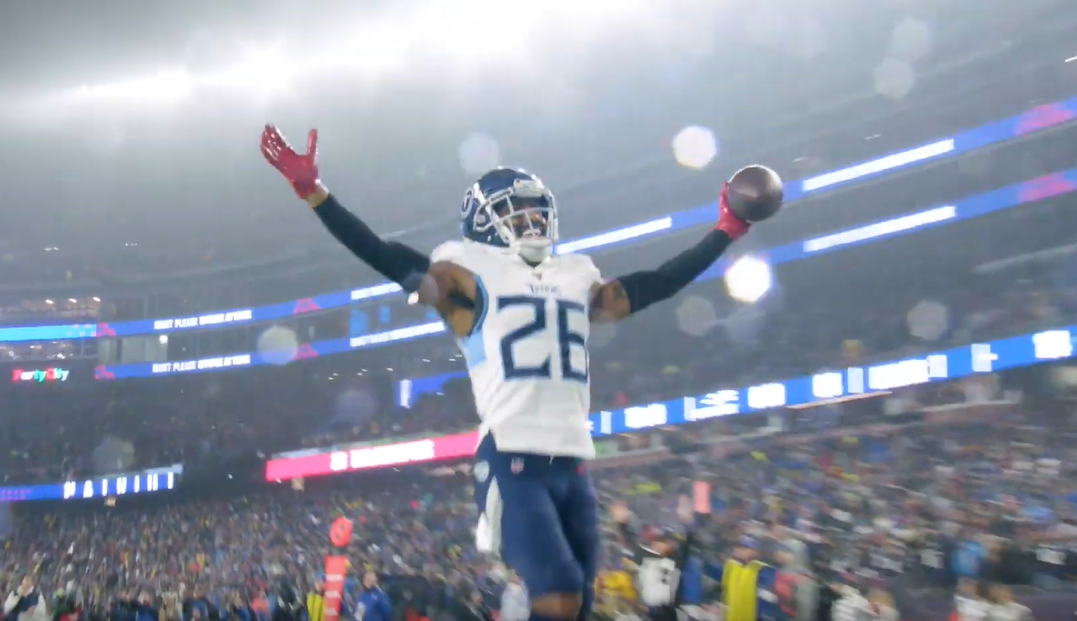
Ryan intercepting a pass thrown by former teammate Tom Brady, returning it for a touchdown in the AFC Wild Card Game against the Patriots

Ryan started in all 16 games for the first time in his career and finished the 2019 season with four interceptions while setting career-highs in combined tackles with 113 (73 solo), sacks with 4.5, pass deflections with 18, and forced fumbles with four. The Titans finished second in the AFC South with a 9–7 record and qualified for the playoffs as the #6-seed. During the Wild Card Round against his former team, the Patriots, Ryan had six combined tackles (three solo) and a pass deflection, and in the final seconds of the game with the Titans leading 14–13, and New England on their own one-yard line, he intercepted a deflected pass from former teammate Tom Brady (which turned out to be Brady's final pass as a Patriot as he did not return to the Patriots the following season) and returned it for a nine-yard touchdown. The score secured a 20–13 upset in Foxborough, allowing the Titans to play in the Divisional Round of the playoffs for the second time in three years. In the Divisional Round against the Ravens, Ryan recorded a team-high 13 combined tackles (nine solo) and a pass deflection during the 28–12 road victory. During the AFC Championship Game against the Chiefs, he had six solo tackles in the 35–24 road loss.

On May 5, 2020, Ryan announced that he would not return to the Titans. Ryan was ranked 60th by his fellow players on the NFL Top 100 Players of 2020.

=== New York Giants ===
==== 2020 season ====
On September 5, 2020, Ryan signed a one-year, $7.5 million contract with the Giants. This was the first season he chose to switch positions from cornerback to safety.

Ryan made his Giants debut in the season-opening 26–16 loss to the Steelers on Monday Night Football and finished with four combined tackles (two solo). In the next game against the Chicago Bears, Ryan recorded seven combined tackles (six solo) and a forced fumble during the 17–13 road victory. The following week against the 49ers, Ryan had seven combined tackles (four solo) and two pass deflections in the 36–9 loss.

During a Week 4 17–9 road loss to the Rams, Ryan recorded four solo tackles and a pass deflection. In the next game against the Cowboys, he had a team-high nine combined tackles (six solo) during the 37–34 loss, one of which was on quarterback Dak Prescott that caused Prescott's right ankle to compound fracture and dislocate. The following week against the Washington Football Team, Ryan recorded eight solo tackles, an interception, and sacked Kyle Allen once in the narrow 20–19 victory.

During Week 7 against the Eagles on Thursday Night Football, Ryan had five combined tackles (three solo) and a pass deflection in the narrow 22–21 road loss. Two weeks later against the Washington Football Team, a day after his wife suffered an ectopic pregnancy, Ryan recorded six combined tackles (five solo), two pass deflections, a forced fumble, and his first interception of the season off of Alex Smith with less than two minutes in the fourth quarter to secure a 23–20 road victory.

During a narrow Week 11 19–17 road victory over the Bengals, Ryan recorded six combined tackles (two solo), a pass deflection, a forced fumble, and a fumble recovery. Two weeks later against the Cardinals, he had five combined tackles (one solo) and a pass deflection in the 26–7 loss. In the next game against the Browns on Sunday Night Football, Ryan tied his season-high of nine combined tackles (seven solo) during the 20–6 loss.

On December 25, 2020, Ryan signed a three-year, $31 million contract extension with $20 million guaranteed. Two days later against the Ravens, he had eight combined tackles (seven solo) and a fumble recovery in the 27–13 road loss.

Ryan finished the 2020 season with 94 combined tackles (68 solo), an interception, nine pass deflections, three forced fumbles, and two fumble recoveries in 16 games and 15 starts.

==== 2021 season ====
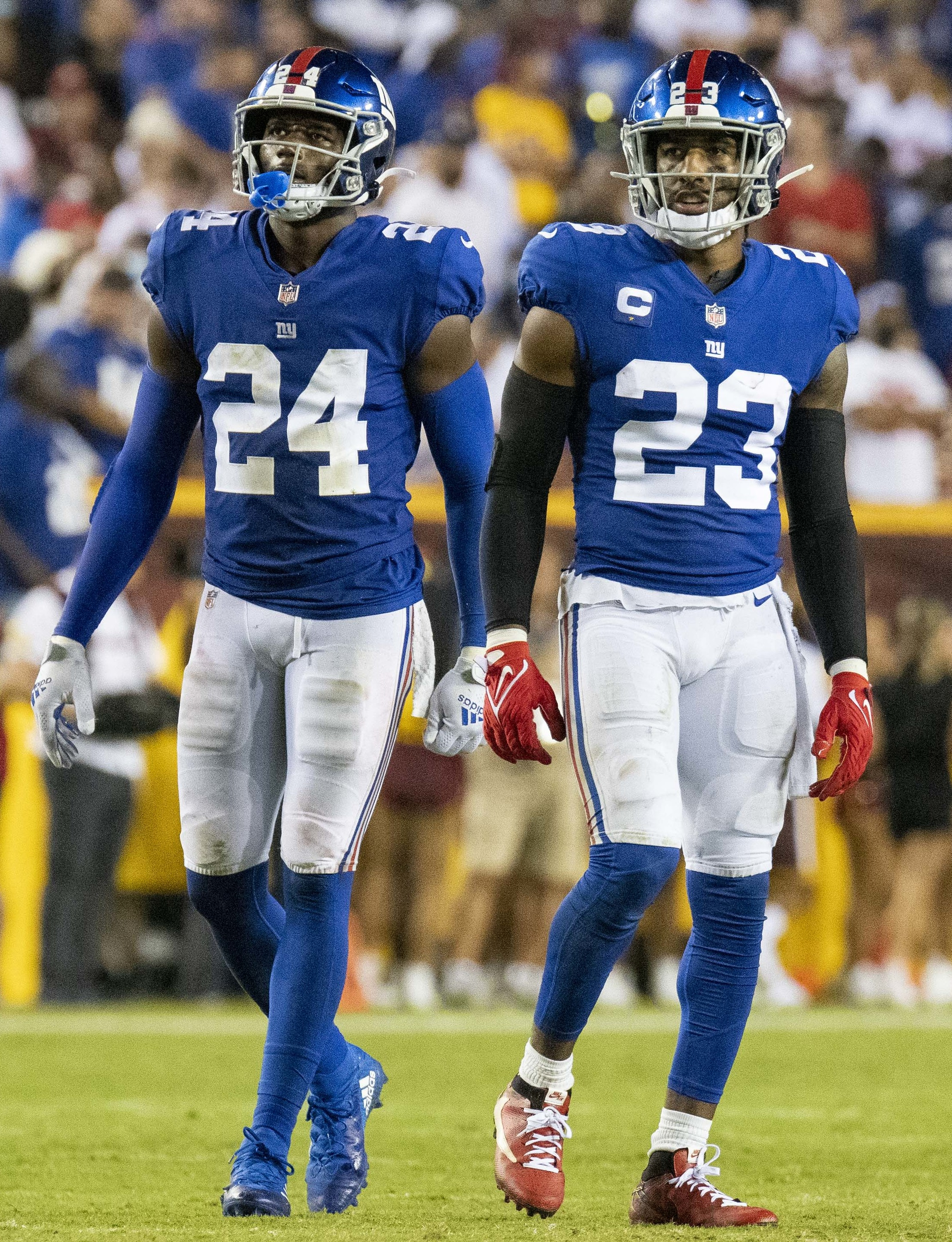
Ryan (right) in 2021

During the season-opener against the Broncos, Ryan had a team-high 10 combined tackles (eight solo), a forced fumble, and a fumble recovery in the 27–13 loss. Two weeks later against the Falcons, he recorded nine combined tackles (three solo) and a pass deflection in the 17–14 loss. In the next game against the Saints, Ryan had a team-high nine combined tackles (four solo) and a pass deflection during the 27–21 overtime road victory.

During a Week 5 44–20 road loss to the Cowboys, Ryan recorded a team-high eight combined tackles (six solo). In the next game against the Rams, he had seven combined tackles (five solo) and a pass deflection during the 38–11 loss. The following week against the Panthers, Ryan recorded four combined tackles (three solo) and two pass deflections in the 25–3 victory.

During Week 8 against the Chiefs on Monday Night Football, Ryan had nine combined tackles (seven solo) and a forced fumble in the 20–17 road loss. Following a Week 9 bye, the Giants returned home to face the Raiders. He finished the 23–16 victory with a team-high nine combined tackles (six tackles). On November 20, 2021, Ryan was placed on the reserve/COVID-19 list. He was activated 10 days later.

During a Week 15 21–6 loss to the Cowboys, Ryan tied his season-high of 10 combined tackles (eight solo). In the next game against the Eagles, Ryan recorded six combined tackles (five solo) and two pass deflections during the 34–10 road loss. The following week against the Bears, he had five combined tackles (three solo) and a pass deflection in the 29–3 road loss. During the regular-season finale against the Washington Football Team, Ryan recorded seven combined tackles (five solo) and his only sack of the season on Taylor Heinicke in the 22–7 loss.

Ryan finished the 2021 season with a career-high 117 combined tackles (77 solo), eight pass deflections, two forced fumbles, and a sack in 16 games and starts.

Ryan was released by the Giants on March 17, 2022.

=== Tampa Bay Buccaneers ===
On March 18, 2022, Ryan signed a one-year deal with the Buccaneers. The move reunited him with former Patriots teammate Tom Brady. Ryan was released during final roster cuts on August 30, but was re-signed the next day after Ryan Jensen was placed on injured reserve.

Ryan made his Buccaneers debut in the season-opener against the Cowboys on Sunday Night Football and finished the 19–3 road victory with five combined tackles (three solo). In the next game against the Saints, Ryan recorded three combined tackles (one solo), a forced fumble, and a pass deflection during the 20–10 road victory. The following week against the Green Bay Packers, he had a fumble recovery, a pass deflection, and an interception in the narrow 14–12 loss.

During a Week 4 41–31 loss to the Chiefs on Sunday Night Football, Ryan had a solo tackle before leaving in the first quarter with a foot injury. He was placed on injured reserve on October 18, and was activated on December 5.

Ryan returned from injury in time for the Week 13 matchup against the Saints on Monday Night Football. He finished the narrow 17–16 comeback victory with five combined tackles (three solo). In the next game against the 49ers, Ryan recorded a season-high and team-leading nine combined tackles (eight solo) during the 35–7 road loss. The following week against the Bengals, he had five combined tackles (two solo) and a pass deflection in the 34–23 loss.

Ryan finished the 2022 season with 37 combined tackles (24 solo), three pass deflections, an interception, and a forced fumble in nine games and six starts. The Buccaneers finished atop the NFC South with an 8–9 record and qualified for the playoffs. During the Wild Card Round against the Cowboys, Ryan recorded two solo tackles in the 31–14 loss.

=== San Francisco 49ers ===
On December 6, 2023, Ryan signed with the San Francisco 49ers after starting safety Talanoa Hufanga suffered a season-ending torn ACL.

Ryan made his 49ers debut in Week 14 against the Seahawks, but recorded no statistics in the 28–16 victory. During the regular season finale against the Rams, Ryan had a season-high seven combined tackles (five solo) in the narrow 21–20 loss.

Ryan finished the 2023 season with 13 combined tackles (nine solo) in five games and two starts. The 49ers finished atop the NFC West with a 12–5 record and qualified for the playoffs as the #1-seed. In the Divisional Round against the Packers, Ryan had three combined tackles (two solo) during the 24–21 victory. During the NFC Championship Game against the Lions, he recorded two combined tackles (one solo) in the 34–31 comeback victory as the 49ers advanced to Super Bowl LVIII. In the Super Bowl against the Chiefs, Ryan had seven combined tackles (three solo) and a forced fumble during the 25–22 overtime loss.

=== Retirement ===
On April 9, 2024, in a video posted on social media, Ryan announced his retirement from the NFL.

== NFL career statistics ==
Legend
	Won the Super Bowl
	Led the league
**Bold**	Career high

=== Regular season ===
Year	Team	Games		Tackles				Interceptions						Fumbles	
Year	Team	GP	GS	Cmb	Solo	Ast	Sck	PD	Int	Yds	Avg	Lng	TD	FF	FR
2013	NE	**16**	7	35	29	6	1.5	10	**5**	**82**	16.4	**79T**	**1**	1	0
2014	NE	**16**	6	42	29	13	0.0	6	2	0	0.0	0	0	2	0
2015	NE	**16**	14	74	58	16	0.0	14	4	39	9.8	25	0	0	0
2016	NE	**16**	13	92	74	19	1.0	11	2	46	**23.0**	46	0	1	0
2017	TEN	15	15	62	50	12	0.0	11	0	0	0.0	0	0	1	0
2018	TEN	14	14	76	54	22	4.0	8	0	0	0.0	0	0	0	0
2019	TEN	**16**	**16**	113	73	**40**	**4.5**	**18**	4	16	4.0	16	0	**4**	0
2020	NYG	**16**	15	94	68	26	1.0	9	1	15	15.0	15	0	3	**2**
2021	NYG	15	15	**117**	**77**	**40**	1.0	8	0	0	0.0	0	0	2	1
2022	TB	9	6	37	24	13	0.0	3	0	0	0.0	0	0	1	1
2023	SF	5	2	13	9	4	0.0	0	0	0	0.0	0	0	0	0
Career		154	123	755	545	210	13.0	98	18	198	10.9	79T	1	15	4

=== Postseason ===
Year	Team	Games		Tackles				Interceptions						Fumbles	
Year	Team	GP	GS	Cmb	Solo	Ast	Sck	PD	Int	Yds	Avg	Lng	TD	FF	FR
2013	NE	2	0	12	9	3	0.0	0	0	0	0.0	0	0	0	0
2014	NE	**3**	0	4	4	0	0.0	1	0	0	0.0	0	0	**1**	0
2015	NE	2	2	14	13	1	0.0	1	0	0	0.0	0	0	0	0
2016	NE	**3**	**3**	22	16	6	**1.0**	**4**	**1**	**23**	**23.0**	**23**	0	0	0
2017	TEN	2	2	15	13	2	0.0	0	0	0	0.0	0	0	0	0
2019	TEN	**3**	**3**	**25**	**18**	**7**	0.0	2	**1**	9	9.0	9T	**1**	0	0
2022	TB	1	0	2	2	0	0.0	0	0	0	0.0	0	0	0	0
2023	SF	**3**	1	12	6	6	0.0	0	0	0	0.0	0	0	**1**	0
Career		19	11	106	81	25	1.0	8	2	32	16.0	23	1	2	0

== Personal life ==
Ryan and his wife, Ashley, have two kids, Avery and Otto, and are the founders of The Ryan Animal Rescue Foundation (RARF.org). RARF works with animal welfare organizations to promote adoption and provide grants and educational opportunities. Every month on the 26th—the day corresponding to his jersey number—Ryan posts a photo on social media with a dog that is in need of adoption along with the hashtag #ryansmonthlyrescue. His older brother, Jordan, attended Drexel University and is now an engineer.

Ryan's wife needed emergency surgery during November 2020, due to trouble with her pregnancy.
