= Hobb Lake =

Body of water in New Jersey

- Bates Sawmill Pond
- Location within New Jersey Location within the United States
- Location: Winslow Township, New Jersey, U.S.
- Coordinates: 39°42′26″N 74°52′09″W
- Type: Reservoir
- Surface elevation: 95 ft (29 m)

Hobb Lake (also called Bates Sawmill Pond) is a major reservoir located in Winslow Township, New Jersey, United States. It was once open for public swimming and was called "The Lake of the Four Fountains". It is formed by the Pump Branch, a tributary of Albertson Brook.

== Recreation ==
Fishing is a popular activity at Hobb Lake. Great Times Day Camp, situated on Hobb Lake, is one of Southern New Jersey's popular summer camps. Camp Haluwasa, an older and still popular Christian children's camp and retreat, is located directly adjacent with its own 60 acres of lake waters, fed by Hobb Lake.
