= Tansboro, New Jersey =

Populated place in Camden County, New Jersey, US

- Unincorporated community
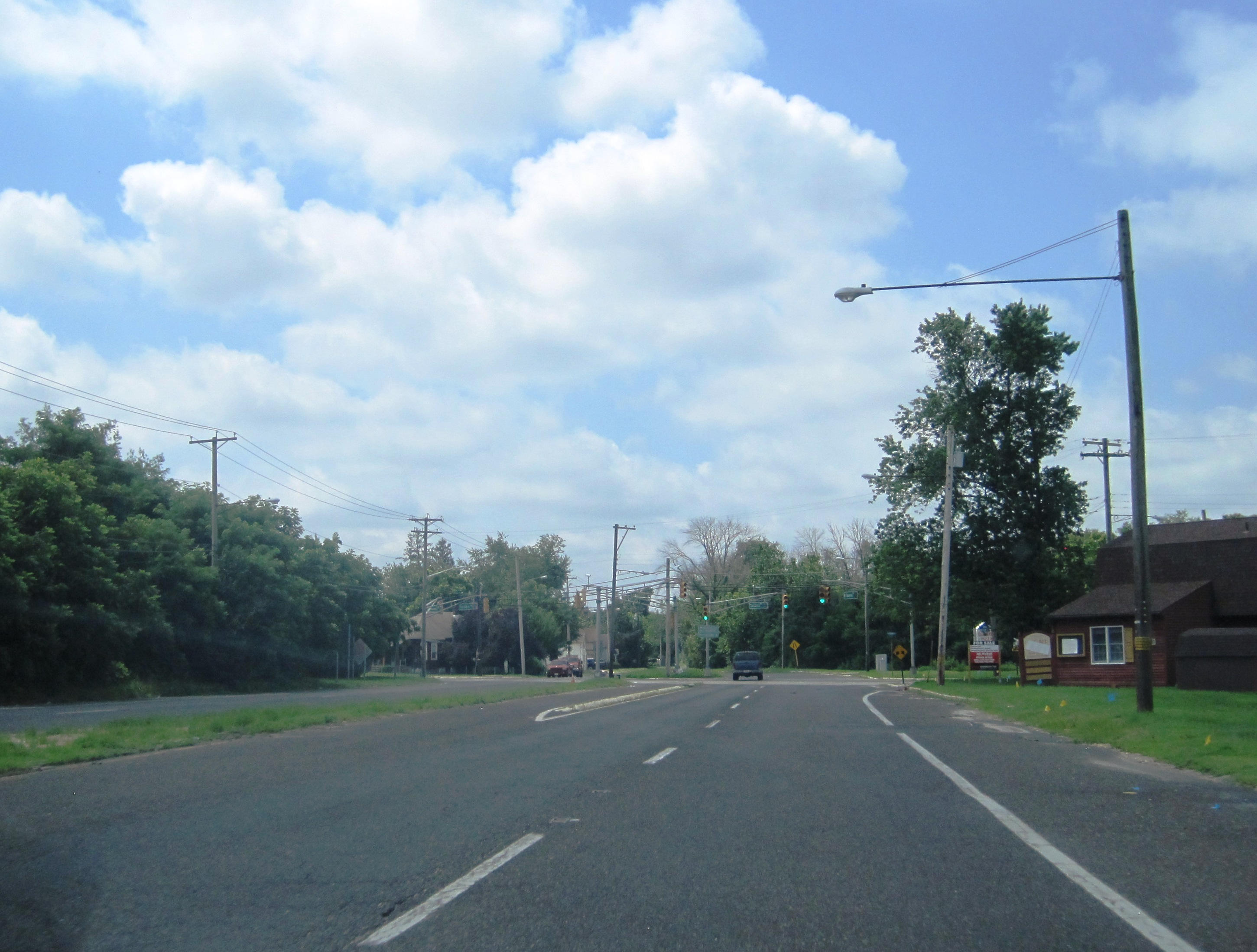
- Taunton Road southbound approaching Tansboro Road

- Location in Camden County (Inset: Camden County in New Jersey) Tansboro (New Jersey) Tansboro (the United States)
- Coordinates: 39°46′08″N 74°55′11″W
- Country: United States
- State: New Jersey
- County: Camden
- Township: Winslow
- Elevation: 160 ft (50 m)
- Time zone: UTC−05:00 (Eastern (EST))
  - Summer (DST): UTC−04:00 (EDT)
- GNIS feature ID: 881086

Tansboro is an unincorporated community located within Winslow Township in Camden County, in the U.S. state of New Jersey.

Edgewood Regional High School was a high school located in Tansboro. It opened in 1958 and was renamed Winslow Township High School in 2001. Some major roads in and around Tansboro include County Route 561, Route 73, and U.S. Route 30.
