= Winslow Township High School =

High school in Camden County, New Jersey, US

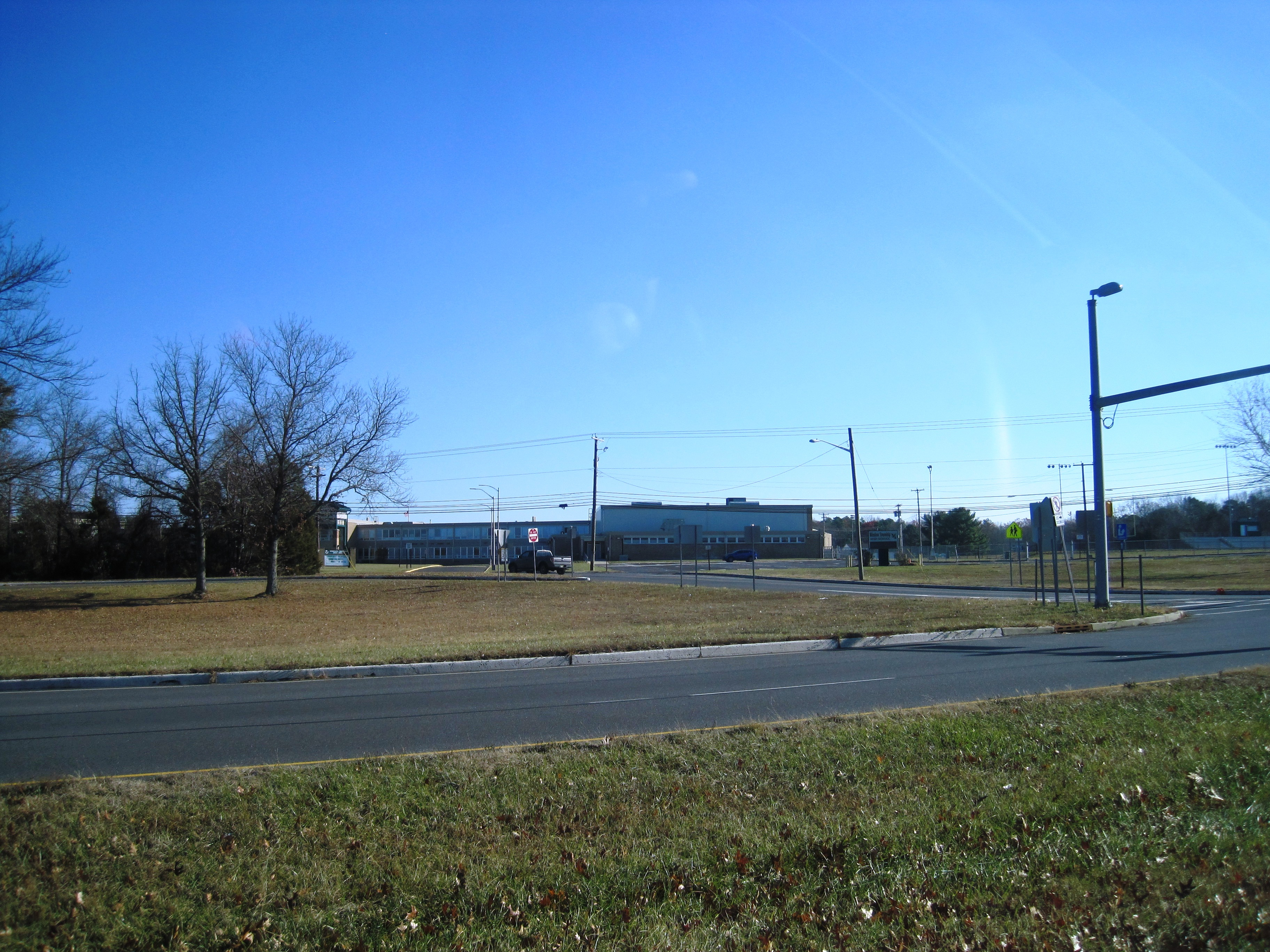
- Front of school seen from Route 73

Location
- 10 Coopers Folly Road; Atco in Winslow Township, Camden County, New Jersey 08004; United States; 39.7458°N 74.9076°W

Information
- Type: Public high school
- Established: 2000
- School district: Winslow Township School District
- NCES School ID: 341806000437
- Principal: Sybil Girard
- Faculty: 111.5 FTEs
- Grades: 9-12
- Enrollment: 1,299 (as of 2024–25)
- Student to teacher ratio: 11.7:1
- Colors: Forest Green; White
- Athletics conference: Olympic Conference (general); West Jersey Football League (football)
- Team name: Eagles
- Website: highschool.winslow-schools.com

Winslow Township High School (WTHS) is a four-year comprehensive public high school in the Atco section of Winslow Township, in Camden County, in the U.S. state of New Jersey, that serves students in ninth through twelfth grades as the lone secondary school of the Winslow Township School District. Until 2000, the facility that is now Winslow Township High School was part of the Lower Camden County Regional School District and was known as Edgewood Regional High School, which was the sister school of Overbook Regional Senior High School in Pine Hill (now known as Overbrook High School).

Students from Chesilhurst, a non-operating district, attend the district's schools as part of a sending/receiving relationship with the Chesilhurst Borough School District.

As of the 2024–25 school year, the school had an enrollment of 1,299 students and 111.5 classroom teachers (on an FTE basis), for a student–teacher ratio of 11.7:1. There were 781 students (60.1% of enrollment) eligible for free lunch and 8 (0.6% of students) eligible for reduced-cost lunch.

== Awards, recognition and rankings ==
The school was the 271st-ranked public high school in New Jersey out of 339 schools statewide in New Jersey Monthly magazine's September 2014 cover story on the state's "Top Public High Schools", using a new ranking methodology. The school had been ranked 299th in the state of 328 schools in 2012, after being ranked 309th in 2010 out of 322 schools listed. The magazine ranked the school 274th in 2008 out of 316 schools. The school was ranked 297th in the magazine's September 2006 issue, which surveyed 316 schools across the state. In 2014-15 the boys' basketball team won the group OV state championship.

== Extracurricular activities ==
=== Television production ===
Winslow Township High School Television Production, also known as "Studio 106," has won three National Student Television Awards (Student Emmy Awards) for both Writing and Technical Achievement from the Mid-Atlantic Chapter of the National Academy of Television Arts and Sciences. It has taken home top honors from the New Jersey State Teen Arts Competition (Film and Television Awards). Studio 106 produces a daily live morning show called "Bird's Eye View", which is a broadcast via closed-circuit television to the students and staff of Winslow Township High School.

=== Drama club and stage crew ===
- Each year Winslow's Drama Club and Stage Crew present at least two major productions, a comedy or drama in the fall and a musical in the spring. The ticket sales and fund raisers benefit the Theatre Guild Senior Scholarship Program. Previous performances include: Ah, Wilderness! (2001), South Pacific (2002), The Crucible (2002), The Music Man (2003), Don't Drink the Water (2003), Footloose (2004), It's a Wonderful Life (2004), How to Succeed in Business Without Really Trying (2005), Our Miss Brooks (2005), The Sound of Music (2006), Miracle on 34th Street (2006), Little Shop of Horrors (2007), A Christmas Carol (2007), Guys and Dolls (2008), Arsenic and Old Lace (2008), Grease (2009)", A Christmas Story (2009), The Fiddler on the Roof" (2010) and Disney's Beauty and the Beast (2011)
- The WTHS Drama Club and Stage Crew have been recognized for outstanding achievement in theatre by the distinguished Paper Mill Playhouse Rising Star Awards.
- The WTHS Drama Club and Stage Crew has taken home top honors multiple years from the New Jersey State Teen Arts Competition.

=== Sports ===
The Winslow Township High School Eagles participate in the Olympic Conference, which is comprised of public and private high schools located in Burlington and Camden counties, and operates under the supervision of the New Jersey State Interscholastic Athletic Association. With 953 students in grades 10–12, the school was classified by the NJSIAA for the 2019–20 school year as Group 3 for most athletic competition purposes, which included schools with an enrollment of 761 to 1,058 students in that grade range. The football team competes in the Independence Division of the 94-team West Jersey Football League superconference and was classified by the NJSIAA as Group IV South for football for 2024–2026, which included schools with 890 to 1,298 students.

Winslow Township High School hosted games as part of the 2004 Lamar Hunt U.S. Open Cup soccer tournament.

In spring 2006, Winslow Township created an ice hockey club team for students of Winslow Township High School, playing competitive hockey in the South Jersey league out of the Flyers Skatezone in Voorhees, New Jersey. In fall 2006 and early 2007, Winslow Ice Hockey competed in the Independent High School league out of the Vineland Ice Arena in Vineland, New Jersey.

The boys indoor / winter track team won the Group IV state championship in 2003 and won in Group III in 2004. The girls team won the Group IV indoor track title in 2003 and in Group III in 2006, 2012-2015 and 2018–2020; the program's 10 group titles is tied for the most of any school in the state.

The boys track team won the indoor relay championship in Group IV in 2003, and won the Group III title in 2004 and 2008. The girls team won the Group III title in 2011, 2013 (as co-champion), 2015 and 2018–2020; The girls program's five state titles are tied for seventh-most in the state

The girls team won the NJSIAA spring track Group IV state championship in 2004 and won the Group III title in 2013, 2014 and 2016–2019. The program's eight state titles are tied for fourth in the state.

The high school marching band won the 2017 Group 2A Tournament of Bands Atlantic Coast Championship and the 2021 Group 1A Tournament of Bands Atlantic Coast Championship with a score of 95.25, a school record. Both, the 2017 and 2021 seasons were undefeated by Winslow.

== Army JROTC ==
The Winslow Township High School is host to a branch of U.S. Army JROTC. The Battalion, named Soaring Eagle, is well known in the community and even conducts annual food drives. It is currently an Honor Unit. The school's program currently does not have an army instructor, so for the time being, the program has ceased.

== Shooting plot ==
Winslow Township High School gained national attention in 2006 because of a shooting plot which was to take place during a lunch period. Two females, sophomores at the high school, had heard rumors of a plot in close relation to the 2003 movie 'Elephant' and alerted school officials who in turn notified the Winslow Township Police Department. The students involved were arrested before the plot could be carried out. The only subject to be sentenced at this point has received four years probation and must undergo counseling and psychological evaluations

== Administration ==
The school's principal is Sybil Girard. Her core administration team includes three assistant principals and the athletic director.

== Notable alumni ==
- Bill Belton (born 1992, class of 2011), Offensive Coordinator for Winslow Township High School, running back who played with the Penn State Nittany Lions
- Jordan Burroughs (born 1988), Olympic gold medalist in wrestling
- Ka'Lial Glaud (born 1990, class of 2009), linebacker who has played in the NFL for the Tampa Bay Buccaneers and Dallas Cowboys
- Shonn Greene (born 1985), running back for the Tennessee Titans after a record setting career at the University of Iowa
- Brandon Jones (born 1989), football cornerback
- Tziarra King (born 1998), professional soccer player who plays as a forward for National Women's Soccer League (NWSL) club Utah Royals FC
- Jeromy Miles (born 1987), safety for the Cincinnati Bengals
- Dennis Mitchell (born 1966), Olympic gold medalist in the 4 x 100 meters relay race at the 1992 Summer Olympics
- James Rolfe (born 1980, class of 1999), filmmaker, better known as The Angry Video Game Nerd
- Julian Talley (born 1989), wide receiver for the Baltimore Brigade of the Arena Football League (AFL)

== Notable faculty ==
- Christian Hackenberg (born 1995), former American football quarterback
