= Andrew K. Hay =

American politician

Member of the U.S. House of Representatives from New Jersey's 1st district
- In office March 4, 1849 – March 3, 1851
- Preceded by: James G. Hampton
- Succeeded by: Nathan T. Stratton

Personal details
- Born: Andrew Kessler Hay; January 19, 1809 Lowell, Massachusetts
- Died: February 7, 1881 (aged 72) Winslow Township, New Jersey
- Resting place: Colestown Cemetery
- Party: Republican (from 1872); Whig (until 1856)
- Profession: Politician

Andrew Kessler Hay (January 19, 1809 – February 7, 1881) was an American Whig and Republican politician who represented New Jersey's 1st congressional district in the United States House of Representatives from 1849 to 1851.

== Biography ==
Hay was born near Lowell, Massachusetts, on January 19, 1809. He completed preparatory studies and was employed in the manufacture of window glass.

=== Early career ===
In 1829, he moved to Waterford Works, New Jersey, in Winslow Township, and engaged in the manufacture of glass with his father-in-law, John Hammond Coffin, in Winslow and Hammonton. In 1836, he was leased his glassworks in conjunction with Coffin's natural son Bodine; Hay became the sole owner in 1851.

=== Congress ===
Hay was elected as a Whig to the Thirty-first Congress, serving in office from March 4, 1849, to March 3, 1851.

=== Later career ===
After leaving Congress, he resumed his business interests. He was a presidential elector on the Republican ticket in the 1872 United States presidential election. One of its incorporators in 1852 and a director since 1870, he replaced Robert Frazer as president of the Camden and Atlantic Railroad in October 1873; in 1875, William Massey was made acting president due to Hay's severe ill health and in March 1876, Hay stepped down for the same reason, being succeeded by John Lucas. He remained in his directing position until his death.

=== Death and burial ===
Hay died in Winslow Township on February 7, 1881, and was interred in Colestown Cemetery in what is now Cherry Hill Township, New Jersey.

=== Family ===
He had three daughters and a son, William C. Hay. His nephew, John B. Hay, became head of Hay & Company.

== See also ==
- New Jersey in the 19th century
- Politics of New Jersey

== Sources ==
U.S. House of Representatives
Preceded by James G. Hampton	Member of the U.S. House of Representatives from New Jersey's 1st congressional district March 4, 1849–March 3, 1851	Succeeded by Nathan T. Stratton
