= Julian Talley =

American football player (born 1989)

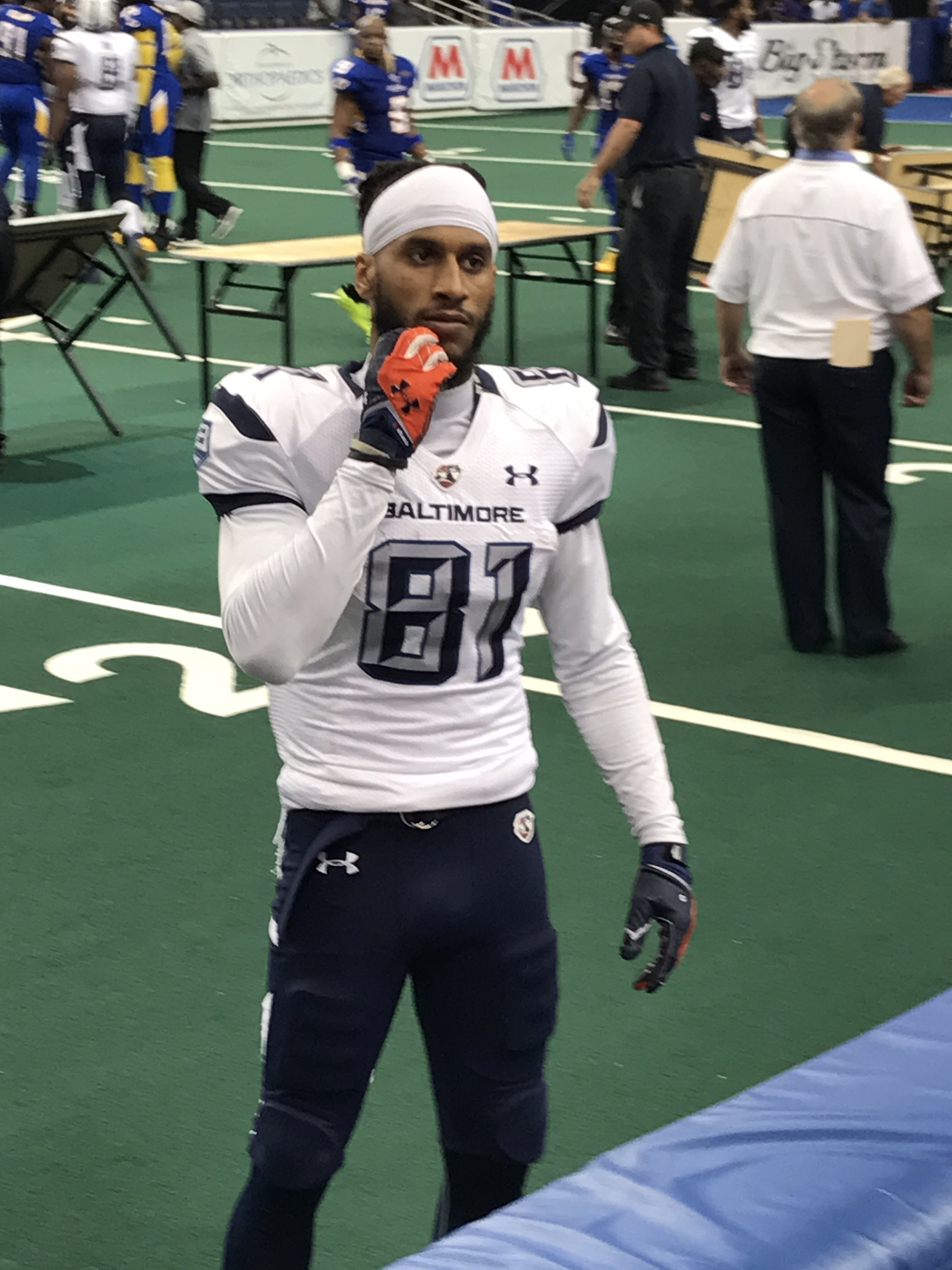
- Talley with the Baltimore Brigade in 2017

No. 19, 89, 81
- Position: Wide receiver

Personal information
- Born: June 9, 1989 (age 37); Stratford, New Jersey, U.S.
- Listed height: 6 ft 1 in (1.85 m)
- Listed weight: 192 lb (87 kg)

Career information
- High school: Winslow Township (Atco, New Jersey)
- College: Massachusetts
- NFL draft: 2012: undrafted

Career history
- New York Giants (2012)*; Pittsburgh Power (2013); New York Giants (2013–2015); Winnipeg Blue Bombers (2016)*; Baltimore Brigade (2017); Albany Empire (2018)
- * Offseason or practice squad member only

Career NFL statistics
- Games played: 4
- Stats at Pro Football Reference

Career AFL statistics
- Receptions: 117
- Receiving yards: 1,533
- Receiving touchdowns: 31
- Stats at ArenaFan.com

Julian Talley (born June 9, 1989) is an American former professional football player who was a wide receiver in the National Football League (NFL). He played college football for the UMass Minutemen.

== Early life ==
A native of Stratford, New Jersey, Talley attended high school at Winslow Township High School, graduating in 2007. He was named a First-team All-State Group 3. His career totals at Winslow included 98 catches for 2,416 yards and 23 touchdowns including setting a school record in his senior year with 946 yards receiving. Talley signed a national letter of intent with the University of Massachusetts.

== College career ==
After redshirting for the 2007 season, Talley played in all 12 games as a freshman and totaled 18 catches for 234 yards. Talley followed up his freshman campaign with a 28 catch, 350-yard season in 2009 which included scoring his first collegiate touchdown. As a junior Talley was named Second-team All-CAA after catching 56 passes for 747 yards and 6 touchdowns. He was second on the team in receiving yards to teammate and future NFL star Victor Cruz. In his senior season Talley grabbed 60 passes for 759 yards and 4 touchdowns. Talley was a college teammate of NFL players Jeromy Miles and Victor Cruz.

== Professional career ==
=== New York Giants ===
Talley spent the 2012 in the Giants preseason camp before being cut.

=== Pittsburgh Power ===
He signed on with the Pittsburgh Power of the Arena Football League early in 2013. Talley finished the season with the Power catching 74 passes for 821 yards and 17 touchdowns.

=== Return to New York Giants ===
Again he was invited to Giants camp in 2013 and following camp he was signed to the practice squad. Julian made his first professional appearance on December 22, 2013, after an injury to his former college teammate Victor Cruz opened up a spot on the 53 man roster.

On October 6, 2014, Talley along with cornerback Chandler Fenner were cut in order to sign cornerback Jayron Hosley (after completion of a drug suspension) and running back Michael Cox (from the practice squad) to the 53-man roster. On October 8, 2014, Talley was re-signed to the practice squad.

On September 5, 2015, Talley was waived by the Giants. On September 6, 2015, he was signed to the Giants' practice squad. On September 30, 2015, he was released by the Giants. On October 7, 2015, Talley was re-signed to the practice squad. On November 17, 2015, he was released from the practice squad. On December 24, 2015, Talley was re-signed to the practice squad.

=== Winnipeg Blue Bombers ===
Talley signed with the Winnipeg Blue Bombers on April 20, 2016. He was released by the team on June 19, 2016.

=== Baltimore Brigade ===
On January 26, 2017, Talley was assigned to the Baltimore Brigade. On July 7, 2017, Talley was placed on injured reserve.

=== Albany Empire ===
On April 2, 2018, Talley was assigned to the Albany Empire.
