= Waterford Works, New Jersey =

Populated place in Camden County, New Jersey, US

- Unincorporated community
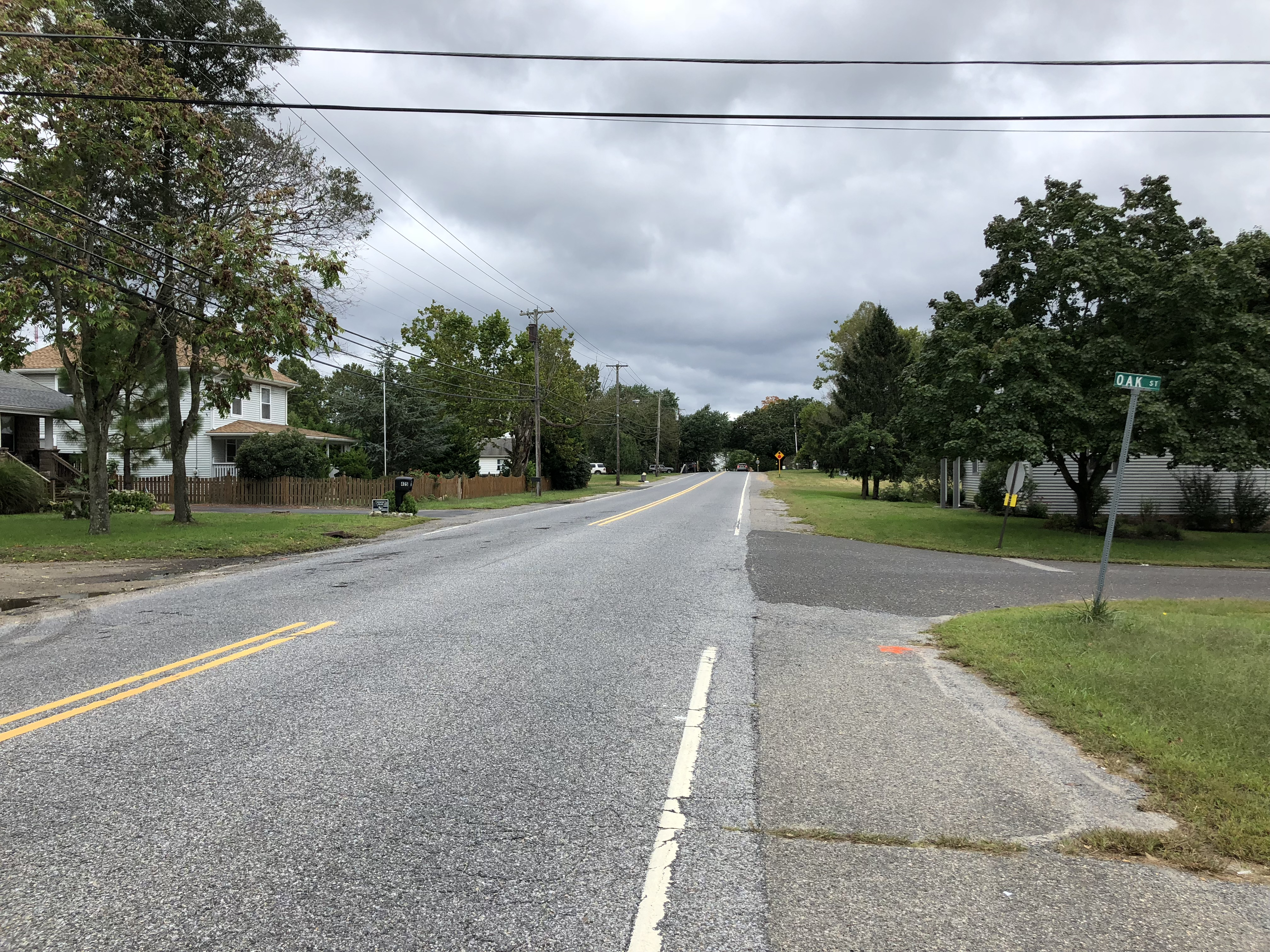
- CR 536 eastbound in Waterford Works

- Location in Camden County (Inset: Camden County in New Jersey) Waterford Works (New Jersey) Waterford Works (the United States)
- Coordinates: 39°43′23″N 74°50′57″W
- Country: United States
- State: New Jersey
- County: Camden
- Township: Winslow
- Elevation: 118 ft (36 m)
- Time zone: UTC−05:00 (Eastern (EST))
  - Summer (DST): UTC−04:00 (EDT)
- ZIP Code: 08089
- Area code: 856
- GNIS feature ID: 881615

Waterford Works is an unincorporated community located within Winslow Township in Camden County, in the U.S. state of New Jersey. Waterford Works is 1.8 miles (2.9 km) east-southeast of Chesilhurst. Waterford Works has a post office with ZIP Code 08089, which opened on February 13, 1838.
