= Winslow Township School District =

School district in Camden County, New Jersey, US

Address
- 30 Cooper Folly Road Atco, Camden County, New Jersey, 08004; United States
- Coordinates: 39.74938°N 74.905426°W

District information
- Grades: PreK to 12
- Superintendent: H. Major Poteat
- Business administrator: Tyra McCoy-Boyle
- Schools: 8

Students and staff
- Enrollment: 5,024 (as of 2023–24)
- Faculty: 441.0 FTEs
- Student–teacher ratio: 11.4:1

Other information
- District Factor Group: CD
- Website: www.winslow-schools.com
| Ind. | Per pupil | District spending | Rank (*) | K-12 average | %± vs. average |
|---|---|---|---|---|---|
| 1A | Total Spending | $20,292 | 75 | $18,891 | 7.4% |
| 1 | Budgetary Cost | 15,669 | 72 | 14,783 | 6.0% |
| 2 | Classroom Instruction | 9,554 | 82 | 8,763 | 9.0% |
| 6 | Support Services | 2,573 | 73 | 2,392 | 7.6% |
| 8 | Administrative Cost | 1,693 | 88 | 1,485 | 14.0% |
| 10 | Operations & Maintenance | 1,361 | 20 | 1,783 | −23.7% |
| 13 | Extracurricular Activities | 250 | 51 | 268 | −6.7% |
| 16 | Median Teacher Salary | 71,161 | 80 | 64,043 |
Data from NJDoE 2014 Taxpayers' Guide to Education Spending. *Of K-12 districts with more than 3,500 students. Lowest spending=1; Highest=103

The Winslow Township School District is a comprehensive community public school district that serves students in pre-kindergarten through twelfth grade from Winslow Township, in Camden County, in the U.S. state of New Jersey. The district operates four elementary schools (grades PreK–3), two upper elementary schools (grades 4–6), one middle school (grades 7–8) and one high school (grades 9–12). The district was established in 1998, after voters approved a split from the Lower Camden County Regional School District.

As of the 2023–24 school year, the district, comprised of eight schools, had an enrollment of 5,024 students and 441.0 classroom teachers (on an FTE basis), for a student–teacher ratio of 11.4:1.

The district is classified by the New Jersey Department of Education as being in District Factor Group "CD", the sixth-highest of eight groupings. District Factor Groups organize districts statewide to allow comparison by common socioeconomic characteristics of the local districts. From lowest socioeconomic status to highest, the categories are A, B, CD, DE, FG, GH, I and J.

Students from Chesilhurst attend the district's schools as part of a sending/receiving relationship with the Chesilhurst Borough School District. The Chesilhurst district had served public school students in kindergarten through sixth grade at Shirley B. Foster Elementary School until the completion of the 2008–09 school year, after which the district was no longer operating any schools and began sending all of its students to the Winslow Township district as part of an expansion of the pre-existing sending/receiving relationship that commenced in the 2009–10 school year.

== History ==
The district was formed in 1998, after voters approved a split from the Lower Camden County Regional School District, creating the Edgewood (later renamed Winslow) middle and high schools in 2001 to accompany the previously existing K-6 operation.

Winslow Township High School gained national attention in 2006 because of a shooting plot which was to take place during a lunch period. A student became aware of the plot and alerted school officials who in turn notified the Winslow Township Police Department. The students involved were arrested before the plot could be carried out. The only subject to be sentenced at this point has received four years probation and must undergo counseling and psychological evaluations.

== Schools ==
Schools in the district (with 2023–24 enrollment data from the National Center for Education Statistics) are:

Elementary schools

- Winslow Township Elementary School No. 1 with 374 students in grades PreK–3
  - Nathan W. Davis III, principal
- Winslow Township Elementary School No. 2 with 344 students in grades PreK–3
  - Christa McBride, principal
- Winslow Township Elementary School No. 3 with 454 students in grades PreK–3
  - Tamika Gilbert-Floyd, principal
- Winslow Township Elementary School No. 4 with 501 students in grades PreK–3
  - Lori Kelly, principal
- Winslow Township Elementary School No. 5 with 580 students in grades 4–6
  - Nython Carter, principal
- Winslow Township Elementary School No. 6 with 525 students in grades 4–6
  - Lynette Brown, principal

Middle school

- Winslow Township Middle School with 794 students in grades 7–8
  - William Shropshire, principal

High school

- Winslow Township High School with 1,296 students in grades 9–12
  - Kurtis Marella, principal

== Administration ==
Core members of the district's administration are:

- H. Major Poteat, superintendent
- Tyra McCoy-Boyle, board secretary / business administrator

== Board of education ==
The district's board of education, comprised of nine members, sets policy and oversees the fiscal and educational operation of the district through its administration. As a Type II school district, the board's trustees are elected directly by voters to serve three-year terms of office on a staggered basis, with three seats up for election each year held (since 2012) as part of the November general election. The board appoints a superintendent to oversee the district's day-to-day operations and a business administrator to supervise the business functions of the district.
