= Nescochague Creek =

River in New Jersey, United States

Coordinates: 39°40′16″N 74°42′09″W

Nescochague Creek (Lenni-Lenape: Edgeachick Branch, Pactockeach Branch) is a 6.4-mile-long (10.3 km) tributary of the Mullica River in southern New Jersey in the United States. The creek starts just northwest of Hammonton, arcs along the southern boundary of Wharton State Forest, and joins the Mullica River just above County Route 542.

The upper creek is named Albertson Brook, assuming the name Nescochague Creek after the confluence with Great Swamp Brook.

== Tributaries ==
- Great Swamp Brook

== See also ==
- List of rivers of New Jersey
