= Brandon Jones (cornerback) =

American football player (born 1989)

No. 36
- Position: Cornerback

Personal information
- Born: November 2, 1989 (age 37); Sicklerville, New Jersey, U.S.
- Listed height: 6 ft 0 in (1.83 m)
- Listed weight: 191 lb (87 kg)

Career information
- High school: Winslow Township (Atco, New Jersey)
- College: Rutgers
- NFL draft: 2013: undrafted

Career history
- New England Patriots (2013)*; New York Giants (2013)*; Pittsburgh Steelers (2013)*; San Diego Chargers (2013–2014)*; Kansas City Chiefs (2014)*
- * Offseason or practice squad member only
- Stats at Pro Football Reference

Brandon Jones (born November 2, 1989) is an American former professional football cornerback. He played college football for the Rutgers Scarlet Knights.

== Early life ==
Jones grew up in Winslow Township, New Jersey and attended Winslow Township High School where he earned all-state athletic honors.

== Professional career ==
Pre-draft measurables
Height	Weight	Arm length	Hand span	Wingspan	40-yard dash	10-yard split	20-yard split	20-yard shuttle	Three-cone drill	Vertical jump	Broad jump	Bench press
6 ft 0 1/4 in (1.84 m)	191 lb (87 kg)	30 7/8 in (0.78 m)	8 3/8 in (0.21 m)	6 ft 2 1/4 in (1.89 m)	4.56 s	1.59 s	2.65 s	4.08 s	6.76 s	36.5 in (0.93 m)	9 ft 10 in (3.00 m)	17 reps
All values from Pro Day

=== New England Patriots ===
On May 3, 2013, Jones signed with the New England Patriots as an undrafted free agent. On August 26, 2013, he was cut by the Patriots.

=== New York Giants ===
On November 4, 2013, Jones was signed to the New York Giants' He was released on November 26, 2013.

=== Pittsburgh Steelers ===
On December 3, 2013, the Pittsburgh Steelers signed Jones. He was released on December 13, 2013 to clear up roster space for Ross Ventrone.

=== San Diego Chargers ===
On December 18, 2013, the San Diego Chargers signed cornerback Brandon Jones He was waived on June 25, 2014 to make room for newly acquired cornerback Brandon Flowers.

=== Kansas City Chiefs ===
The Kansas City Chiefs claimed Jones off waivers on June 26, 2014. The Chiefs released Jones on August 25, 2014.

=== BC Lions ===
Jones was signed to the BC Lions' on September 30, 2014. He was released by the Lions on November 4, 2014. After that he then had workouts with the Detroit Lions and Atlanta Falcons in 2015.
