= Great Swamp Brook =

River in New Jersey, United States

Coordinates: 39°40′57″N 74°44′41″W

Great Swamp Brook (Great Swamp Branch on federal maps) is a 9.1-mile-long (14.6 km) tributary of Nescochague Creek in the southern New Jersey Pine Barrens in the United States.

== See also ==
- List of rivers of New Jersey
