= Chesilhurst, New Jersey =

Borough in Camden County, New Jersey, US

- Borough
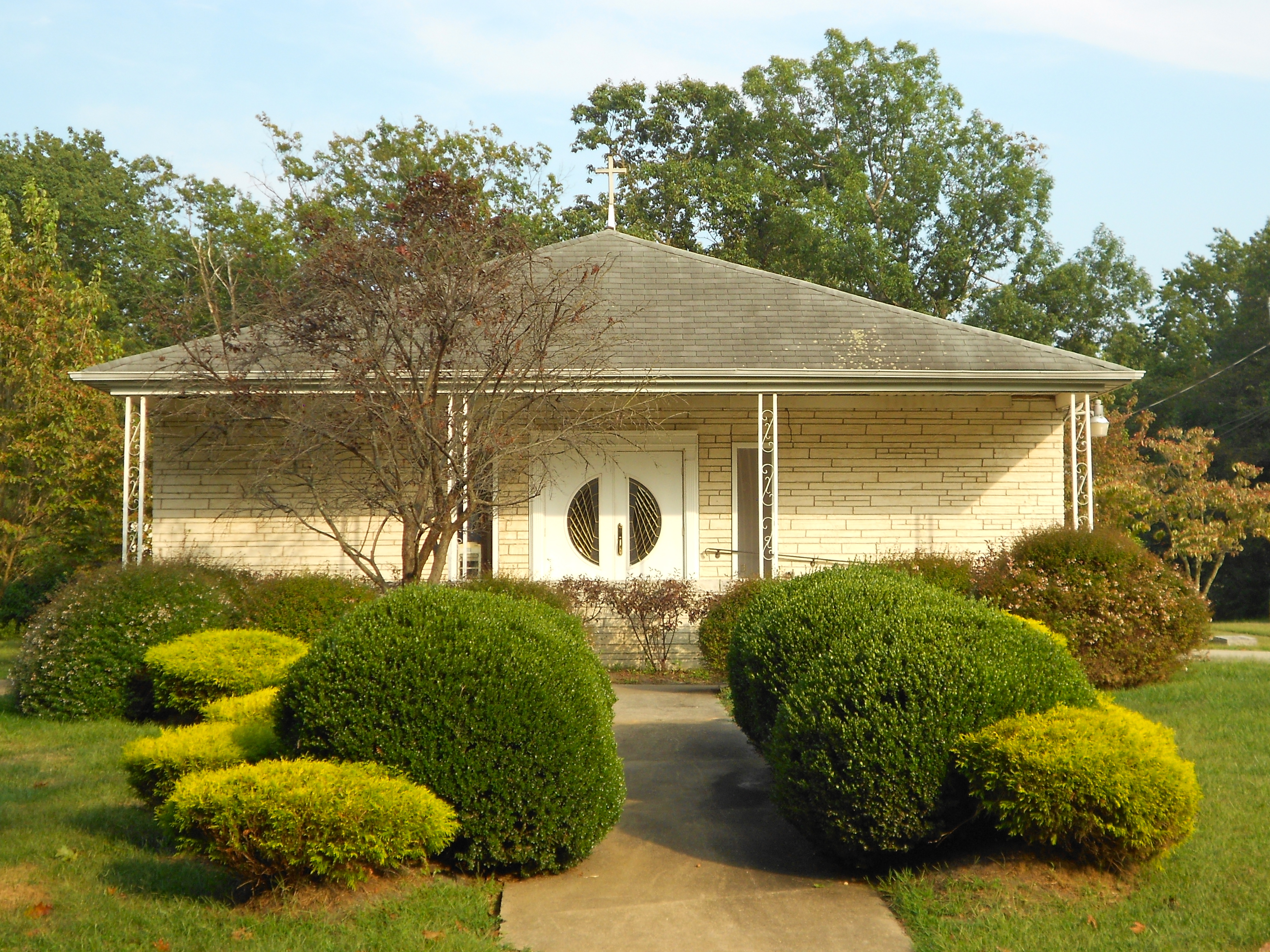
- Grant A.M.E. Church

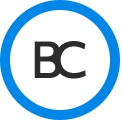
- Seal

- Location of Chesilhurst in Camden County highlighted in red (right). Inset map: Location of Camden County in New Jersey highlighted in orange (left).

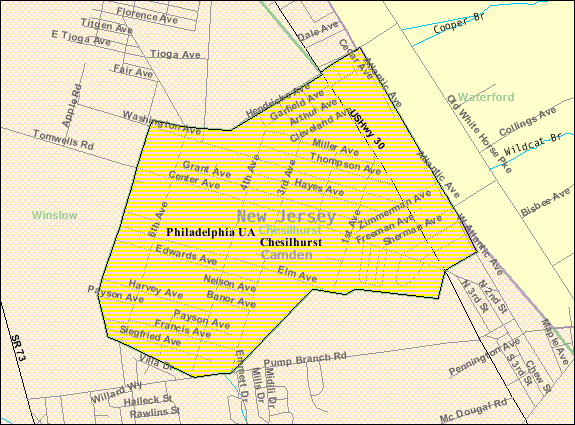
- Census Bureau map of Chesilhurst, New Jersey

- Location in Camden County Location in New Jersey Location in the United States
- Coordinates: 39.729795°N 74.880531°W
- Country: United States
- State: New Jersey
- County: Camden
- Incorporated: November 26, 1887

Government
  - Type: Borough
  - Body: Borough Council
  - Mayor: Jamila Odom Garnett (D, term ends December 31, 2026)
  - Municipal clerk: Gloria Rose

Area
  - Total: 1.72 sq mi (4.45 km^{2})
  - Land: 1.71 sq mi (4.44 km^{2})
  - Water: 0 sq mi (0.00 km^{2}) 0.12%
  - Rank: 430th of 565 in state 20th of 37 in county
- Elevation: 151 ft (46 m)

Population (2020)
  - Total: 1,536
  - Estimate (2023): 1,546
  - Rank: 510th of 565 in state 33rd of 37 in county
  - Density: 895.4/sq mi (345.7/km^{2})
  - Rank: 395th of 565 in state 33rd of 37 in county
- Time zone: UTC−05:00 (Eastern (EST))
  - Summer (DST): UTC−04:00 (Eastern (EDT))
- ZIP Code: 08089
- Area code: 856
- FIPS code: 3400712550
- GNIS feature ID: 0885183
- Website: chesilhurstboro.org

Chesilhurst is a borough in Camden County, in the U.S. state of New Jersey. As of the 2020 United States census, the borough's population was 1,536, a decrease of 98 (−6.0%) from the 2010 census count of 1,634, which in turn reflected an increase of 114 (+7.5%) from the 1,520 counted in the 2000 census.

Chesilhurst was incorporated as a borough by an act of the New Jersey Legislature on November 26, 1887, from portions of Waterford and Winslow townships, based on the results of a referendum held on October 18, 1887.

New Jersey Monthly magazine ranked Chesilhurst the worst town in the state in its 2008 rankings of "Best Places to Live" in New Jersey (placing at # 566 of 566).

== Geography ==
According to the U.S. Census Bureau, the borough had a total area of 1.72 square miles (4.45 km^{2}), including 1.72 square miles (4.44 km^{2}) of land and <0.01 square miles (<0.01 km^{2}) of water (0.12%).

The borough borders both Waterford Township and Winslow Township.

== Demographics ==
Historical population
Census	Pop.	Note	%±
1900	283		—
1910	246		−13.1%
1920	287		16.7%
1930	298		3.8%
1940	308		3.4%
1950	314		1.9%
1960	384		22.3%
1970	801		108.6%
1980	1,590		98.5%
1990	1,526		−4.0%
2000	1,520		−0.4%
2010	1,634		7.5%
2020	1,536		−6.0%
2023 (est.)	1,546	▲	0.7%
Population sources: 1900–2000 1900–1920; 1900–1910 1910–1930; 1940–2000 2000; 2010 2020

=== 2020 census ===
Chesilhurst borough, New Jersey – Racial and ethnic composition Note: the US Census treats Hispanic/Latino as an ethnic category. This table excludes Latinos from the racial categories and assigns them to a separate category. Hispanics/Latinos may be of any race.
Race / ethnicity (NH = Non-Hispanic)	Pop 2000	Pop 2010	Pop 2020	% 2000	% 2010	% 2020
White alone (NH)	560	643	636	36.84%	39.35%	41.41%
Black or African American alone (NH)	845	741	593	55.59%	45.35%	38.61%
Native American or Alaska Native alone (NH)	3	6	0	0.20%	0.37%	0.00%
Asian alone (NH)	5	14	10	0.33%	0.86%	0.65%
Pacific Islander alone (NH)	0	0	0	0.00%	0.00%	0.00%
Other race alone (NH)	5	5	7	0.33%	0.31%	0.46%
Mixed race or Multiracial (NH)	40	36	62	2.63%	2.20%	4.04%
Hispanic or Latino (any race)	62	189	228	4.08%	11.57%	14.84%
Total	1,520	1,634	1,536	100.00%	100.00%	100.00%

=== 2010 census ===
The 2010 United States census counted 1,634 people, 582 households, and 376 families in the borough. The population density was 951.2 per square mile (367.3/km^{2}). There were 621 housing units at an average density of 361.5 per square mile (139.6/km^{2}). The racial makeup was 42.35% (692) White, 46.39% (758) Black or African American, 0.43% (7) Native American, 0.86% (14) Asian, 0.00% (0) Pacific Islander, 6.98% (114) from other races, and 3.00% (49) from two or more races. Hispanic or Latino of any race were 11.57% (189) of the population.

Of the 582 households, 18.7% had children under the age of 18; 40.5% were married couples living together; 18.0% had a female householder with no husband present and 35.4% were non-families. Of all households, 29.2% were made up of individuals and 15.5% had someone living alone who was 65 years of age or older. The average household size was 2.62 and the average family size was 3.24.

17.8% of the population were under the age of 18, 7.7% from 18 to 24, 23.5% from 25 to 44, 31.3% from 45 to 64, and 19.7% who were 65 years of age or older. The median age was 45.7 years. For every 100 females, the population had 93.8 males. For every 100 females ages 18 and older there were 89.7 males.

The Census Bureau's 2006–2010 American Community Survey showed that (in 2010 inflation-adjusted dollars) median household income was $57,969 (with a margin of error of +/− $14,321) and the median family income was $76,406 (+/− $14,069). Males had a median income of $42,232 (+/− $4,747) versus $36,908 (+/− $6,544) for females. The per capita income for the borough was $24,646 (+/− $2,686). About 3.2% of families and 8.3% of the population were below the poverty line, including 6.8% of those under age 18 and 16.9% of those age 65 or over.

== Government ==
=== Local government ===
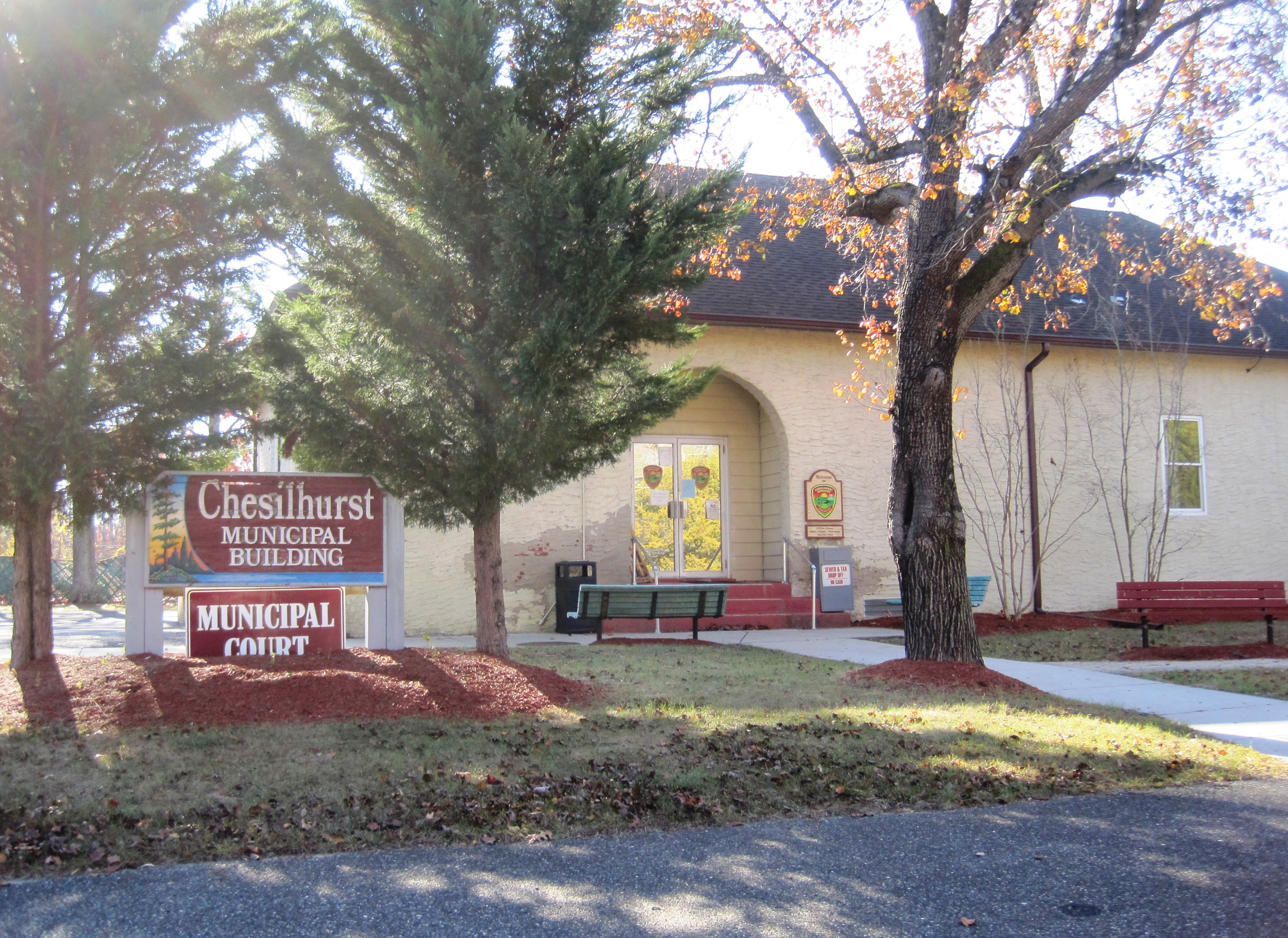
Chesilhurst Municipal Building

Chesilhurst is governed under the borough form of New Jersey municipal government, which is used in 218 municipalities (of the 564) statewide, making it the most common form of government in New Jersey. The governing body is comprised of a mayor and a borough council, with all positions elected at-large on a partisan basis as part of the November general election. A mayor is elected directly by the voters to a four-year term of office. The borough council includes six members elected to serve three-year terms on a staggered basis, with two seats coming up for election each year in a three-year cycle. The borough form of government used by Chesilhurst is a "weak mayor / strong council" government in which council members act as the legislative body with the mayor presiding at meetings and voting only in the event of a tie. The mayor can veto ordinances subject to an override by a two-thirds majority vote of the council. The mayor makes committee and liaison assignments for council members, and most appointments are made by the mayor with the advice and consent of the council.

As of 2026, the mayor of Chesilhurst is Democrat Jamila Odom Garnett, whose term of office ends December 31, 2026. Members of the Borough Council are Council President Russell S. Hirn Sr. (D, 2025), Monica Holmes (D, 2025), Cathleen Jordan (D, 2027), Pearlie C. Lee (D, 2027) and Antonia Plaza (D, 2026) and LaRhonda Pritchett (D, 2026).

In February 2023, the borough council appointed Antonia Plaza to fill the seat expiring in December 2023 that had been held by Maria C. Littles.

=== Federal, state, and county representation ===
Chesilhurst is located in the 1st Congressional District and is part of New Jersey's 4th state legislative district.

For the 119th United States Congress, New Jersey's 1st congressional district is represented by Donald Norcross (D, Camden). New Jersey is represented in the United States Senate by Democrats Cory Booker (Newark, term ends 2027) and Andy Kim (Moorestown, term ends 2031).

For the 2026–2027 session, the 4th legislative district of the New Jersey Legislature is represented in the State Senate by Paul D. Moriarty (D, Washington Township) and in the General Assembly by Dan Hutchison (D, Gloucester Township) and Cody Miller (D, Monroe Township).

Camden County is governed by a Board of County Commissioners composed of seven members chosen at-large in partisan elections for three-year terms on a staggered basis by the residents of the county, with either two or three seats up for election each year as part of the November general election. At a reorganization meeting held in January after each election, the newly constituted Board of Commissioners selects one member to serve as Director and another as Deputy Director, each serving a one-year term in that role. As of 2025, Camden County's Commissioners are: Commissioner Director Louis Cappelli Jr. (D, Collingswood, 2026), Commissioner Deputy Director Edward T. McDonnell (D, Pennsauken Township, 2025), Virginia Ruiz Betteridge (D, Runnemede, 2025), Almar Dyer (D, Pennsauken Township, 2027), Melinda Kane (D, Cherry Hill, 2027), Jeffrey L. Nash (D, Winslow Township, 2027), and Jonathan L. Young Sr. (D, Berlin Township, 2026).

Camden County's constitutional officers are: Clerk Pamela Rosen Lampitt (D, Cherry Hill, 2029) Sheriff Chuck Billingham (D, Gloucester City, 2027) and Surrogate Michelle Gentek-Mayer (D, Gloucester Township, 2025).

=== Politics ===
As of March 2011, there were a total of 1,156 registered voters in Chesilhurst, of which 673 (58.2%) were registered as Democrats, 79 (6.8%) were registered as Republicans and 404 (34.9%) were registered as Unaffiliated. There were no voters registered to other parties.

Gubernatorial election results for Chesilhurst
Year	Republican		Democratic		Third party(ies)	
Year	No.	%	No.	%	No.	%
2025	174	31.75%	369	67.34%	5	0.91%
2021	160	35.79%	284	63.53%	3	0.67%
2017	88	22.62%	296	76.09%	5	1.29%
2013	135	34.79%	249	64.18%	4	1.03%
2009	102	23.18%	314	71.36%	24	5.45%
2005	88	19.64%	332	74.11%	28	6.25%

In the 2012 presidential election, Democrat Barack Obama received 82.8% of the vote (629 cast), ahead of Republican Mitt Romney with 16.2% (123 votes), and other candidates with 1.1% (8 votes), among the 767 ballots cast by the borough's 1,250 registered voters (7 ballots were spoiled), for a turnout of 61.4%. In the 2008 presidential election, Democrat Barack Obama received 82.8% of the vote (657 cast), ahead of Republican John McCain, who received around 14.2% (113 votes), with 793 ballots cast among the borough's 1,241 registered voters, for a turnout of 63.9%. In the 2004 presidential election, Democrat John Kerry received 77.4% of the vote (518 ballots cast), outpolling Republican George W. Bush, who received around 19.4% (130 votes), with 669 ballots cast among the borough's 1,038 registered voters, for a turnout percentage of 64.5.

United States presidential election results for Chesilhurst
Year	Republican		Democratic		Third party(ies)	
Year	No.	%	No.	%	No.	%
2024	265	36.01%	459	62.36%	12	1.63%
2020	254	31.17%	552	67.73%	9	1.10%
2016	191	26.98%	505	71.33%	12	1.69%
2012	123	16.18%	629	82.76%	8	1.05%
2008	113	14.25%	657	82.85%	23	2.90%
2004	130	19.43%	518	77.43%	21	3.14%

In the 2013 gubernatorial election, Democrat Barbara Buono received 64.2% of the vote (249 cast), ahead of Republican Chris Christie with 34.8% (135 votes), and other candidates with 1.0% (4 votes), among the 400 ballots cast by the borough's 1,240 registered voters (12 ballots were spoiled), for a turnout of 32.3%. In the 2009 gubernatorial election, Democrat Jon Corzine received 71.4% of the vote (314 ballots cast), ahead of both Republican Chris Christie with 23.2% (102 votes) and Independent Chris Daggett with 2.7% (12 votes), with 440 ballots cast among the borough's 1,161 registered voters, yielding a 37.9% turnout.

United States Senate election results for Chesilhurst1
Year	Republican		Democratic		Third party(ies)	
Year	No.	%	No.	%	No.	%
2024	239	33.71%	453	63.89%	17	2.40%
2018	136	23.49%	396	68.39%	47	8.12%
2012	106	14.87%	595	83.45%	12	1.68%
2006	72	18.18%	312	78.79%	12	3.03%

United States Senate election results for Chesilhurst2
Year	Republican		Democratic		Third party(ies)	
Year	No.	%	No.	%	No.	%
2020	236	29.21%	565	69.93%	7	0.87%
2014	59	15.05%	329	83.93%	4	1.02%
2013	35	12.41%	245	86.88%	2	0.71%
2008	106	15.36%	570	82.61%	14	2.03%

== Education ==
The Chesilhurst Borough School District had served public school students in kindergarten through sixth grade at Shirley B. Foster Elementary School. After the completion of the 2008–2009 school year, the district was no longer operating any schools and began sending all of its students to the Winslow Township School District as part of a sending/receiving relationship that commenced in the 2009–10 school year.

Despite the fact that the district does not operate any school facilities, the district's board of education, comprised of seven members, sets policy and oversees the operation of the sending relationship. As a Type II school district, the board's trustees are elected directly by voters to serve three-year terms of office on a staggered basis, with either one or two seats up for election each year held (since 2012) as part of the November general election.

== Transportation ==
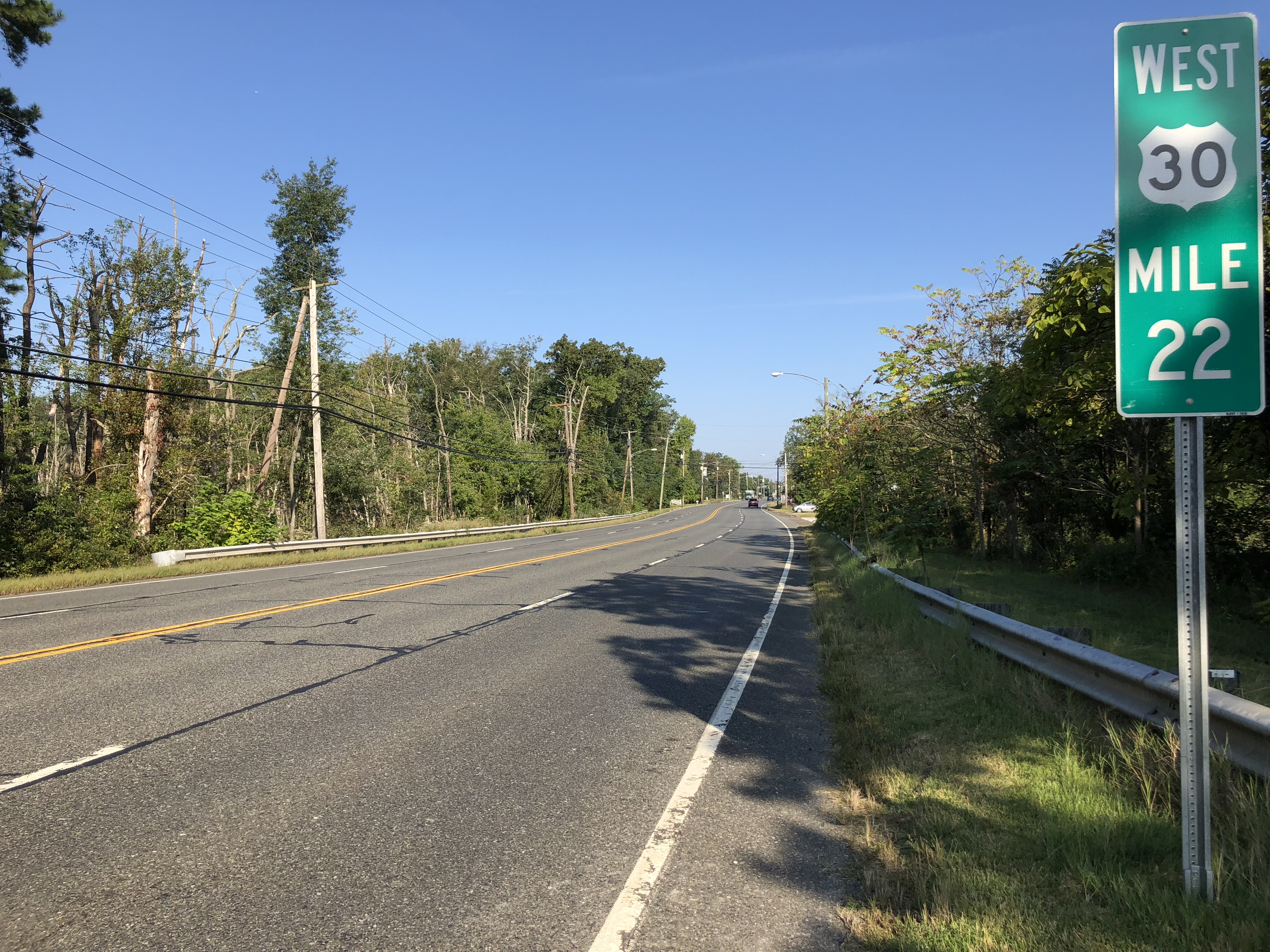
U.S. Route 30 westbound in Chesilhurst

=== Roads and highways ===
As of May 2010, the borough had a total of 19.89 miles (32.01 km) of roadways, of which 15.47 miles (24.90 km) were maintained by the municipality, 3.27 miles (5.26 km) by Camden County and 1.15 miles (1.85 km) by the New Jersey Department of Transportation.

U.S. Route 30 is the main road serving Chesilhurst. CR 536 runs along the southern border briefly. The Atlantic City Expressway is accessible in neighboring Winslow Township.

=== Public transportation ===
NJ Transit local bus service is provided on the 554 route between the Lindenwold station and Atlantic City.
