= Winslow Township, New Jersey =

Township in Camden County, New Jersey, US

- Township
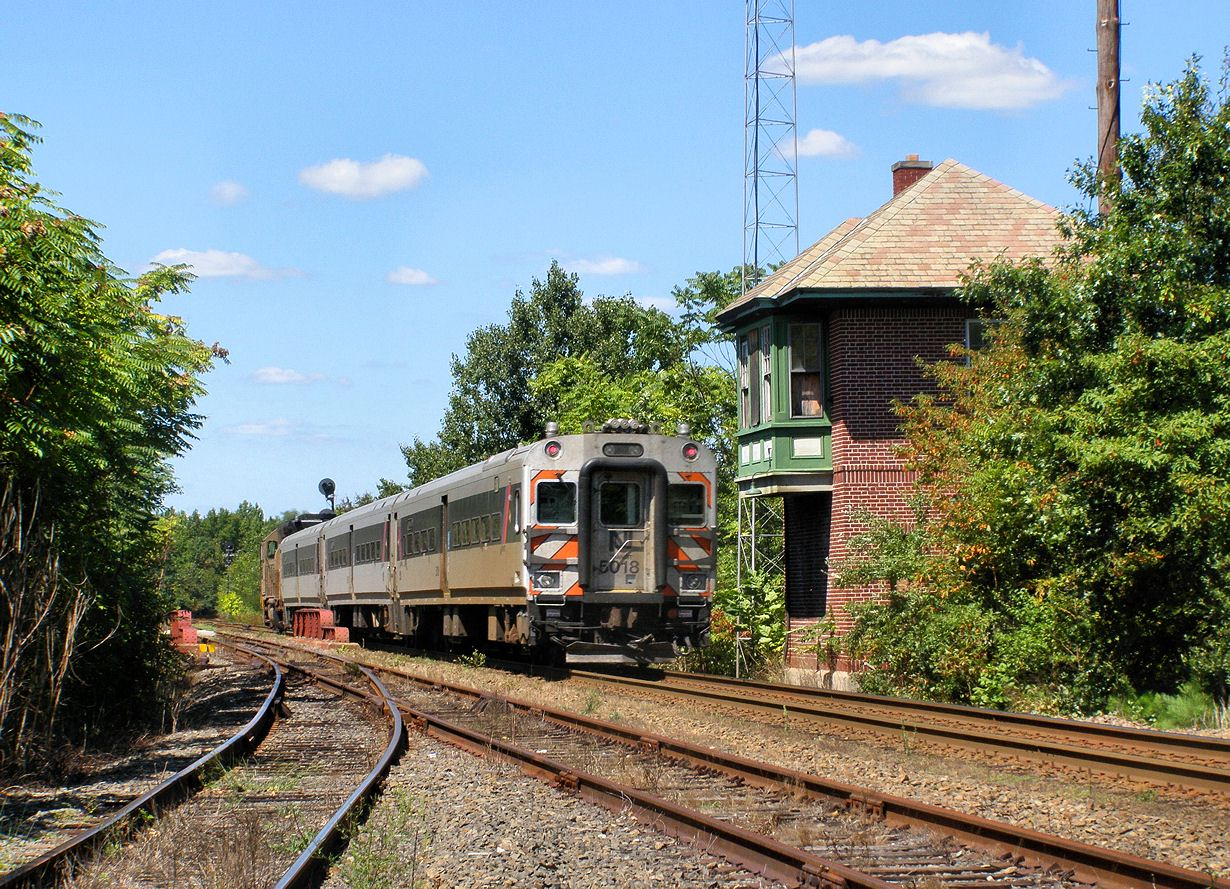
- Atlantic City Line commuter train at Winslow Junction

- Seal

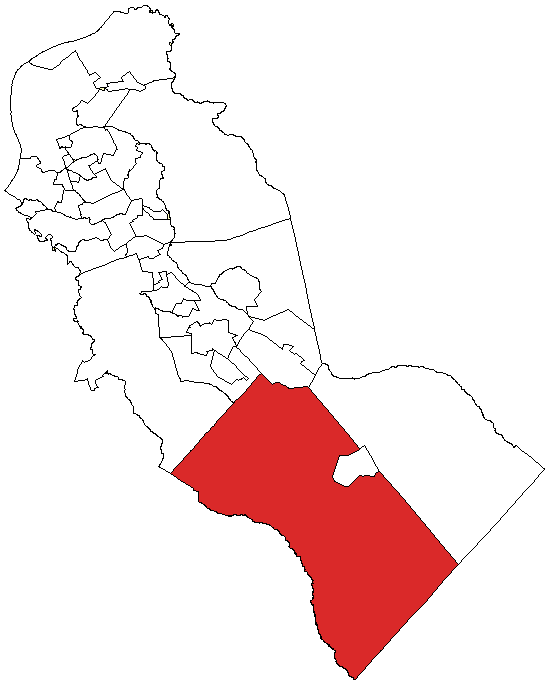
- Location of Winslow Township in Camden County highlighted in red.

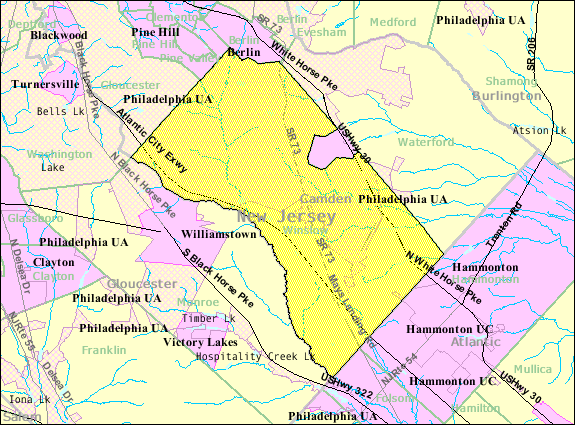
- Census Bureau map of Winslow Township, New Jersey

- Location in Camden County Location in New Jersey Location in the United States
- Coordinates: 39.701722°N 74.908351°W
- Country: United States
- State: New Jersey
- County: Camden
- Incorporated: November 26, 1867
- Named after: Edward Winslow Coffin

Government
  - Type: Township
  - Body: Township Committee
  - Mayor: Marie Lawrence (D, ending December 31, 2027)
  - Administrator: Joseph Gallagher
  - Municipal clerk: Lisa Dority

Area
  - Total: 58.25 sq mi (150.87 km^{2})
  - Land: 57.42 sq mi (148.71 km^{2})
  - Water: 0.83 sq mi (2.16 km^{2}) 1.43%
  - Rank: 24th of 565 in state 1st of 37 in county
- Elevation: 135 ft (41 m)

Population (2020)
  - Total: 39,907
  - Estimate (2023): 40,047
  - Rank: 60th of 565 in state 4th of 37 in county
  - Density: 695/sq mi (268/km^{2})
  - Rank: 421st of 565 in state 34th of 37 in county
- Time zone: UTC−05:00 (Eastern (EST))
  - Summer (DST): UTC−04:00 (Eastern (EDT))
- ZIP Code: 08095
- Area codes: 609, 856
- FIPS code: 3400781740
- GNIS feature ID: 0882150
- Website: www.winslowtownship.com

Winslow Township is a township in Camden County, in the U.S. state of New Jersey. As of the 2020 United States census, the township's population was 39,907, an increase of 408 (+1.0%) from the 2010 census count of 39,499, which in turn reflected an increase of 4,888 (+14.1%) from the 34,611 counted in the 2000 census.

Winslow Township was incorporated as a township by an act of the New Jersey Legislature on March 8, 1845, from portions of Gloucester Township. Portions of the township were taken on November 26, 1867, to create Chesilhurst. In 1950, the township annexed a portion of Monroe Township in Gloucester County. The township, and all of Camden County, is part of South Jersey and the Philadelphia metropolitan area.

== History ==
Winslow Township is Camden County's largest municipality at 58 square miles (150 km^{2}). The township got its name from the son of a 19th-century glass factory owner, William Coffin Sr., who bought large tracts of timber in Camden County about six miles west of Hammonton and with his son-in-law in 1929. Thomas Jefferson Perce and William Coffin Jr., built the Winslow Glass Works (his second one in 12 years) in the midst of a thick pine forest. The community was named for Senior Coffin's youngest son, Edward Winslow Coffin.

Winslow Township was incorporated in 1845 from the Township of Gloucester. The township's very first meeting was held at Josiah Albertson's Blue Anchor Inn which was located on what is now Route 73 in the vicinity of St Lucy's Church. During its early years Winslow was known for its thriving glass business which developed as a result of the township's abundant resources of timber, clay, and sand, though by the start of the 20th century the glass industry died throughout Winslow. During the early 20th century, Winslow's population continued to grow until it peaked at a small 11,000 residents by the 1970s. During this time period the majority of Winslow residents were farmers. In 1965, Winslow township started to see an increase in population as the Atlantic City Expressway was completed with an interchange in Winslow at Williamstown Road. The proximity of the interchange drew developers towards the Sicklerville section of the township, where Levitt & Sons would build thousands of homes throughout the 1970s. Between 1970 and 1980, Winslow's population nearly doubled to 20,000 residents.

As of 2006, 80% of the township currently sits in the Pinelands National Reserve, thus restricting future land development. Despite the restriction of development on the reserve, there are still agricultural areas in the township.

The township is also served by two area codes, 856 and 609. When area code 609 was split in 1999, the southern/eastern end in the township (primarily those with a Hammonton mailing address, Cedar Brook, and a small section of Sicklerville) were left in the 609 code, while the other sections closer to Berlin and Williamstown received 856 as their area code.

Landmarks

- St Lucy's Roman Catholic Church, Route 73. It became a parish in 1961. The Rev. Edward McDaid is pastor.
- Bates Mills Cemetery is a cemetery located on South Erhke Road in Blue Anchor, Today passersby can observe a number of very old grave stones with hardly visible faded initials engraved upon them. The stones seem to be made from iron ore.
- Pinelands National Reserve
- Levitt and Sons Incorporated built Winslow Crossing in the 1970s in Sicklerville. The complexes that were built at that time were Primrose Gate, Manor Hall, Victoria Manor, Eden Hollow, Lehigh Manor, Arbor Meadows and Ivy Meadows.
- In 1972, the Lutheran affiliated Winslow Community Church opens in the Cedar Brook Hunting and Fishing Club.

Historical timeline

- 1845: Winslow is incorporated from parts of Gloucester Township.
- 1920: Albion School is built.
- 1923: Sicklerville School is built.
- 1925: St. Lucys Roman Catholic Church begins in the Blue Anchor section of Winslow Township as a mission to Our Lady of Mount Carmel Church in Berlin, New Jersey.
- 1928: Blue Anchor and Tansboro Schools are built.
- 1940: Closed Dunbarton and North Tansboro Schools are sold.
- 1955: A hospital is established at Ancora.

== Geography ==
According to the United States Census Bureau, the township had a total area of 58.25 square miles (150.87 km^{2}), including 57.42 square miles (148.71 km^{2}) of land and 0.83 square miles (2.16 km^{2}) of water (1.43%).

Unincorporated communities, localities and place names located wholly or partially within the township include Albion, Ancora, Braddock, Blue Anchor, Cedar Brook, Dicktown, Elm, Florence, New Freedom, Pen Byrn, Sicklertown, Sicklerville, Spring Garden, Tansboro, Waterford, Waterford Works, West Atco, Williamstown, Winslow Junction and Winslow Village.

The Blue Hole is a body of water in the middle of woods that is clear blue and always cold, even in the summer, with a very steep shoreline and a maximum depth of approximately 70 feet (21 m), though Weird NJ describes the water as "bottomless" and claims that it is a haunt of the Jersey Devil.

The township borders Berlin Borough, Chesilhurst, Gloucester Township, Pine Hill, and Waterford Township in Camden County; Folsom and Hammonton in Atlantic County, and both Monroe Township and Washington Township in Gloucester County.

== Demographics ==
Historical population
| Census | Pop. | Note | %± |
|---|---|---|---|
| 1850 | 1,540 | | — |
| 1860 | 1,800 | | 16.9% |
| 1870 | 2,050 | * | 13.9% |
| 1880 | 2,158 | | 5.3% |
| 1890 | 2,408 | | 11.6% |
| 1900 | 2,392 | | −0.7% |
| 1910 | 2,919 | | 22.0% |
| 1920 | 3,379 | | 15.8% |
| 1930 | 4,744 | | 40.4% |
| 1940 | 4,866 | | 2.6% |
| 1950 | 5,102 | | 4.8% |
| 1960 | 9,142 | | 79.2% |
| 1970 | 11,202 | | 22.5% |
| 1980 | 20,034 | | 78.8% |
| 1990 | 30,087 | | 50.2% |
| 2000 | 34,611 | | 15.0% |
| 2010 | 39,599 | | 14.4% |
| 2020 | 39,907 | | 0.8% |
| 2023 (est.) | 40,047 | | 0.4% |
Population sources: 1850–2000; 1850–1920 1850–1870 1850; 1870 1880–1890; 1890–1910 1910–1930; 1940–2000 2000; 2010 2020 * = Lost territory in previous decade.

=== 2010 census ===
The 2010 United States census counted 39,499 people, 13,735 households, and 10,178 families in the township. The population density was 688.8 per square mile (265.9/km^{2}). There were 14,560 housing units at an average density of 253.9 per square mile (98.0/km^{2}). The racial makeup was 54.41% (21,491) White, 36.17% (14,287) Black or African American, 0.29% (113) Native American, 3.10% (1,224) Asian, 0.04% (14) Pacific Islander, 2.97% (1,172) from other races, and 3.03% (1,198) from two or more races. Hispanic or Latino of any race were 8.10% (3,200) of the population.

Of the 13,735 households, 35.0% had children under the age of 18; 52.7% were married couples living together; 16.1% had a female householder with no husband present and 25.9% were non-families. Of all households, 20.7% were made up of individuals and 7.3% had someone living alone who was 65 years of age or older. The average household size was 2.81 and the average family size was 3.25.

25.7% of the population were under the age of 18, 8.1% from 18 to 24, 28.1% from 25 to 44, 27.4% from 45 to 64, and 10.6% who were 65 years of age or older. The median age was 37.3 years. For every 100 females, the population had 92.6 males. For every 100 females ages 18 and older there were 89.6 males.

The Census Bureau's 2006–2010 American Community Survey showed that (in 2010 inflation-adjusted dollars) median household income was $68,169 (with a margin of error of +/– $2,425) and the median family income was $78,892 (+/– $4,026). Males had a median income of $53,815 (+/– $1,828) versus $44,860 (+/– $2,189) for females. The per capita income for the borough was $27,884 (+/– $974). About 4.1% of families and 6.1% of the population were below the poverty line, including 6.3% of those under age 18 and 7.3% of those age 65 or over.

=== 2000 census ===
As of the 2000 United States census there were 34,611 people, 11,661 households, and 9,002 families residing in the township. The population density was 599.9 inhabitants per square mile (231.6/km^{2}). There were 12,413 housing units at an average density of 215.1 per square mile (83.1/km^{2}). The racial makeup of the township was 69.34% White, 29.34% African American, 0.35% Native American, 1.30% Asian, 0.03% Pacific Islander, 1.58% from other races, and 1.96% from two or more races. Hispanic or Latino of any race were 4.31% of the population.

There were 11,661 households, out of which 41.7% had children under the age of 18 living with them, 59.2% were married couples living together, 13.5% had a female householder with no husband present, and 22.8% were non-families. 18.8% of all households were made up of individuals, and 6.9% had someone living alone who was 65 years of age or older. The average household size was 2.87 and the average family size was 3.28.

In the township, the population was spread out, with 28.8% under the age of 18, 7.0% from 18 to 24, 34.4% from 25 to 44, 21.3% from 45 to 64, and 8.5% who were 65 years of age or older. The median age was 34 years. For every 100 females, there were 97.0 males. For every 100 females age 18 and over, there were 93.5 males.

The median income for a household in the township was $55,990, and the median income for a family was $62,045. Males had a median income of $43,320 versus $31,657 for females. The per capita income for the township was $21,254. About 4.5% of families and 6.0% of the population were below the poverty line, including 7.1% of those under age 18 and 7.7% of those age 65 or over.

== Government ==
=== Local government ===
Winslow Township is governed under the Township form of New Jersey municipal government, one of 141 municipalities (of the 564) statewide that use this form, the second-most commonly used form of government in the state. The governing body is comprised of a mayor and an eight-member Township Committee. The mayor is elected at-large to a four-year term of office. Committee members are elected in partisan elections to three-year terms in office on a staggered basis in a three-year cycle, with one seat coming up for election from each of the four wards in two consecutive years as part of the November general election and no ward seats up for vote in the third year of the cycle.

As of 2023, the Mayor of Winslow Township is Democrat Marie D. Lawrence, who was elected to serve the term of office ending December 31, 2023, that had been held by Barry Wright. Members of the Winslow Township Committee are Deputy Mayor Charles Flamini (D, 2023; Ward 4), Brandon Glikas (R, 2024; Ward 1), Jacquelyn Lee (D, 2023; Ward 3 - elected to serve an unexpired term), Charles Leps (R, 2023; Ward 1), Evelyn M. Leverett (D, 2023; Ward 2), Carlos Vascos (D, 2024; Ward 2), Raymond Watkins Jr. (D, 2024; Ward 3) and John A. Wilson (D, 2024; Ward 4).

In March 2022, Marie Lawrence was selected from a list of three names submitted by the Democratic municipal committee to fill the seat expiring in December 2023 that had been held by Barry Wright until his death the previous month. Lawrence served on an interim basis until the November 2022 general election, when voters choose her to serve the balance of the term of office. In April 2022, Jacquelyn Lee was selected from the three candidates submitted by the Democratic committee to fill the seat expiring in December 2023 that had become vacant when Marie Lawrence took office as mayor. In the November 2022 general election, Lawrence and Lee were both elected to serve the remainders of their terms of office.

=== Federal, state and county representation ===
Winslow Township is located in the 1st Congressional District and is part of New Jersey's 4th state legislative district.

For the 119th United States Congress, New Jersey's 1st congressional district is represented by Donald Norcross (D, Camden). New Jersey is represented in the United States Senate by Democrats Cory Booker (Newark, term ends 2027) and Andy Kim (Moorestown, term ends 2031).

For the 2026–2027 session, the 4th legislative district of the New Jersey Legislature is represented in the State Senate by Paul D. Moriarty (D, Washington Township) and in the General Assembly by Dan Hutchison (D, Gloucester Township) and Cody Miller (D, Monroe Township).

Camden County is governed by a Board of County Commissioners composed of seven members chosen at-large in partisan elections for three-year terms on a staggered basis by the residents of the county, with either two or three seats up for election each year as part of the November general election. At a reorganization meeting held in January after each election, the newly constituted Board of Commissioners selects one member to serve as Director and another as Deputy Director, each serving a one-year term in that role. As of 2025, Camden County's Commissioners are: Commissioner Director Louis Cappelli Jr. (D, Collingswood, 2026), Commissioner Deputy Director Edward T. McDonnell (D, Pennsauken Township, 2025), Virginia Ruiz Betteridge (D, Runnemede, 2025), Almar Dyer (D, Pennsauken Township, 2027), Melinda Kane (D, Cherry Hill, 2027), Jeffrey L. Nash (D, Winslow Township, 2027), and Jonathan L. Young Sr. (D, Berlin Township, 2026).

Camden County's constitutional officers are: Clerk Pamela Rosen Lampitt (D, Cherry Hill, 2029) Sheriff Chuck Billingham (D, Gloucester City, 2027) and Surrogate Michelle Gentek-Mayer (D, Gloucester Township, 2025).

=== Politics ===
As of March 2011, there were a total of 24,975 registered voters in Winslow Township, of which 10,782 (43.2%) were registered as Democrats, 2,898 (11.6%) were registered as Republicans and 11,283 (45.2%) were registered as Unaffiliated. There were 12 voters registered as Libertarians or Greens.

Gubernatorial election results for Winslow Township
| Year | Republican | | Democratic | | Third party(ies) | |
| Year | No. | % | No. | % | No. | % |
|---|---|---|---|---|---|---|
| 2025 | 4,840 | 31.20% | 10,587 | 68.25% | 84 | 0.54% |
| 2021 | 4,692 | 38.58% | 7,399 | 60.84% | 70 | 0.58% |
| 2017 | 2,730 | 28.59% | 6,649 | 69.62% | 171 | 1.79% |
| 2013 | 4,502 | 51.78% | 4,091 | 47.05% | 102 | 1.17% |
| 2009 | 3,775 | 37.37% | 5,711 | 56.53% | 616 | 6.10% |
| 2005 | 3,182 | 35.71% | 5,334 | 59.87% | 394 | 4.42% |

In the 2012 presidential election, Democrat Barack Obama received 70.6% of the vote (12,183 cast), ahead of Republican Mitt Romney with 28.6% (4,937 votes), and other candidates with 0.8% (137 votes), among the 17,355 ballots cast by the township's 26,855 registered voters (98 ballots were spoiled), for a turnout of 64.6%. In the 2008 presidential election, Democrat Barack Obama received 68.5% of the vote (12,630 cast), ahead of Republican John McCain, who received around 29.0% (5,355 votes), with 18,445 ballots cast among the township's 24,426 registered voters, for a turnout of 75.5%. In the 2004 presidential election, Democrat John Kerry received 62.2% of the vote (9,305 ballots cast), outpolling Republican George W. Bush, who received around 36.6% (5,478 votes), with 14,963 ballots cast among the township's 21,944 registered voters, for a turnout percentage of 68.2%.

United States presidential election results for Winslow Township
| Year | Republican | | Democratic | | Third party(ies) | |
| Year | No. | % | No. | % | No. | % |
|---|---|---|---|---|---|---|
| 2024 | 7,114 | 34.82% | 13,092 | 64.08% | 226 | 1.11% |
| 2020 | 6,888 | 32.30% | 14,224 | 66.70% | 212 | 0.99% |
| 2016 | 5,649 | 32.14% | 11,462 | 65.22% | 464 | 2.64% |
| 2012 | 4,937 | 28.61% | 12,183 | 70.60% | 137 | 0.79% |
| 2008 | 5,355 | 29.03% | 12,630 | 68.47% | 460 | 2.49% |
| 2004 | 5,478 | 36.61% | 9,305 | 62.19% | 180 | 1.20% |

In the 2013 gubernatorial election, Republican Chris Christie received 51.8% of the vote (4,502 cast), ahead of Democrat Barbara Buono with 47.1% (4,091 votes), and other candidates with 1.2% (102 votes), among the 8,873 ballots cast by the township's 26,875 registered voters (178 ballots were spoiled), for a turnout of 33.0%. In the 2009 gubernatorial election, Democrat Jon Corzine received 56.5% of the vote (5,711 ballots cast), ahead of both Republican Chris Christie with 37.4% (3,775 votes) and Independent Chris Daggett with 3.7% (377 votes), with 10,102 ballots cast among the township's 24,894 registered voters, yielding a 40.6% turnout.

United States Senate election results for Winslow Township1
| Year | Republican | | Democratic | | Third party(ies) | |
| Year | No. | % | No. | % | No. | % |
|---|---|---|---|---|---|---|
| 2024 | 6,517 | 33.01% | 12,963 | 65.66% | 263 | 1.33% |
| 2018 | 4,551 | 31.75% | 9,073 | 63.29% | 711 | 4.96% |
| 2012 | 4,497 | 27.36% | 11,778 | 71.66% | 162 | 0.99% |
| 2006 | 3,138 | 35.24% | 5,553 | 62.37% | 213 | 2.39% |

United States Senate election results for Winslow Township2
| Year | Republican | | Democratic | | Third party(ies) | |
| Year | No. | % | No. | % | No. | % |
|---|---|---|---|---|---|---|
| 2020 | 6,700 | 31.67% | 14,296 | 67.58% | 158 | 0.75% |
| 2014 | 2,574 | 29.77% | 5,964 | 68.98% | 108 | 1.25% |
| 2013 | 1,732 | 30.25% | 3,963 | 69.21% | 31 | 0.54% |
| 2008 | 4,862 | 29.11% | 11,637 | 69.66% | 206 | 1.23% |

== Education ==
The Winslow Township School District is a public school district that serves students in pre-kindergarten through twelfth grades. The district operates four elementary schools (grades Pre-K–3), two upper elementary schools (grades 4–6), one middle school (grades 7–8) and one high school (grades 9–12). The district was formed in 1998, after voters approved a split from the Lower Camden County Regional School District, creating the Edgewood (later renamed Winslow) middle and high schools in 2001 to accompany the previously existing K–6 operation.

As of the 2023–24 school year, the district, comprised of eight schools, had an enrollment of 5,024 students and 441.0 classroom teachers (on an FTE basis), for a student–teacher ratio of 11.4:1. Schools in the district (with 2022–23 enrollment data from the National Center for Education Statistics) are Winslow Township Elementary School No. 1 with 374 students in grades PreK–3, Winslow Township Elementary School No. 2 with 344 students in grades PreK–3, Winslow Township Elementary School No. 3 with 454 students in grades PreK–3, Winslow Township Elementary School No. 4 with 501 students in grades PreK–3, Winslow Township Elementary School No. 5 with 580 students in grades 4–6, Winslow Township Elementary School No. 6 with 525 students in grades 4–6, Winslow Township Middle School with 794 students in grades 7–8 and Winslow Township High School with 1,296 students in grades 9–12.

Students from Chesilhurst attend the district's schools as part of a sending/receiving relationship with the Chesilhurst Borough School District. The Chesilhurst district had served public school students in kindergarten through sixth grade at Shirley B. Foster Elementary School until the completion of the 2008–2009 school year, after which the district was no longer operating any schools and began sending all of its students to the Winslow Township schools as part of an expansion of the pre-existing sending/receiving relationship that commenced in the 2009–10 school year.

== Transportation ==
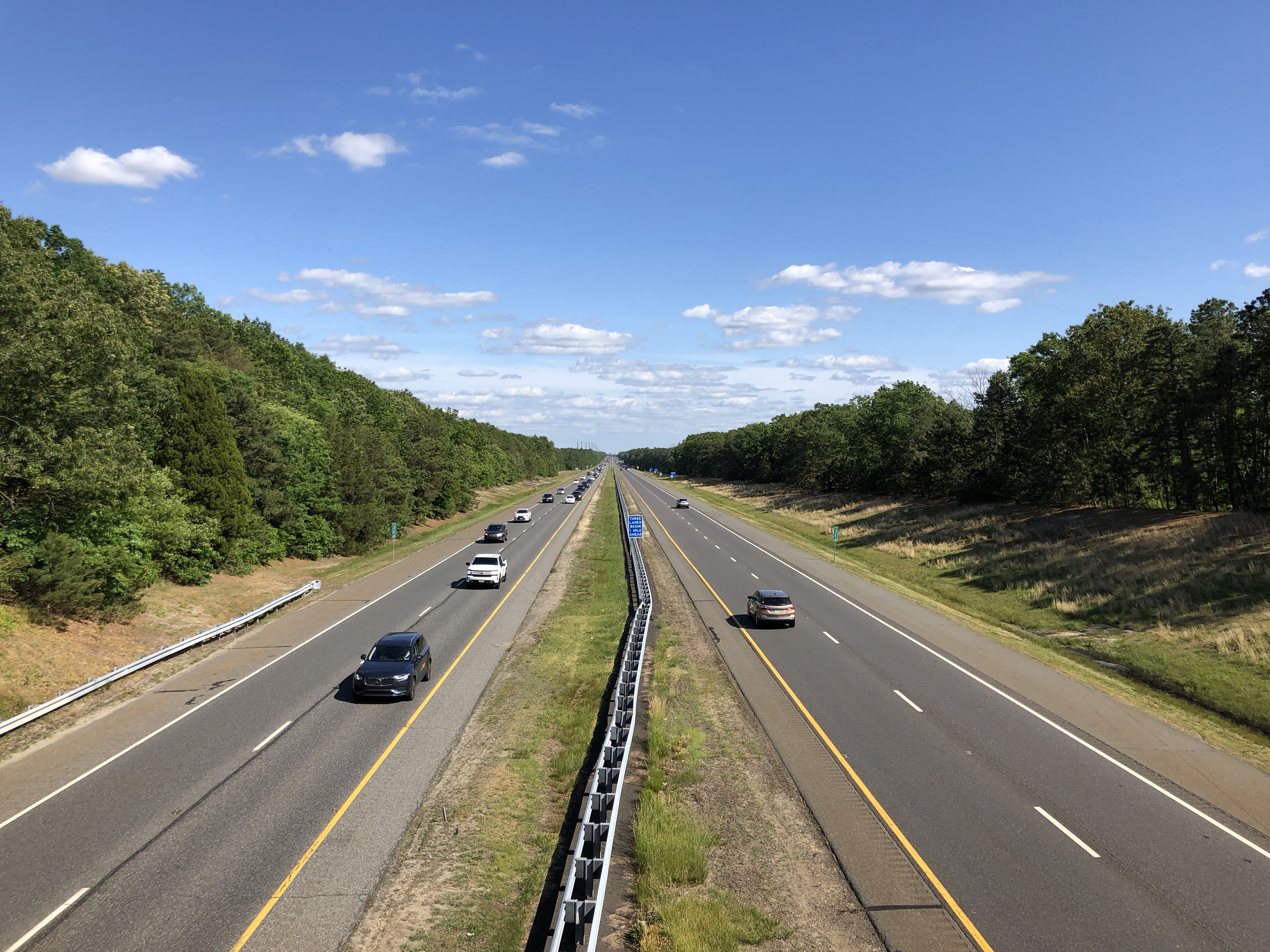
The eastbound Atlantic City Expressway in Winslow Township

=== Roads and highways ===
As of May 2010, the township had a total of 245.16 miles (394.55 km) of roadways, of which 159.89 miles (257.32 km) were maintained by the municipality, 57.57 miles (92.65 km) by Camden County and 16.50 miles (26.55 km) by the New Jersey Department of Transportation and 11.20 miles (18.02 km) by the South Jersey Transportation Authority.

Winslow is criss-crossed by several major roads. The most prominent of these, the Atlantic City Expressway, passes through the southwestern part of the township with four interchanges: Exits 41, 38, 33, and 31. Other major roads include U.S. Route 30, Route 73, and Route 143.

=== Public transportation ===
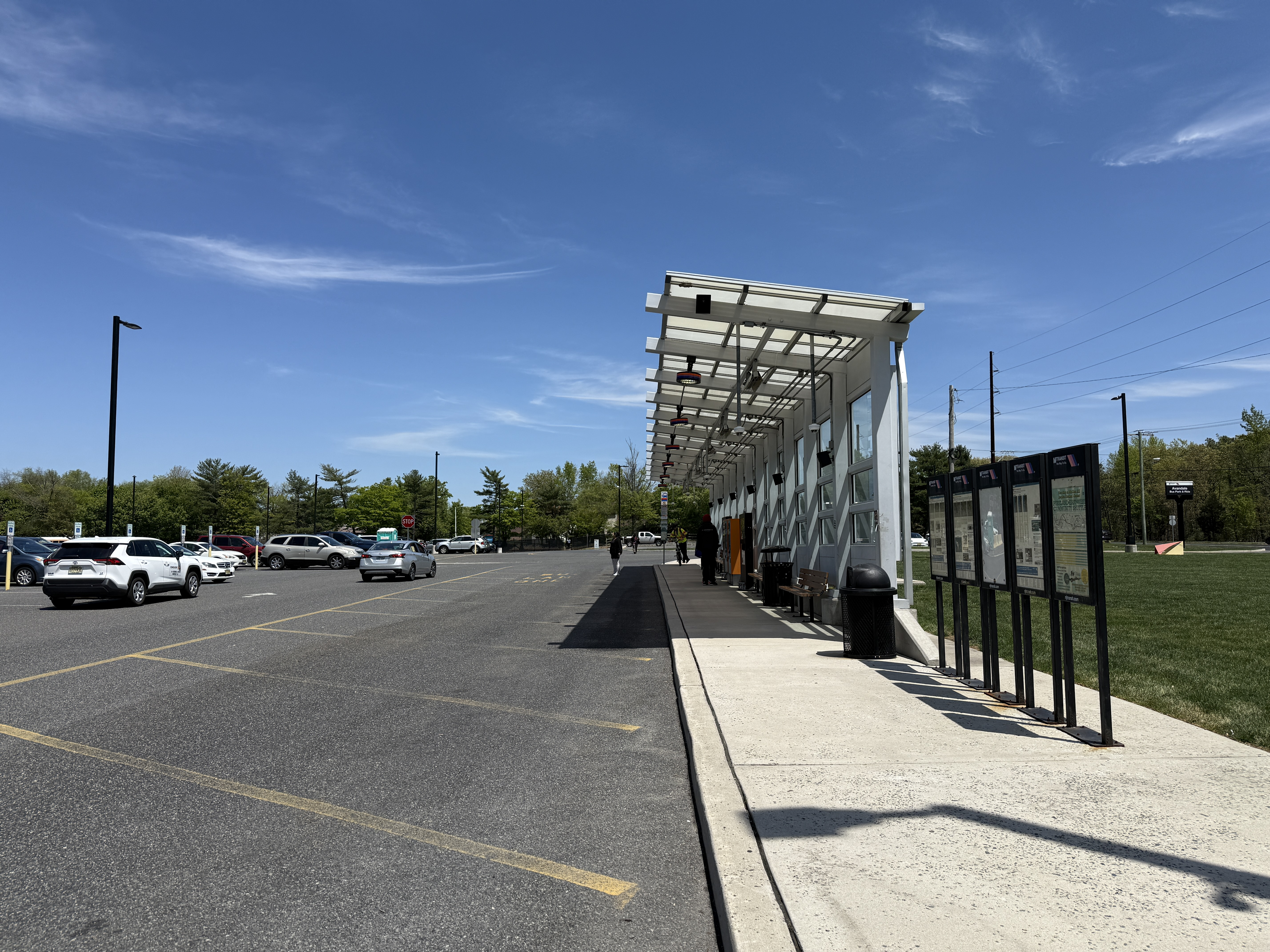
Avandale Park & Ride

NJ Transit bus service is available on the 316 with seasonal service between Cape May and Philadelphia and the 400 route between Sicklerville and Philadelphia. Local service is available on the 459 bus between Voorhees Town Center and the Avandale park-and-ride and the 463 route between Woodbury and the Avandale park-and-ride. Service to Atlantic City is offered on the 551 route to Philadelphia and on the 554 route to the Lindenwold station. There are no buses that provide service within reasonable walking distance to the Municipal Building.

Park and Ride bus service is located within the township at the Avandale park and ride, which offers 322 parking spots for NJ Transit passengers.

== Recreation ==
Great Times Day Camp is a summer camp for young children and teenagers located in the Waterford Works section of the township. It was founded in 1976 and is situated on Hobb Lake, one of Camden County's major reservoirs.

== Wineries ==
- Amalthea Cellars
- Sharrott Winery

== Notable people ==
People who were born in, residents of, or otherwise closely associated with Winslow Township include:

- Quinton Alston (born 1993), football linebacker who signed with the Tampa Bay Buccaneers
- Bill Belton (born 1992), running back
- Jessica Boyington (born 1985), Miss New Jersey USA 2006 and on-air television news personality at NBC News
- Jordan Burroughs (born 1988), Olympic Gold Medal wrestler
- Lee DeRamus (born 1972), former wide receiver who played for two seasons in the NFL with the New Orleans Saints
- Steven Ferrari (born 1962), US Army major general, lived in Winslow Township
- Ed Forchion (born 1964, known as NJWeedman), Rastafari cannabis rights and free speech activist who has been a frequent candidate for public office
- Shonn Greene (born 1985), running back for the Tennessee Titans
- Andrew K. Hay (1809–1881), represented New Jersey's 1st congressional district in the United States House of Representatives from 1849 to 1851
- Gordon Hill (born 1993), American football safety
- Kyle Hines (born 1986), professional basketball player who plays for CSKA Moscow of the VTB United League
- Tyler Hines (born 1990), professional basketball player
- Brandon Jones (born 1989), football cornerback
- Tziarra King (born 1998), professional soccer player who plays as a forward for National Women's Soccer League (NWSL) club Utah Royals FC
- Brendan McHugh (born 1990), swimmer who specializes in breaststroke events
- Mike Rozier (born 1961), former football Heisman Trophy-winning running back who played in the United States Football League and the National Football League
- Leroy Smith (born 1969), college football defensive end who played for the Iowa Hawkeyes football team
- Hakeem Valles (born 1992), tight end for the Arizona Cardinals
- Max Valles (born 1994), defensive end for the Buffalo Bills
