= Chesilhurst Borough School District =

Defunct school district in New Jersey, US

Coordinates: 39.727889°N 74.886968°W

Address
- 511 Edwards Avenue Chesilhurst, Camden County, New Jersey, 08089; United States

District information
- Grades: K-6
- Superintendent: Abdi Gass
- Business administrator: Frank Badessa
- Schools: 1

Students and staff
- Enrollment: 104 (as of 2007-08)
- Faculty: 8.0 FTEs
- Student–teacher ratio: 13.0

Other information
- District Factor Group: A
- Website: chesilhurstboe.org
Ind.	Per pupil	District spending	Rank (*)	K-6 average	%± vs. average
1	Budgetary Cost	17,601	55	12,195	44.3%
2	Classroom Instruction	9,842	52	7,366	33.6%
6	Support Services	2,783	49	1,832	51.9%
8	Administrative Cost	1,653	45	1,389	19.0%
10	Operations & Maintenance	2,098	52	1,472	42.5%
13	Extracurricular Activities	387	45	40	867.5%
16	Median Teacher Salary	54,206	37	52,691
Data from NJDoE 2009 Taxpayers' Guide to Education Spending. *Of K-6 districts with any number of students. Lowest spending=1; Highest=62

The Chesilhurst Borough School District is a defunct community public school district that had served students in Kindergarten through sixth grade from Chesilhurst, in the U.S. state of New Jersey. As of 2009, the district was no longer operating any schools and instead is sending all of its students to the Winslow Township School District as part of a sending/receiving relationship.

As of the 2007/08 school year, the district's one school had an enrollment of 104 students and 8.0 classroom teachers (on an FTE basis), for a student–teacher ratio of 13.0.

The district was classified by the New Jersey Department of Education as being in District Factor Group "A", the lowest of eight groupings. District Factor Groups organize districts statewide to allow comparison by common socioeconomic characteristics of the local districts. From lowest socioeconomic status to highest, the categories are A, B, CD, DE, FG, GH, I and J.

== Schools ==
- Shirley B. Foster Elementary School served 104 students as of the 2007-08 school year.

== Administration ==
Core members of the district's administration were:

- none, superintendent
- Frank Badessa, business administrator and board secretary
