= Monroe Township, Gloucester County, New Jersey =

Township in Gloucester County, New Jersey, US

Monroe Township, New Jersey
- Township
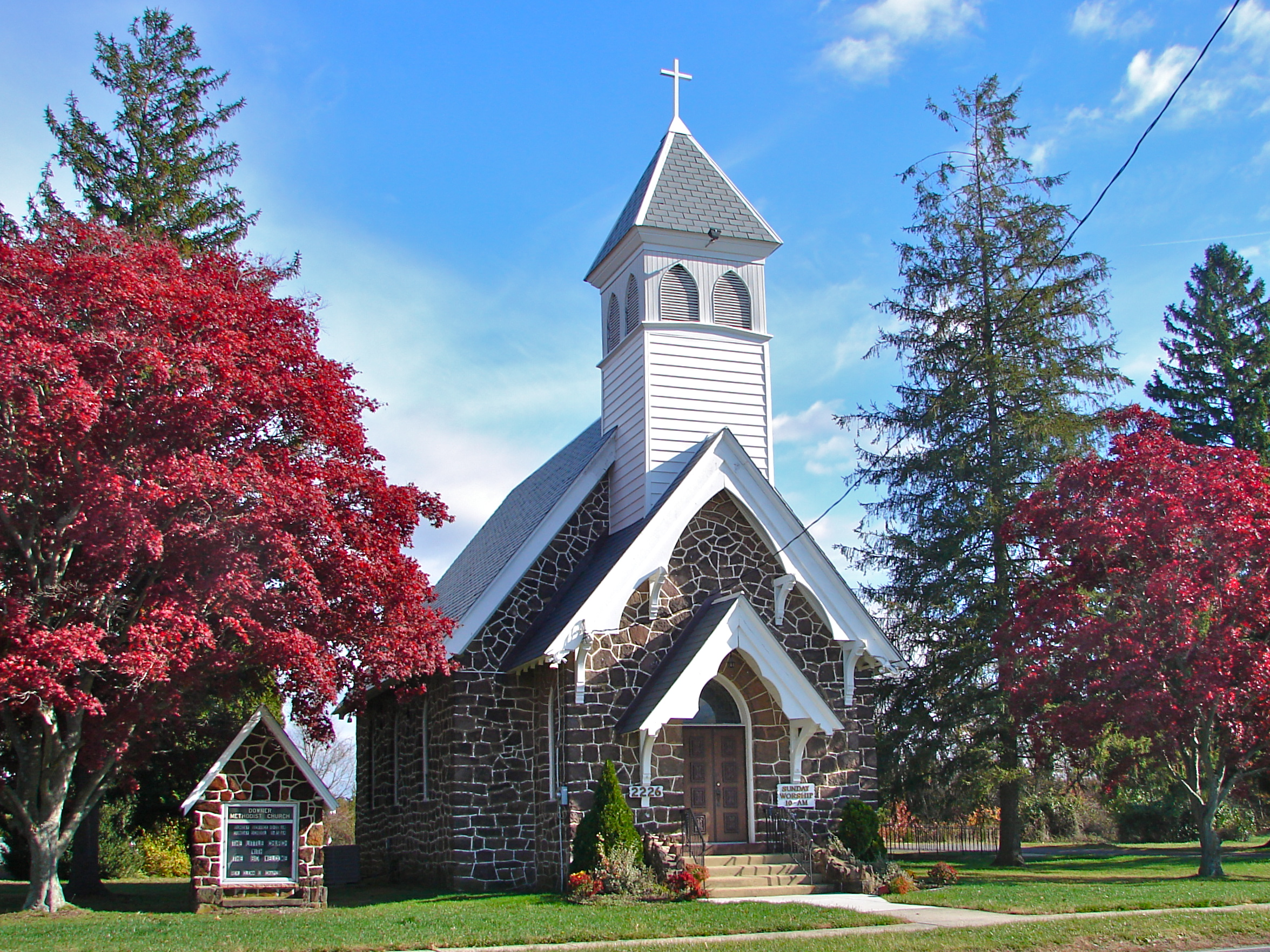
- Downer Methodist Episcopal Church in Monroe Township, November 2011

- Seal

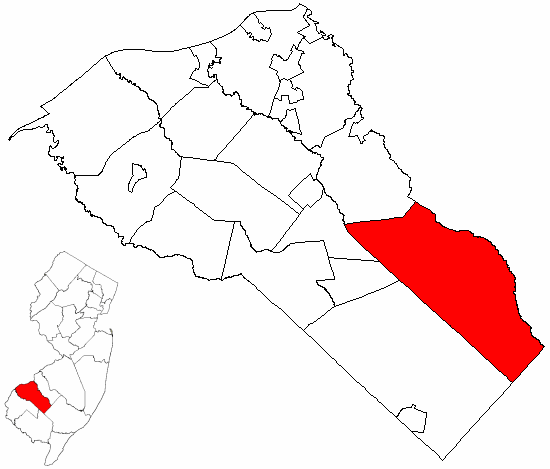
- Location of Monroe Township in Gloucester County highlighted in red (right). Inset map: Location of Gloucester County in New Jersey highlighted in red (left).

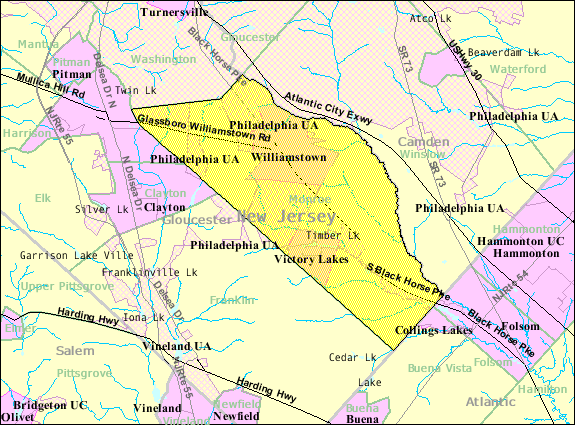
- Census Bureau map of Monroe Township, Gloucester County, New Jersey

- Location in Gloucester County Location in New Jersey Location in the United States
- Coordinates: 39.660224°N 74.969195°W
- Country: United States
- State: New Jersey
- County: Gloucester
- Incorporated: March 3, 1859
- Named for: President James Monroe

Government
  - Type: Faulkner Act (mayor–council)
  - Body: Township Council
  - Mayor: Gregory A. Wolfe (D, term ends December 31, 2026)
  - Administrator: James V. DeHart III
  - Municipal clerk: Aileen Chiselko

Area
  - Total: 46.93 sq mi (121.54 km^{2})
  - Land: 46.42 sq mi (120.23 km^{2})
  - Water: 0.51 sq mi (1.31 km^{2}) 1.08%
  - Rank: 36th of 565 in state 2nd of 24 in county
- Elevation: 121 ft (37 m)

Population (2020)
  - Total: 37,117
  - Estimate (2023): 37,752
  - Rank: 65th of 565 in state 2nd of 24 in county
  - Density: 799.6/sq mi (308.7/km^{2})
  - Rank: 408th of 565 in state 17th of 24 in county
- Time zone: UTC−05:00 (Eastern (EST))
  - Summer (DST): UTC−04:00 (Eastern (EDT))
- ZIP Code: 08094 – Williamstown
- Area codes: 609 and 856
- FIPS code: 3401547250
- GNIS feature ID: 0882137
- Website: www.monroetownshipnj.org

Monroe Township is a township in Gloucester County, in the U.S. state of New Jersey. As of the 2020 United States census, the township's population was 37,117, its highest decennial count ever and an increase of 988 (+2.7%) from the 36,129 recorded at the 2010 census, which in turn reflected an increase of 7,162 (+24.7%) from the 28,967 counted in the 2000 census. The township is part of the South Jersey region of the state and a suburb of Philadelphia, within the Philadelphia metropolitan area.

Monroe Township was originally formed as a township by an act of the New Jersey Legislature on March 3, 1859, from portions of Washington Township while the area was still part of Camden County. Monroe Township was shifted to Gloucester County on February 28, 1871, along with the majority of Washington Township. In 1950, portions of the township were transferred to Winslow Township in Camden County. The township was named for President James Monroe.

== Geography ==
According to the U.S. Census Bureau, the township had a total area of 46.93 square miles (121.54 km^{2}), including 46.42 square miles (120.23 km^{2}) of land and 0.51 square miles (1.31 km^{2}) of water (1.08%).

Victory Lakes (with a 2020 census population of 1,999) and Williamstown (15,082) are unincorporated communities and census-designated places located in Monroe Township.

Other unincorporated communities, localities, and places located partially or completely within the township include Berryland, Broad Lane, Cecil, Cross Keys, Downer, New Brooklyn and Radix.

The township borders the municipalities of Clayton, Franklin Township, Glassboro, and Washington Township in Gloucester County; Buena Vista Township and Folsom in Atlantic County; and Winslow Township in Camden County.

== Demographics ==
Historical population
Census	Pop.	Note	%±
1860	1,417		—
1870	1,663		17.4%
1880	1,858		11.7%
1890	1,945		4.7%
1900	2,402		23.5%
1910	3,015		25.5%
1920	3,292		9.2%
1930	4,064		23.5%
1940	4,310		6.1%
1950	5,531		28.3%
1960	9,396		69.9%
1970	14,071		49.8%
1980	21,639		53.8%
1990	26,703		23.4%
2000	28,967		8.5%
2010	36,129		24.7%
2020	37,117		2.7%
2023 (est.)	37,752		1.7%
Population sources: 1860–1870; 1880–2000 1860–1920; 1860–1870 1870 1880–1890; 1890–1910 1910–1930; 1940–2000 2000; 2010 2020

=== 2010 census ===
The 2010 United States census counted 36,129 people, 12,815 households, and 9,445 families in the township. The population density was 778.8 per square mile (300.7/km^{2}). There were 13,387 housing units at an average density of 288.6 per square mile (111.4/km^{2}). The racial makeup was 79.41% (28,689) White, 14.01% (5,060) Black or African American, 0.20% (73) Native American, 2.42% (875) Asian, 0.01% (5) Pacific Islander, 1.54% (557) from other races, and 2.41% (870) from two or more races. Hispanic or Latino of any race were 4.97% (1,795) of the population.

Of the 12,815 households, 34.7% had children under the age of 18; 56.2% were married couples living together; 12.6% had a female householder with no husband present and 26.3% were non-families. Of all households, 21.5% were made up of individuals and 9.7% had someone living alone who was 65 years of age or older. The average household size was 2.80 and the average family size was 3.28.

25.7% of the population were under the age of 18, 7.9% from 18 to 24, 26.0% from 25 to 44, 26.8% from 45 to 64, and 13.6% who were 65 years of age or older. The median age was 38.9 years. For every 100 females, the population had 94.1 males. For every 100 females ages 18 and older there were 90.0 males.

The Census Bureau's 2006–2010 American Community Survey showed that (in 2010 inflation-adjusted dollars) median household income was $66,761 (with a margin of error of +/− $4,083) and the median family income was $83,929 (+/− $4,293). Males had a median income of $61,505 (+/− $3,058) versus $41,946 (+/− $1,826) for females. The per capita income for the borough was $28,270 (+/− $1,121). About 6.1% of families and 7.7% of the population were below the poverty line, including 8.3% of those under age 18 and 10.1% of those age 65 or over.

=== 2000 census ===
As of the 2000 U.S. census, there were 28,967 people, 10,521 households, and 7,848 families residing in the township. The population density was 622.3 inhabitants per square mile (240.3/km^{2}). There were 11,069 housing units at an average density of 237.8 per square mile (91.8/km^{2}). The racial makeup of the township was 84.83% White, 11.15% African American, 0.25% Native American, 1.23% Asian, 0.03% Pacific Islander, 0.99% from other races, and 1.52% from two or more races. Hispanic or Latino of any race were 2.71% of the population.

There were 10,521 households, out of which 34.1% had children under the age of 18 living with them, 58.5% were married couples living together, 11.7% had a female householder with no husband present, and 25.4% were non-families. 21.0% of all households were made up of individuals, and 9.6% had someone living alone who was 65 years of age or older. The average household size was 2.73 and the average family size was 3.18.

In the township, the population was spread out, with 25.6% under the age of 18, 7.4% from 18 to 24, 30.0% from 25 to 44, 24.0% from 45 to 64, and 12.9% who were 65 years of age or older. The median age was 37 years. For every 100 females, there were 93.4 males. For every 100 females age 18 and over, there were 89.1 males.

The median income for a household in the township was $50,037, and the median income for a family was $56,810. Males had a median income of $41,062 versus $29,849 for females. The per capita income for the township was $20,488. About 4.0% of families and 6.2% of the population were below the poverty line, including 7.5% of those under age 18 and 7.1% of those age 65 or over.

== Sports ==
Scotland Run Golf Club is a public golf course and country club located in Williamstown. Opened in 1999, the 18-hole course was built on an old sand quarry. The course was named one of the Top 50 Public Courses in the country by the readers of Golf World in their annual Readers' Choice Awards in 2009 and 2010.

== Government ==
=== Local government ===
Monroe Township is governed within the Faulkner Act system of municipal government, formally known as the Optional Municipal Charter Law, under Mayor-Council (Plan F), enacted by direct petition as of January 1, 1971. The township is one of 71 municipalities (of the 564) statewide that use this form of government. The governing body of Monroe Township is comprised of the Mayor and the Township Council. The Mayor is directly elected to a four-year term of office. The Township Council is comprised of seven members, with three at-large seats and four seats selected from wards, all of whom serve four-year terms of office. Officials are chosen in partisan voting as part of the November general election in even-numbered years on a staggered basis, with the Mayor and the three council at-large seats up for vote together and two years later the four ward council seats.

As of 2025, the Mayor of Monroe Township is Democrat Gregory A. Wolfe, whose term of office ends December 31, 2026. Members of the Township Council are Denise Liszewski Adams (D, 2026; At Large), Brian Cope (D, 2024; Ward 3), Carolann Fox (D, 2028; Ward 2), Donald Heverly (D, 2026; At Large), Al Rossi (D, 2028; Ward 1), Patrick O'Reilly (D, 2026; At Large) and John Valentine (Republican, 2028; Ward 4).

In January 2019, Cody Miller was selected to fill the Ward 2 seat expiring in December 2020 that was vacated by Richard DiLucia when he took office as mayor. In the November 2019 general election, Miller was elected to serve the balance of the term of office.

In March 2022, Mayor Richard DiLucia switched parties and became a Republican, as did councilmembers Katherine Falcone and Steven McKinney.

=== Federal, state, and county representation ===
Monroe Township is located in the 1st Congressional District and is part of New Jersey's 4th state legislative district.

For the 119th United States Congress, New Jersey's 1st congressional district is represented by Donald Norcross (D, Camden). New Jersey is represented in the United States Senate by Democrats Cory Booker (Newark, term ends 2027) and Andy Kim (Moorestown, term ends 2031).

For the 2026–2027 session, the 4th legislative district of the New Jersey Legislature is represented in the State Senate by Paul D. Moriarty (D, Washington Township) and in the General Assembly by Dan Hutchison (D, Gloucester Township) and Cody Miller (D, Monroe Township).

Gloucester County is governed by a board of county commissioners, whose seven members are elected at-large to three-year terms of office on a staggered basis in partisan elections, with either two or three seats coming up for election each year. At a reorganization meeting held each January, the Board selects a Director and a Deputy Director from among its members. As of 2025, Gloucester County's Commissioners are:

Director Frank J. DiMarco (D, Deptford Township, 2025), Matt Weng (D, Pitman, 2026), Joann Gattinelli (D, Washington Township, 2026), Nicholas DeSilvio (R, Franklin Township, 2027), Denice DiCarlo (D, West Deptford Township, 2025) Deputy Director Jim Jefferson (D, Woodbury, 2026) and Christopher Konawel Jr. (R, Glassboro, 2027).

Gloucester County's constitutional officers are: Clerk James N. Hogan (D, Franklin Township; 2027), Sheriff Carmel Morina (D, Greenwich Township; 2027) and Surrogate Giuseppe "Joe" Chila (D, Woolwich Township; 2028).

=== Politics ===
United States presidential election results for Monroe Township 2024 2020 2016 2012 2008 2004
Year	Republican		Democratic		Third party(ies)	
Year	No.	%	No.	%	No.	%
2024	10,527	50.63%	9,960	47.90%	307	1.48%
2020	10,261	48.72%	10,487	49.79%	315	1.50%
2016	8,026	48.31%	8,060	48.52%	527	3.17%
2012	6,513	41.63%	8,986	57.44%	145	0.93%
2008	6,555	40.80%	9,296	57.86%	216	1.34%
2004	6,351	43.87%	7,994	55.21%	133	0.92%

As of March 2011, there were a total of 22,377 registered voters in Monroe Township, of which 9,900 (44.2%) were registered as Democrats, 3,413 (15.3%) were registered as Republicans and 9,051 (40.4%) were registered as Unaffiliated. There were 13 voters registered as Libertarians or Greens.

Gubernatorial election results for Monroe Township
Year	Republican		Democratic		Third party(ies)	
Year	No.	%	No.	%	No.	%
2025	7,493	46.51%	8,478	52.62%	140	0.87%
2021	6,398	54.29%	5,290	44.89%	97	0.82%
2017	3,411	39.83%	4,935	57.63%	217	2.53%
2013	5,182	62.42%	2,977	35.86%	143	1.72%
2009	4,304	47.50%	4,034	44.52%	723	7.98%
2005	3,289	40.09%	4,562	55.61%	353	4.30%

In the 2012 presidential election, Democrat Barack Obama received 57.4% of the vote (8,986 cast), ahead of Republican Mitt Romney with 41.6% (6,513 votes), and other candidates with 0.9% (145 votes), among the 15,767 ballots cast by the township's 23,556 registered voters (123 ballots were spoiled), for a turnout of 66.9%. In the 2008 presidential election, Democrat Barack Obama received 57.4% of the vote (9,296 cast), ahead of Republican John McCain with 40.5% (6,555 votes) and other candidates with 1.3% (216 votes), among the 16,193 ballots cast by the township's 22,994 registered voters, for a turnout of 70.4%. In the 2004 presidential election, Democrat John Kerry received 54.9% of the vote (7,994 ballots cast), outpolling Republican George W. Bush with 43.6% (6,351 votes) and other candidates with 0.6% (133 votes), among the 14,566 ballots cast by the township's 20,814 registered voters, for a turnout percentage of 70.0.

In the 2013 gubernatorial election, Republican Chris Christie received 62.4% of the vote (5,182 cast), ahead of Democrat Barbara Buono with 35.9% (2,977 votes), and other candidates with 1.7% (143 votes), among the 8,462 ballots cast by the township's 23,319 registered voters (160 ballots were spoiled), for a turnout of 36.3%. In the 2009 gubernatorial election, Republican Chris Christie received 47.0% of the vote (4,304 ballots cast), ahead of Democrat Jon Corzine with 44.0% (4,034 votes), Independent Chris Daggett with 7.2% (659 votes) and other candidates with 0.7% (64 votes), among the 9,165 ballots cast by the township's 22,698 registered voters, yielding a 40.4% turnout.

United States Senate election results for Monroe Township1
Year	Republican		Democratic		Third party(ies)	
Year	No.	%	No.	%	No.	%
2024	9,574	47.87%	10,188	50.94%	237	1.19%
2018	6,123	47.72%	6,232	48.57%	477	3.72%
2012	5,573	37.21%	9,085	60.66%	320	2.14%
2006	3,688	41.43%	4,948	55.59%	265	2.98%

United States Senate election results for Monroe Township2
Year	Republican		Democratic		Third party(ies)	
Year	No.	%	No.	%	No.	%
2020	9,823	47.50%	10,411	50.35%	445	2.15%
2014	3,780	42.84%	4,885	55.36%	159	1.80%
2013	2,201	45.80%	2,555	53.16%	50	1.04%
2008	5,573	37.56%	8,895	59.94%	371	2.50%

== Education ==
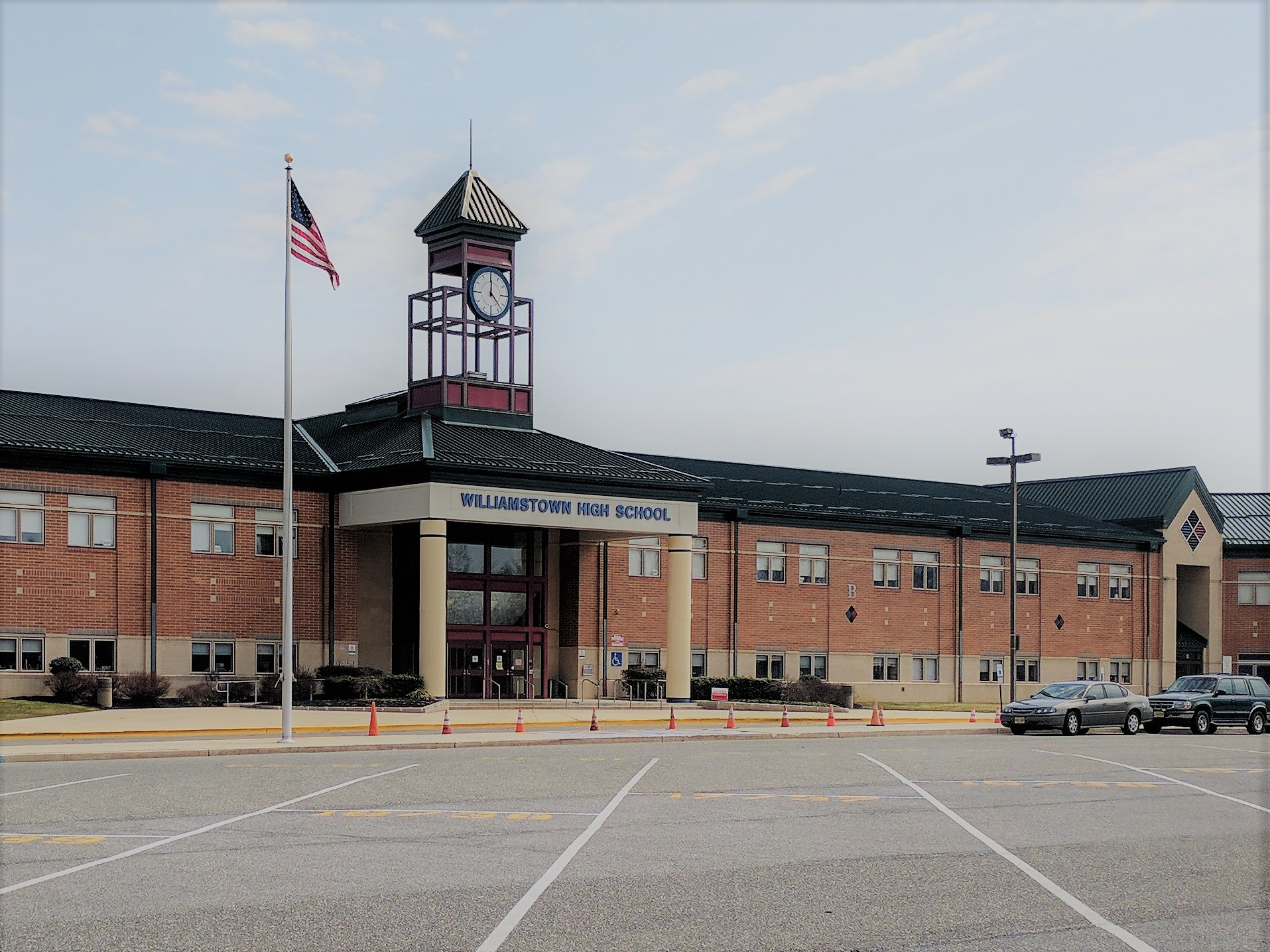
Main entrance to Williamstown High School

The Monroe Township Public Schools is a comprehensive district serving the educational needs of resident students from pre-kindergarten through twelfth grade. Services are also provided for preschool handicapped students as well as other students with special needs. As of the 2019–20 school year, the district, comprised of six schools, had an enrollment of 5,736 students and 449.2 classroom teachers (on an FTE basis), for a student–teacher ratio of 12.8:1. Schools in the district (with 2019–20 enrollment data from the National Center for Education Statistics) are Holly Glen Elementary School with 437 students in grades K–4, Oak Knoll Elementary School with 529 students in grades K–4, Radix Elementary School with 640 students in grades Pre-K–4, Whitehall Elementary School with 311 students in grades K–4, Williamstown Middle School, with 1,867 students in grades 5–8 and Williamstown High School with 1,837 students in grades 9–12.

Students from across the county are eligible to apply to attend Gloucester County Institute of Technology, a four-year high school in Deptford Township that provides technical and vocational education. As a public school, students do not pay tuition to attend the school.

St. Mary School is a K–8 elementary school that operates under the auspices of the Roman Catholic Diocese of Camden.

== Transportation ==
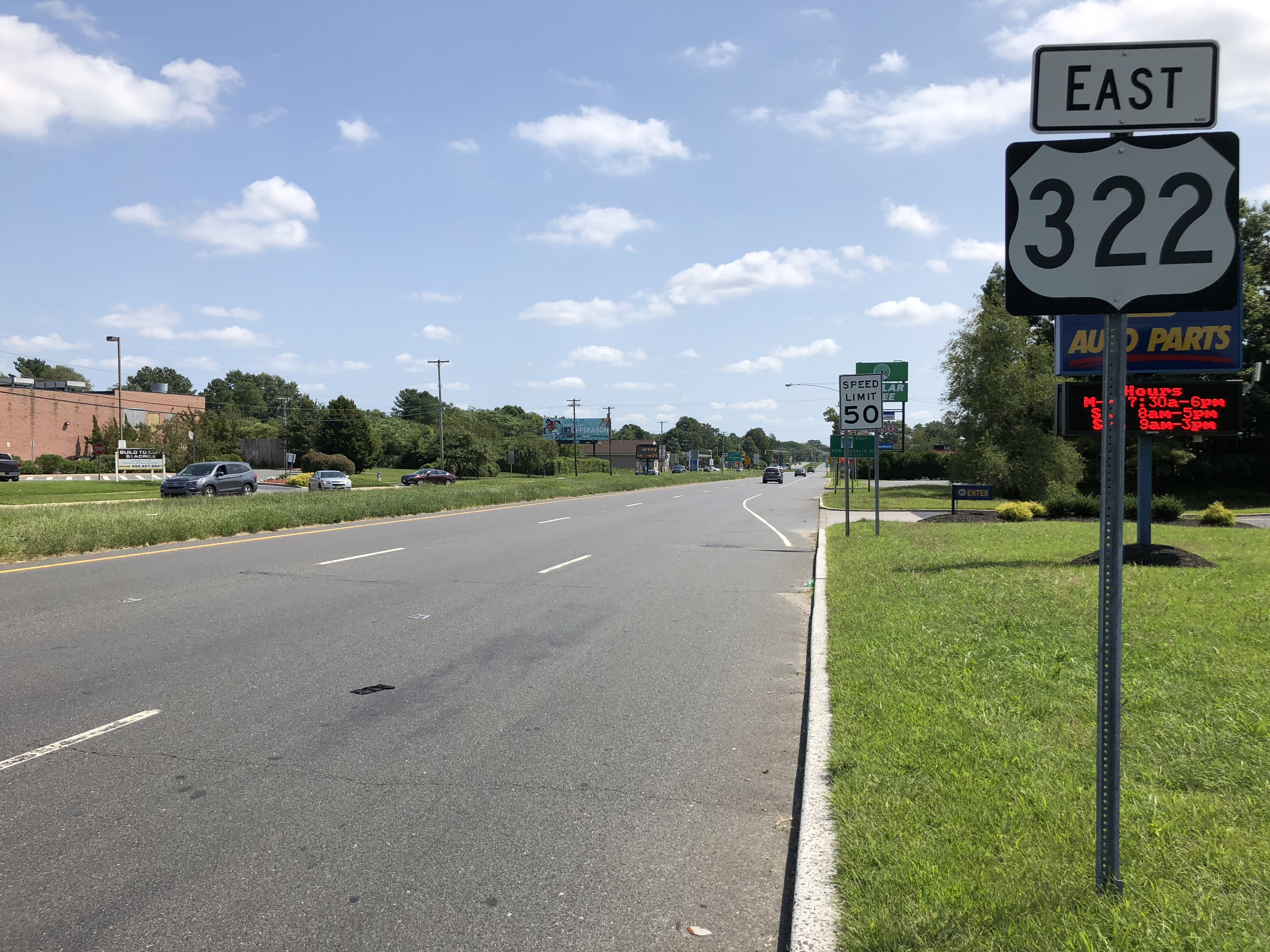
US 322 eastbound along Black Horse Pike in Monroe Township

=== Roads and highways ===
As of May 2010, the township had a total of 180.28 miles (290.13 km) of roadways, of which 131.72 miles (211.98 km) were maintained by the municipality, 32.30 miles (51.98 km) by Gloucester County and 16.26 miles (26.17 km) by the New Jersey Department of Transportation.

Black Horse Pike is a four-lane, arterial highway which traverses the entire township northwest-to-southeast and provides direct access to Philadelphia (30 minutes) and Atlantic City (35 minutes). The northwestern portion within the township is part of Route 42, while the southeastern segment forms the eastern portion of U.S. Route 322 within the township. The remainder of US 322 in Monroe Township is a two-lane arterial highway which traverses the township west of the Black Horse Pike. It provides access to the New Jersey Turnpike, north and south (30 minutes), with access to the Commodore Barry Bridge and Delaware Memorial Bridge to I-95 (40 minutes). Major county roads within the township include County Route 536, County Route 538, and County Route 555.

Running just outside the township is the Atlantic City Expressway, a four-lane, limited access highway that parallels the Black Horse Pike and provides direct access to Atlantic City (30 minutes) and access to the Garden State Parkway, north and south.

=== Public transportation ===
NJ Transit bus service is available between Cape May and Philadelphia on the 315 route and between Sicklerville and Philadelphia on the 400 route with local service on the 463 route between Woodbury and Avondale Park and Ride in Sicklerville.

Cross Keys Airport is located in the Cross Keys section.

== In popular culture ==
Musical groups from the township include Ju-Taun, a multi-cultural rhythm and blues male vocal group.

== Points of interest ==
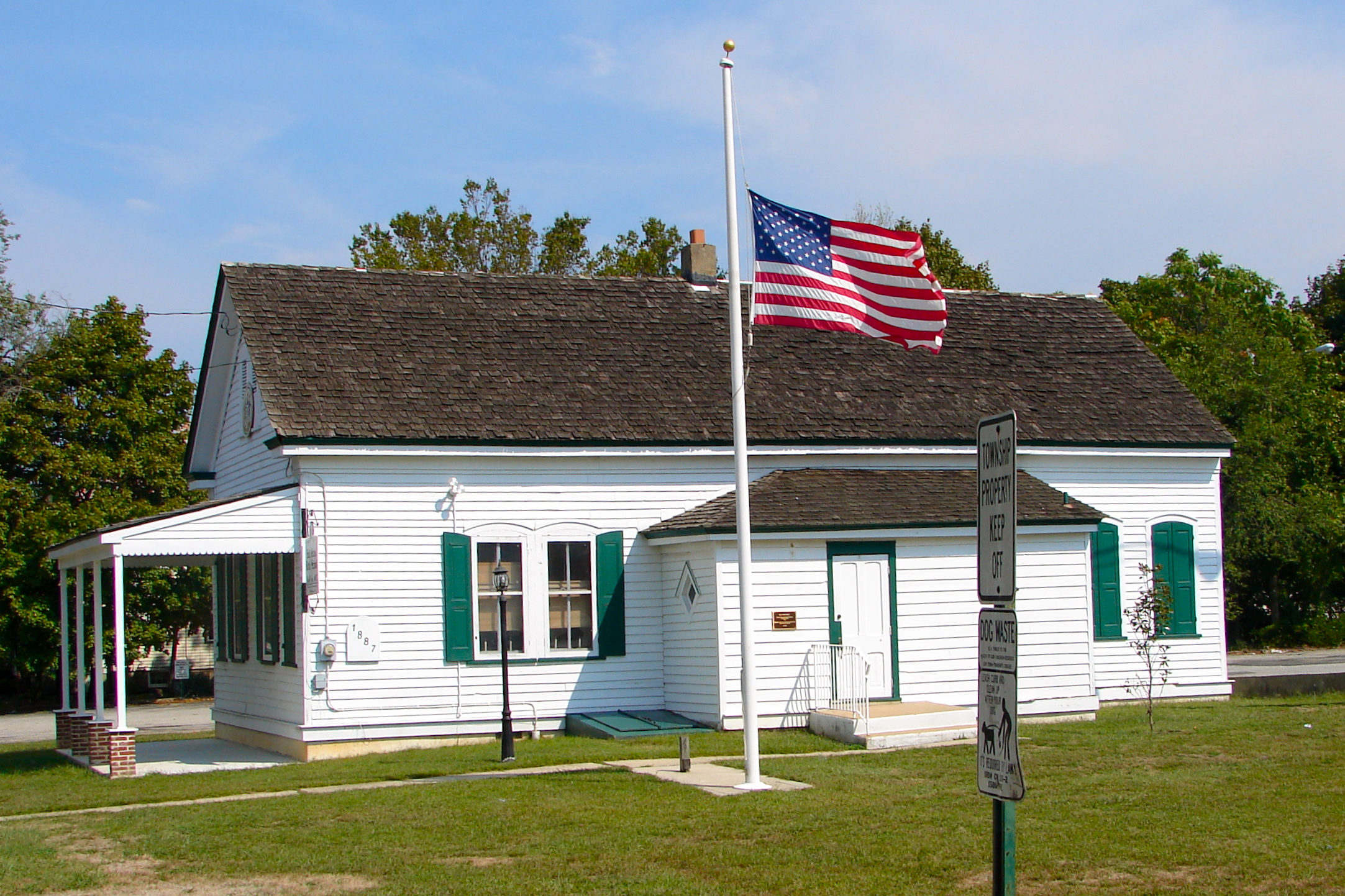
Hall Street School

Hall Street School was built in 1887 and was added to the National Register of Historic Places on September 27, 2006.

== Notable people ==
People who were born in, residents of, or otherwise closely associated with Monroe Township include:

- Raymond Arvidson, planetary scientist at Washington University in St. Louis, best known for his contributions to NASA missions to Mars, including as deputy director of the Mars Exploration Rovers
- Dave Calloway (born 1968), college basketball coach and the former head men's basketball coach at Monmouth University
- Danny Collins (born 1993), former professional football quarterback who played for the Ottawa Redblacks of the Canadian Football League
- Donovan Ezeiruaku (born 2003), American football defensive end for the Dallas Cowboys
- Cody Miller (born 1990), politician who represents the 4th legislative district in the New Jersey General Assembly since 2024
- Brittany Ratcliffe (born 1994), soccer player who plays as a forward for Seattle Reign FC in the National Women's Soccer League
- David A. Schauer (born 1961, class of 1979) radiation physicist
