= Jullian Taylor =

American football player (born 1995)

No. 77
- Position: Defensive end

Personal information
- Born: January 30, 1995 (age 31); Philadelphia, Pennsylvania, U.S.
- Listed height: 6 ft 5 in (1.96 m)
- Listed weight: 280 lb (127 kg)

Career information
- High school: Williamstown (Williamstown, New Jersey)
- College: Temple
- NFL draft: 2018: 7th round, 223rd overall pick

Career history
- San Francisco 49ers (2018–2020); Tennessee Titans (2021)*; Minnesota Vikings (2022)*
- * Offseason or practice squad member only

Career NFL statistics
- Total tackles: 16
- Fumble recoveries: 1
- Stats at Pro Football Reference

Jullian Taylor (born January 30, 1995) is an American former professional football player who was a defensive end for the San Francisco 49ers of the National Football League (NFL). Taylor played college football for the Temple Owls. He posted 41 tackles with 11 tackles for loss in 2017, his only season as a starter for the Owls. Taylor was selected by the 49ers in the seventh round of the 2018 NFL draft.

Taylor played prep football at Williamstown High School in Monroe Township, Gloucester County, New Jersey.

== Professional career ==
=== San Francisco 49ers ===
Taylor was selected by the San Francisco 49ers in the seventh round (223rd overall) of the 2018 NFL draft. The selection used to select Taylor was traded from the Miami Dolphins in a trade for Daniel Kilgore. During his rookie year in 2018, Taylor played 6 games with 7 tackles.

On December 28, 2019, Taylor was placed on injured reserve after suffering an anterior cruciate ligament injury in practice. Without Taylor, the 49ers reached Super Bowl LIV, but they lost 31–20 to the Kansas City Chiefs. He was placed on the active/physically unable to perform list (PUP) at the start of training camp on July 28, 2020, and was placed on the reserve/PUP list at the start of the regular season on September 5, 2020. On November 3, 2020, Taylor was waived from the PUP list by the 49ers with a failed physical designation.

=== Tennessee Titans ===
On February 25, 2021, Taylor signed with the Tennessee Titans. He was waived on June 3, 2021.

=== Minnesota Vikings ===
On April 7, 2022, Taylor signed with the Minnesota Vikings. He was waived/injured on August 22, 2022, and placed on injured reserve. He was released on August 30.
