= Ju-Taun =

American band

JUTAUN
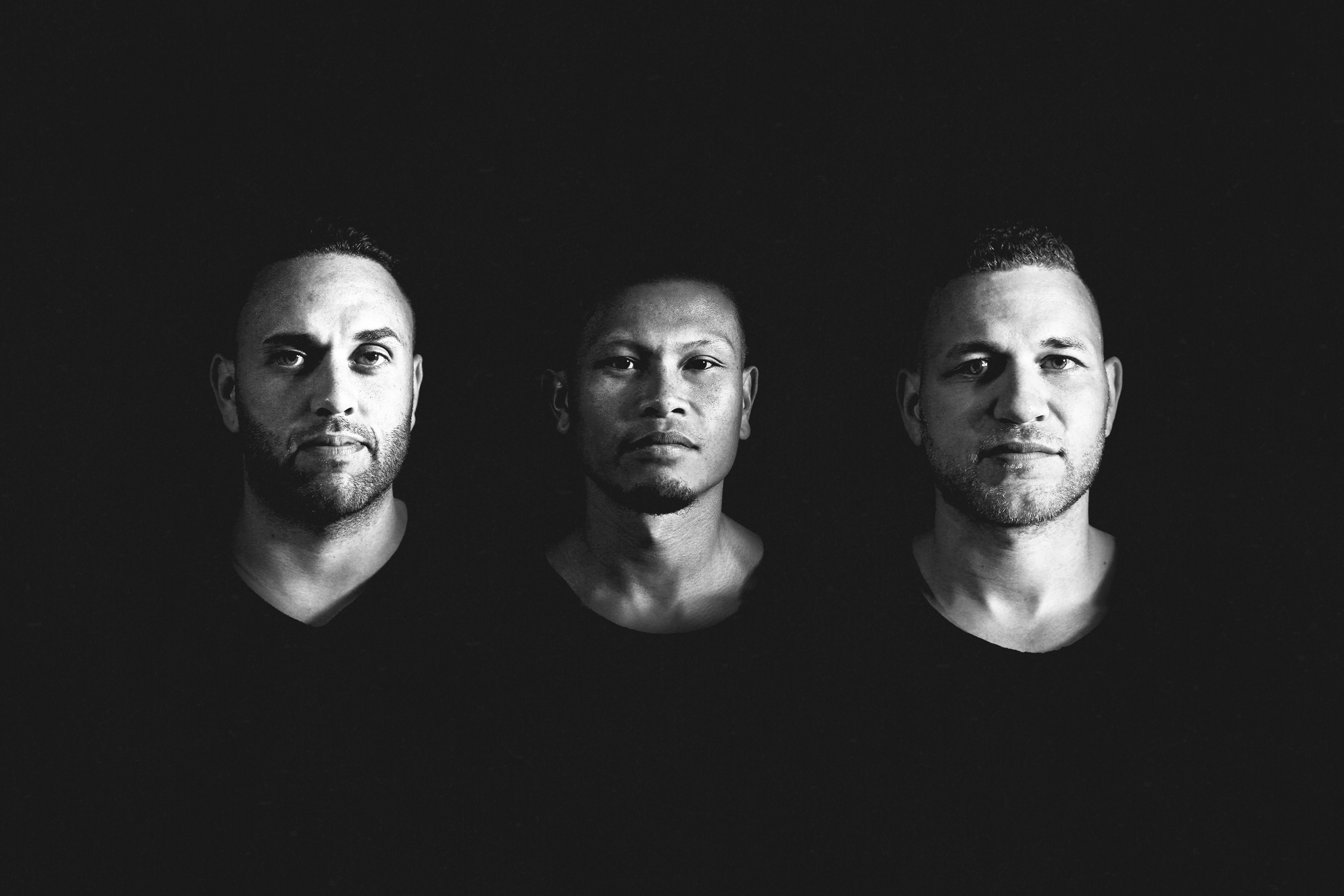

Background information
- Also known as: Ju-Taun
- Origin: Williamstown, New Jersey, United States
- Genres: Blues, R&B, soul, rock, pop, Contemporary Christian
- Years active: 1999–present
- Labels: Climax Entertainment, MAD Dragon Music Group
- Members: Jake Evans; James Evans; Samoeun Cheng; Stephen Honsberger; Carter Fox; Jordan Damiani; Michael Walker
- Past members: Anthony Lewis; Peter Garcia; Butch Serianni
- Website: http://jutaun.com/

JUTAUN (pronounced zha-táwn) is a band that began as a multi-cultural R&B male vocal group of high school friends from Monroe Township, Gloucester County, New Jersey. Brothers Jake and James Evans teamed with Anthony "Brian" Lewis, Peter Garcia, and Samoeun Cheng in early 1999. The father of Jake and James Evans, Jake Evans Jr., served as the group's vocal coach and mentor. He incorporated their sound with influences of classic R&B acts like The Temptations, Take 6, and Earth, Wind & Fire. As the band grew, Jake, James, and Samoeun recruited current members Stephen Honsberger, Carter Fox, Jordan Damiani, and Michael Walker.

== Biography ==
JUTAUN got their start by performing at talent shows and shopping malls in the Philadelphia and South Jersey area. In 2003 the group members quit their day jobs to pursue music full-time. They signed with friend and manager David Still and formed Climax Entertainment which is still based in Camden, NJ. The group began developing their business in diners and parking lots, but were soon able to acquire a full office space equipped with studios and rehearsal space. JUTAUN built up a fanbase organically by performing at waterfront venues, festivals and shopping centers. They followed every major concert tour, and performed outside the venues. Through their grassroots approach, they sold over 100,000 of their self-produced CD's. Their efforts gave them some attention, and soon promoters began booking them to open for established artists. Their earliest promotional appearances include the Ebony Family Reunion concerts, Crest Latin Shows, and the Pantene Total You Tour 2006.

Many of JUTAUN's radio singles including "Go Slow", "Let Me In", "Beautiful", and remake of Enchantment's "Sunshine" charted on internet and non-commercial stations, generating interests of mainstream audiences. JUTAUN was booked on the national BET Black College tour in the Summer and Fall of 2008 in support of educational outreach to minority students.

In mid-2009 JUTAUN appeared at B.B. Kings Blues Club & Grill in New York City and won "Best Male R&B Group" at the Underground Music Awards. The same year they were voted R&B Showcase Magazine's "Artist to Watch" and Billboard Magazine's "Top 10 New R&B Artist." Jutaun was selected to perform for MTV's Top Pop Group hosted by Mario Lopez. They competed against thousands of contestants, and finished second among nine finalists. They released a full-length album Love Changes Things in June 2009.

In 2010, the group regularly appeared on NBC Philadelphia's 10! Show to promote new music which emphasized a sound that they had been refining from their R&B days. The group spent the next few years working with various musicians while developing a new sound to break out of their pop-R&B past.

In 2012, JUTAUN announced their partnership with legendary producer, songwriter, and music industry icon Leon Huff, with whom they began production on their new album.

In 2013, the group, now a full band, released the single "By the River", executive produced by Huff, which currently exceeds 100,000 views on YouTube, has been spun on terrestrial radio across the world, and peaked at number 87 on Billboard's AAA chart as a release on the independent label Climax Entertainment. The vocal group, now made up of Jake, James, and Samoeun, decided to continue exploring and expanding their sound and formed a full-band featuring Stephen Honsberger on piano, guitar, and background vocals, Carter Fox on electric and upright bass, and Butch Serianni on drums and percussion.

On October 14, 2014, JUTAUN released the single "Come Closer".

On May 8, 2015, the band released the single "Who Am I" with an accompanying music video. The music video garnered much attention for the controversial message portrayed with the utilization of the Kuleshov Effect. Still riding the wave of attention they got from "Who Am I", the band released "Let it Die" on November 8, 2015. The track premiered on WXPN in Philadelphia and received airplay on various non-comm, AAA, and alternative radio stations throughout the United States and Europe. The band signed with Drexel University's student-run record label, MAD Dragon Music Group, to release their EP Back to Life on November 18, 2016. Drummer Butch Serianni mutually parted ways with the group in late 2016 to pursue his solo project ODDKIDOUT with the full support of the band, and continues to collaborate as producer, percussionist, and songwriter.

On February 2, 2018, the group independently released the live album Live Sessions, featuring live versions of songs from their 20 year history recorded during performances and recording sessions and featured the new single "Wishin' on Willows".

On September 3, 2018, JUTAUN released the reggae single "Young Lion" independently. It was followed up on February 22, 2019 with the single "Young Lion 2.0", a remixed version of 2018's song featuring rapper Aable. The band launched their own podcast, Young Lion TV, in March 2019 that broadcasts weekly covering a wide variety of topics from behind the scenes in the music industry to religion to politics and world events. The band continued released the single "Gold" on May 6, 2019, receiving praise from AAA and Non-Comm radio for its unique blend of African, rock, and soul genres. A re-recorded version of their 2013 hit "By the River" was released on March 2, 2020, to celebrate the 20th anniversary of the group being together as a group. The band was scheduled to perform with artist Freddie Jackson in Louisiana on March 13, 2020, but the show was postponed due to COVID-19 concerns.

During the COVID-19 pandemic, JUTAUN continued writing and recording new music, broadcasting their podcast, and streaming live performances put on in their recording studio and rehearsal space located in Camden, New Jersey. They released the single "Beautiful Eyes" on June 15, 2020, followed up by the single "Where Do We Go" on October 5, 2020. On April 5, 2021, the group released the single "Darlin".

The band spent much of 2022 working on new music inspired by their faith and announced a new album would be out late 2023/early 2024. On April 7, 2023, JUTAUN released the single "Release", followed up by the single "Open" on July 7, 2023. On September 15, 2023, they released the single "Grateful", which has been receiving international airplay on Christian radio.

JUTAUN continues to tour in support of their new release across the US, as well as touring internationally alongside Freddie Jackson as his backing band and opening act.

== Discography ==
Studio albums

- 2004: How Bad U Want It
- 2009: Love Changes Things

Extended plays

- 2003: It's Been A Long Time
- 2006: Say It
- 2016: Back to Life
- 2018: Live Sessions

Video

- 2007: "Go Slow"
- 2013: "By The River"
- 2015: "Wo Am I"

Singles

- 2013: "By the River"
- 2014: "Come Closer"
- 2015: "Who Am I"
- 2015: "Let It Die"
- 2016: "My Dear"
- 2018: "Wishin on Willows"
- 2018: "Young Lion"
- 2019: "Young Lion 2.0"
- 2019: "Gold"
- 2020: "By the River"
- 2020: "Beautiful Eyes"
- 2020: "Where Do We Go"
- 2021: "Darlin"
- 2023: "Release"
- 2023: "Open"
- 2023: "Grateful"

== Band members ==
Current members

- James Evans
- Jake Evans
- Samoeun Cheng
- Stephen Honsberger
- Carter Fox
- Jordan Damiani
- Michael Walker

Former members

- Anthony Lewis
- Peter Garcia
- Butch Serianni

== Awards ==
- Billboard Magazine's "Top 10 New R&B Artists 2009"
- "Best Male R&B Group" at the Underground Music Awards 2009
- R&B Showcase Magazine's "Artists To Watch 2009"
- "MTV's Top Pop Group Personality Award"
- "Best Male R&B Group" at the Underground Music Awards 2005
