= Williamstown High School (New Jersey) =

High school in Gloucester County, New Jersey, US

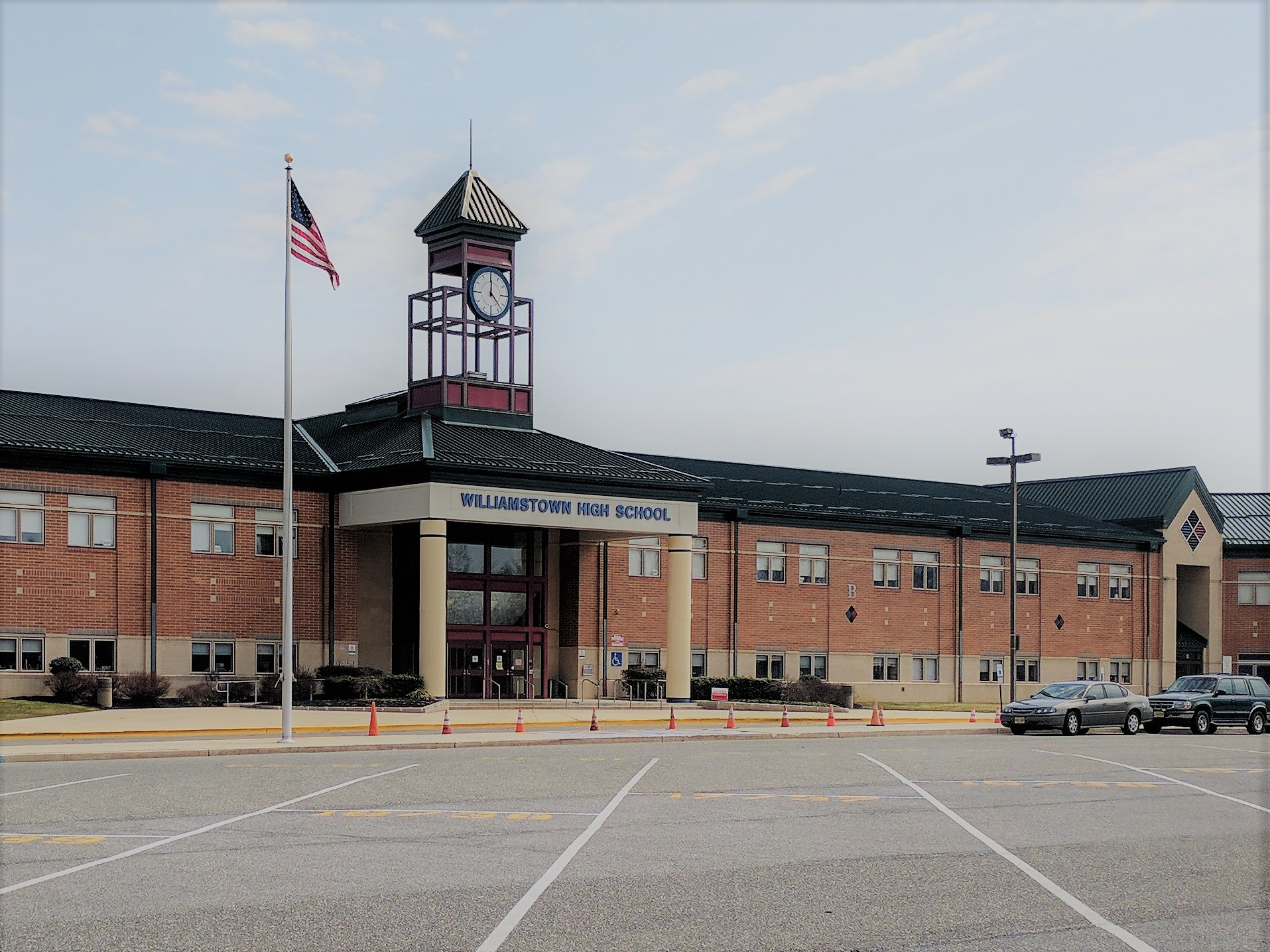

Location
- 700 North Tuckahoe Road; Monroe Township, Gloucester County, New Jersey 08094; United States
- Coordinates: 39.682829°N 75.017925°W

Information
- Type: Public high school
- Established: 1958
- School district: Monroe Township Public Schools
- NCES School ID: 341047002594
- Principal: Angelo DeStefano
- Faculty: 125.8 FTEs
- Grades: 9-12
- Enrollment: 1,773 (as of 2023–24)
- Student to teacher ratio: 14.1:1
- Colors: Royal Blue and white
- Athletics conference: Tri-County Conference (general); West Jersey Football League (football)
- Team name: Braves
- Website: whs.monroetwp.k12.nj.us

Williamstown High School is a four-year comprehensive community public high school located in the Williamstown section of Monroe Township in Gloucester County, in the U.S. state of New Jersey, serving students in ninth through twelfth grades as the lone secondary school of the Monroe Township Public Schools. The school was established in 1958.

As of the 2023–24 school year, the school had an enrollment of 1,773 students and 125.8 classroom teachers (on an FTE basis), for a student–teacher ratio of 14.1:1. There were 468 students (26.4% of enrollment) eligible for free lunch and 122 (6.9% of students) eligible for reduced-cost lunch.

== Construction ==
The high school was designed to handle an initial enrollment of 800 students when it was to open for the 1958-59 school year and was constructed at a cost of $1.3 million (equivalent to $14.5 million in 2025). Prior to the opening of the high school, students from Monroe Township had attended Glassboro High School. The ending of the sending/receiving relationship with the Glassboro Public Schools was expected to cut the cost of educating high-school students by almost 25%.

Construction on the current school building began in 1994 and was completed in 1997. Prior to 1997, Williamstown High School was located in what is currently Williamstown Middle School. The school mascot is a Brave and the school colors are Royal Blue and White.

Construction began again during the 2007-2008 school year on the high school to build an additional two wings because of overcrowding and to build a new auxiliary gym/dance studio. A few renovations in the existing building were also done to replace some old piping, wiring, and the gym and stage floor. The construction was completed between December 2008 and January 2009.

== Awards, recognition and rankings ==
The school was the 257th-ranked public high school in New Jersey out of 339 schools statewide in New Jersey Monthly magazine's September 2014 cover story on the state's "Top Public High Schools", using a new ranking methodology. The school had been ranked 295th in the state of 328 schools in 2012, after being ranked 270th in 2010 out of 322 schools listed. The magazine ranked the school 259th in 2008 out of 316 schools. The school was ranked 248th out of 316 public high schools in New Jersey in the magazine's 2006 rankings. Schooldigger.com ranked the school 194th out of 381 public high schools statewide in its 2011 rankings (a decrease of 29 positions from the 2010 ranking) which were based on the combined percentage of students classified as proficient or above proficient on the two components of the High School Proficiency Assessment (HSPA), mathematics (79.6%) and language arts literacy (91.4%).

== Athletics ==
The Williamstown High School Braves compete as one of the member schools in the Tri-County Conference, which is comprised of public and private high schools located in Camden, Cape May, Cumberland, Gloucester and Salem counties. The conference is overseen by the New Jersey State Interscholastic Athletic Association (NJSIAA). With 1,426 students in grades 10-12, the school was classified by the NJSIAA for the 2019–20 school year as Group IV for most athletic competition purposes, which included schools with an enrollment of 1,060 to 5,049 students in that grade range. The football team competes in the American Division of the 94-team West Jersey Football League superconference and was classified by the NJSIAA as Group V South for football for 2024–2026, which included schools with 1,333 to 2,324 students.

Sports offered at the school include:

- Fall Sports: Cheerleading, Cross Country, Football, Field Hockey, Boys' Soccer, Girls' Soccer, Girls' Tennis, Girls' Volleyball
- Winter Sports: Wrestling, Track, Swimming and Diving, Ice Hockey, Basketball, Cheerleading (Note: Ice Hockey is a separate club sport. Williamstown is a member of the South Jersey High School Ice Hockey League, and competes in Varsity Tier I)
- Spring Sports: Girls' and Boys' Spring Track, Boys' Baseball, Girls' Softball, Golf, Boys' Tennis and Boys' Volleyball, Girls' and Boys' Lacrosse

The girls team won the NJSIAA spring / outdoor track Group II title in 1981 and 1982, and won the Group III title in 1995 and 1996.

The boys track team won the Group III spring / outdoor track state championship in 1984 (as co-champion).

The girls volleyball team won the Group III state championship in 2006 (defeating West Morris Central High School in the final match) and won the Group IV title in 2010 (vs. Livingston High School), 2012 (vs. Hunterdon Central Regional High School) and 2019 (vs. North Hunterdon High School) The team won the 2006 Group III state championship, two games to none (25-20 and 26-24) over West Morris Central High School. Their victory was the team's first State title and made them only the third South Jersey team to win a girl's state title in the sport, joining Eastern High School and Cherry Hill High School East. The girls team finished the 2010 season with a record of 30-2, capped off by winning the Group IV title in two games, defeating Livingston High School to earn the program's second state title. The 2019 team won the Group III title in two games against North Hunterdon (25-17 and 30-28) and advanced to the Tournament of Champions as the second seed, falling in the semifinals to third-seeded West Morris Mendham High School in two games (25-17 and 27-25) to finish the season with a record of 30-3.

The softball team won the Group IV state championship in 2008 (defeating Ridgewood High School in the final round of the tournament) and 2009 (vs. Union High School). The 2008 team defeated Toms River High School East to win the South Jersey, Group IV state sectional championship, with a 2-0 win in the tournament final. The team won the Group IV title with a 1-0 win over Old Bridge High School in the semifinals and finished the season with a 26-1 record after a 2-0 win against Ridgewood in the finals. Williamstown was ranked as the number one softball team in New Jersey and number 25th ranked team in the nation in the USA Today final 2008 rankings. NJ.com / The Star-Ledger ranked Williamstown as their number-one softball team in the state in 2008. In spring 2009 the Williamstown softball team again defeated Toms River High School East to win the South Jersey, Group IV state sectional championship, with a three-run walk-off home run in the bottom of the eleventh inning. The team repeated as Group IV State Champions when they defeated Union High School by a final score of 3-0, allowing only one hit.

The girls' spring track team won Tri-County Championships in 2009.

The football team won the South Jersey Group V state sectional championship in 2012, 2018 and 2019. The team won the 2018 South Jersey Group V state sectional title with a 56-20 win against Rancocas Valley Regional High School. The team won the 2019 South Jersey Group V title with a 14-10 win against Lenape High School with a 14-10 win in the championship game and went on to win the South /Central Group V championship against Lenape High School by a score of 30-14 in the bowl game.

In 2015, the Williamstown baseball team defeated Cherokee High School by a score of 4-1 in the tournament final to win the South Jersey Group IV state sectional championship

== Marching band ==
The school's marching band was Tournament of Bands Chapter One Champions in 2003 and 2007 (Group 1) and 2005-06 (Group 2). The band was the 2003 Atlantic Coast Champion in Group 1 and the 2000 Atlantic Coast Invitational Champion in Group 2. The Band was 2010 USSBA "National" Champions, winning best percussion, effect, visual, and music. Since the change of director in 2012, the Williamstown Marching Braves has been on a steady increase. The Marching Braves' Percussion Section won the USBands "National" Championship in 2014 and the band placed 2nd overall, missing first place by only .063 points. The Williamstown Indoor Percussion Ensemble which competes in the TIA (Tournament of Bands) indoor percussion circuit was promoted to the National A Class during their 2015 season after their performance at Avon Grove High School March 14, 2015 and their performance at the WGI (Winter Guard International) regional at Unionville High School (Unionville, PA).

== Administration ==
The school's principal is Angelo DeStefano. His administration team includes five assistant principals.

== Notable alumni ==
- Raymond Arvidson (class of 1965), Professor of Earth and Planetary Sciences at Washington University in St. Louis, best known for his contributions to NASA missions to Mars, including as deputy director of the Mars Exploration Rovers
- Danny Collins (born 1993), former professional football quarterback who played for the Ottawa Redblacks of the Canadian Football League
- Donovan Ezeiruaku (born 2003), American football defensive end for the Dallas Cowboys
- Keon Sabb (born 2002), American football safety for the Michigan Wolverines
- David A. Schauer (born 1961, class of 1979), radiation physicist
- Jullian Taylor (born 1995), American football defensive end who played in the NFL for the San Francisco 49ers
- Leroy Thompson (born 1971), former fullback / linebacker who played in the Arena Football League for 13 seasons
- Brett Wichrowski (born 2002), professional baseball player
