= Cody Miller (politician) =

American politician

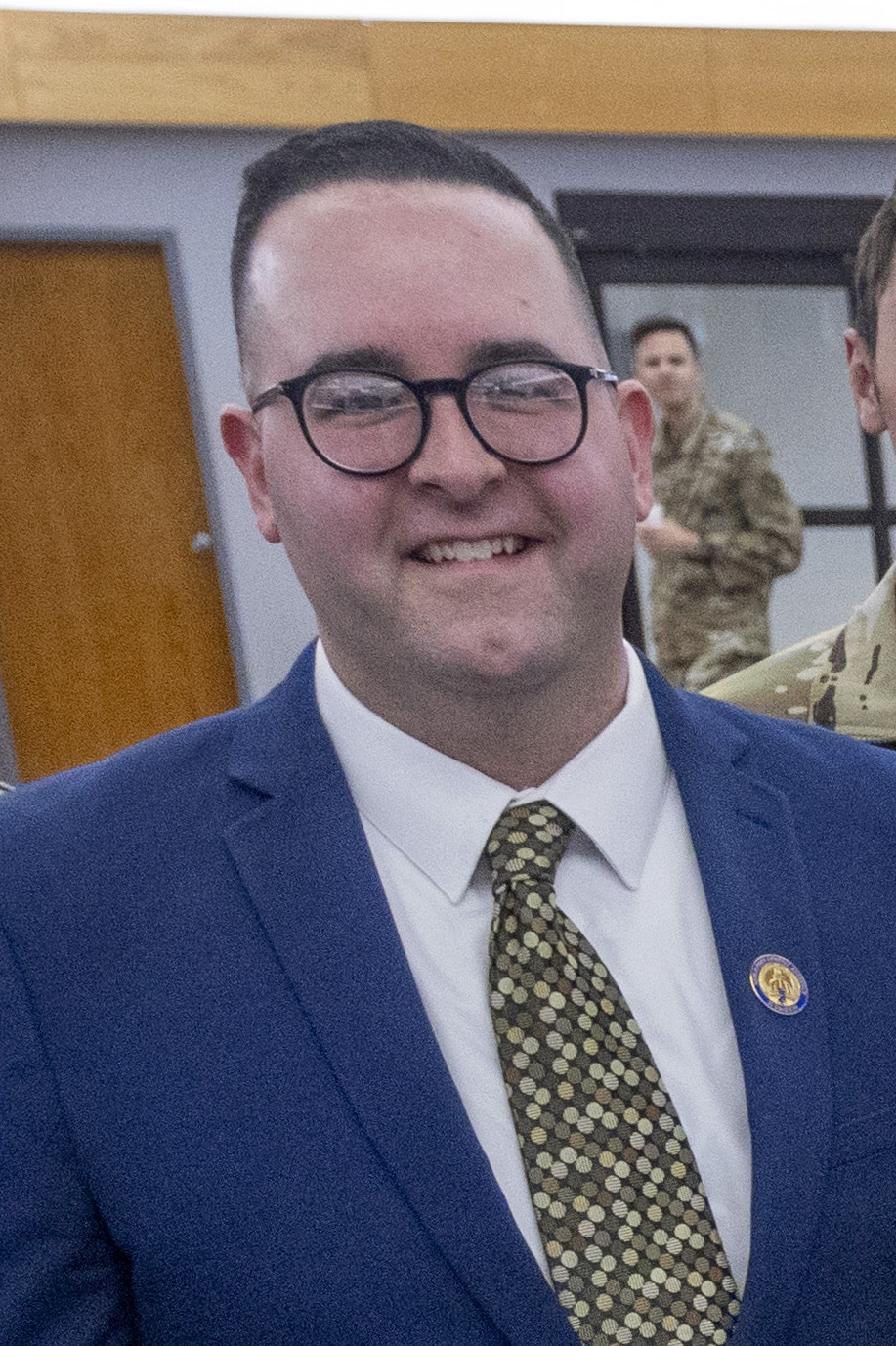
- Miller in 2024

Member of the New Jersey General Assembly from the 4th district
- Incumbent
- Assumed office January 9, 2024 Serving with Dan Hutchison
- Preceded by: Paul D. Moriarty; Gabriela Mosquera

Personal details
- Born: December 12, 1990 (age 35)
- Party: Democratic
- Education: Rowan College of South Jersey; Rutgers University–Camden

Cody Miller (born December 12, 1990) is an American Democratic Party politician serving as a member of the New Jersey General Assembly for the 4th legislative district. Miller took office on January 9, 2024.

== Biography ==
A resident of Monroe Township, Gloucester County, New Jersey, Miller graduated from Gloucester County College (since renamed as Rowan College of South Jersey) and Rutgers University-Camden. He is employed as director of foundation and alumni relations at Rowan College of South Jersey.

== Elective office ==
In January 2019, Miller was selected to fill the Monroe Township Council Ward 2 seat expiring in December 2020 that had been vacated by Richard DiLucia when he took office as the township's mayor. In the November 2019 general election, Miller was elected to serve the balance of the term of office.

Miller served on the board of education of the Monroe Township Public Schools.

Led by Paul D. Moriarty, who was running for the New Jersey Senate seat vacated by Fred Madden, Miller and his Democratic running mate Dan Hutchison, defeated Republicans Amanda Esposito and Matthew P. Walker in the 2023 New Jersey General Assembly election. At the age of 32, Miller is the youngest member of the Assembly and is the first New Jersey legislator born in the 1990s.

== District 4 ==
Each of the 40 districts in the New Jersey Legislature has one representative in the New Jersey Senate and two members in the New Jersey General Assembly. The representatives from the 4th District for the 2024—2025 Legislative Session are:

- Senator Paul D. Moriarty (D)
- Assemblyman Dan Hutchison (D)
- Assemblyman Cody Miller (D)

== Electoral history ==
4th Legislative District General Election, 2023
Party	Candidate	Votes	%
Democratic	Dan Hutchison	30,116	26.5
Democratic	Cody D. Miller	29,770	26.2
Republican	Amanda Esposito	26,653	23.5
Republican	Matthew P. Walker	25,881	22.8
Conservatives South Jersey	Maureen Dukes Penrose	1,145	1.0
Total votes		113,565	100.0
Democratic hold			
