= Victory Lakes, New Jersey =

Populated place in Gloucester County, New Jersey, US

- Census-designated place
- Map of Victory Lakes highlighted within Gloucester County. Right: Location of Gloucester County in New Jersey.

- Location in Gloucester County Location in New Jersey Location in the United States
- Coordinates: 39.630558°N 74.969218°W
- Country: United States
- State: New Jersey
- County: Gloucester
- Township: Monroe

Area
  - Total: 2.54 sq mi (6.59 km^{2})
  - Land: 2.42 sq mi (6.28 km^{2})
  - Water: 0.12 sq mi (0.31 km^{2}) 4.72%
- Elevation: 130 ft (40 m)

Population (2020)
  - Total: 1,999
  - Density: 824.5/sq mi (318.35/km^{2})
- Time zone: UTC−05:00 (Eastern (EST))
  - Summer (DST): UTC−04:00 (EDT)
- FIPS code: 34-75920
- GNIS feature ID: 02390433

Victory Lakes is an unincorporated community and census-designated place (CDP) located within Monroe Township, in Gloucester, in the U.S. state of New Jersey. As of the 2020 census, Victory Lakes had a population of 1,999.

== Geography ==
According to the United States Census Bureau, the CDP had a total area of 2.521 square miles (6.53 km^{2}), including 2.402 square miles (6.22 km^{2}) of land and 0.119 square miles (0.31 km^{2}) of water (4.72%).

== Demographics ==
Historical population
Census	Pop.	Note	%±
1990	2,160		—
2000	2,118		−1.9%
2010	2,111		−0.3%
2020	1,999		−5.3%
Population sources: 1950 1960 1970; 1980 1990 2000; 2010

Victory Lakes first appeared as a census designated place in the 1990 U.S. census.

=== 2020 census ===
Victory Lakes CDP, New Jersey – Racial and ethnic composition Note: the US Census treats Hispanic/Latino as an ethnic category. This table excludes Latinos from the racial categories and assigns them to a separate category. Hispanics/Latinos may be of any race.
Race / Ethnicity (NH = Non-Hispanic)	Pop 2000	Pop 2010	Pop 2020	% 2000	% 2010	% 2020
White alone (NH)	1,900	1,865	1,618	89.71%	88.35%	80.94%
Black or African American alone (NH)	102	105	88	4.82%	4.97%	4.40%
Native American or Alaska Native alone (NH)	6	4	2	0.28%	0.19%	0.10%
Asian alone (NH)	18	20	18	0.85%	0.95%	0.90%
Native Hawaiian or Pacific Islander alone (NH)	0	1	0	0.00%	0.05%	0.00%
Other race alone (NH)	2	2	20	0.09%	0.09%	1.00%
Mixed race or Multiracial (NH)	23	39	103	1.09%	1.85%	5.15%
Hispanic or Latino (any race)	67	75	150	3.16%	3.55%	7.50%
Total	2,118	2,111	1,999	100.00%	100.00%	100.00%

=== 2010 census ===
The 2010 United States census counted 2,111 people, 738 households, and 568 families in the CDP. The population density was 878.9 people per square mile (339.3 people/km^{2}). There were 779 housing units at an average density of 324.3 units per square mile (125.2 units/km^{2}). The racial makeup was 90.29% (1,906) White, 5.16% (109) Black or African American, 0.19% (4) Native American, 0.95% (20) Asian, 0.05% (1) Pacific Islander, 0.76% (16) from other races, and 2.61% (55) from two or more races. Hispanic or Latino of any race were 3.55% (75) of the population.

Of the 738 households, 30.8% had children under the age of 18; 57.6% were married couples living together; 13.4% had a female householder with no husband present and 23.0% were non-families. Of all households, 16.7% were made up of individuals and 5.6% had someone living alone who was 65 years of age or older. The average household size was 2.85 and the average family size was 3.21.

22.5% of the population were under the age of 18, 10.1% from 18 to 24, 26.3% from 25 to 44, 28.8% from 45 to 64, and 12.2% who were 65 years of age or older. The median age was 39.7 years. For every 100 females, the population had 100.9 males. For every 100 females ages 18 and older there were 98.4 males.

=== 2000 census ===
As of the 2000 United States census there were 2,118 people, 718 households, and 592 families living in the CDP. The population density was 340.7 people/km^{2} (882 people/mi^{2}). There were 756 housing units at an average density of 121.6 units/km^{2} (315 units/mi^{2}). The racial makeup of the CDP was 91.55% White, 5.00% African American, 0.28% Native American, 0.90% Asian, 0.90% from other races, and 1.37% from two or more races. Hispanic or Latino of any race were 3.16% of the population.

There were 718 households, out of which 36.9% had children under the age of 18 living with them, 63.1% were married couples living together, 13.4% had a female householder with no husband present, and 17.5% were non-families. 13.8% of all households were made up of individuals, and 4.5% had someone living alone who was 65 years of age or older. The average household size was 2.95 and the average family size was 3.22.

In the CDP the population was spread out, with 26.2% under the age of 18, 9.2% from 18 to 24, 29.7% from 25 to 44, 26.7% from 45 to 64, and 8.2% who were 65 years of age or older. The median age was 36 years. For every 100 females, there were 100.9 males. For every 100 females age 18 and over, there were 97.2 males.

The median income for a household in the CDP was $53,698, and the median income for a family was $55,313. Males had a median income of $36,385 versus $27,574 for females. The per capita income for the CDP was $20,615. About 4.0% of families and 7.1% of the population were below the poverty line, including 7.4% of those under age 18 and 8.1% of those age 65 or over.
