= Mosaic (vocal band) =

American cappella vocal group

- Origin: United States
- Genres: Pop; R&B; A cappella
- Years active: 2002–present
- Members: Kenny Urban; Heath Burgett; Corwyn Hodge; Josh Huslig; Jordan Michael
- Past members: Roopak Ahuja; Jake Moulton
- Website: www.mo5aic.com

Mosaic (stylized as MO5AIC) is a five-man vocal band from the United States. An innovative vocal collaboration, Mosaic combines elements of funk, pop, rock, jazz, R&B, and even opera to create a musical experience produced entirely by the human voice.

== Members ==
=== Current members ===
- Joshua Huslig - founder - bass, baritone
- Heath Burgett - tenor
- Corwyn Hodge - tenor
- Jordan Michael - baritone, tenor
- Kenny Urban - vocal percussion, bass

=== Former members ===
- Roopak Ahuja - baritone, tenor
- Jake Moulton - vocal percussion

== Biography ==
In 2002, bass vocalist, Josh Huslig, founded Mosaic, which consists of Joshua Huslig, Heath Burgett, Corwyn Hodge, Jake Moulton and Roopak Ahuja. Some of the members performed in various shows at Walt Disney World and Universal Studios in Orlando, FL. Mosaic quickly became a cruise ship headlining act and corporate entertainment favorite.

The now Las Vegas-based Mosaic moved rapidly from cruise ships and corporate conventions to venues such as opening act for comedian George Wallace at the Flamingo Las Vegas Hotel and Casino and headlining at the Silverton Casino. Mosaic came to Wallace's attention in early 2006 when one of his associates, Jack McKimmey, from the Flamingo happened to catch Mosaic performing on a Royal Caribbean cruise ship during his vacation. McKimmey purchased Mosaic's self-produced EP and brought it back with him to Las Vegas to show Wallace. Wallace then invited Mosaic to open for him during his nightly show at the Flamingo for three weeks, but on the second night of their performance, he hired the group for the rest of the year.

Since that time, Mosaic has opened for such superstars as Prince, Stevie Wonder, and Jay Leno. Mosaic also performed alongside Joey Fatone for TV Guide Network’s 51st Grammy Awards red carpet event, which required the band to learn 30 of the year’s nominated songs. Soon after their Grammy red carpet performance, TV Guide Network hired Mosaic to write a custom theme song for its pre-Academy Award promotions. The song, written and performed by Mosaic, received national play throughout the 2009 Oscar season. Currently, Mosaic is a featured act at the V Theater inside Planet Hollywood Resort and Casino on the Las Vegas Strip.

Mosaic is also known throughout the Las Vegas area as staunch supporters of music and arts education in schools. The band frequently donates their time by hosting fundraisers for the Public Education Foundation and has “adopted” West Preparatory Academy in Las Vegas, providing financial support to the school and scholarships to students with outstanding academic achievement. In addition, the group has been featured for many years at "Ribbon of Life", a fundraiser for the HIV/AIDS assistance organization, Golden Rainbow.

== Awards and recognition ==
In December 2007, after conducting a nationwide search for musical talent, CBS News' The Early Show and Motown giants Boyz II Men named Mosaic “The Next Great A Cappella Group” in the CBS "A Cappella Quest." In October 2008, Mosaic, with their unique instrument-free sound, was crowned the winner of MTV’s Top Pop Group, beating out eight other singing groups, all of which used accompaniment tracks. In addition, in April 2009, Mosaic received two CARA Awards (Contemporary A Cappella Recording Awards) for their self-produced debut album, Will Sing 4 Food, including “Best Pop/Rock Album” and “Best Pop/Rock Song” for their cover of “Home” by Marc Broussard, featuring Marc Broussard on lead vocals.

In 2011, Mosaic released "5" which was nominated for two CARA Awards, for "Best Pop/Rock Album" and "Best Pop/Rock Song."

== America's Got Talent ==
On July 22, 2009, Mosaic appeared as a contestant in the preliminary rounds of "America's Got Talent" Season 4, receiving a standing ovation from the Los Angeles audience for their rendition of “Shining Star” by Earth, Wind & Fire. On the July 29, 2009 episode, “Vegas Verdicts Part 1,” Mosaic secured a spot as one of the show's top 40 contestants. They were eliminated in the first week of the quarterfinals.

=== Performances/Results ===
Week	Song choice	Original artist	Performance order	Result
Audition	"Shining Star"	Earth, Wind, and Fire	N/A	Advanced
Vegas Verdicts	N/A	N/A	N/A	Advanced
Top 40; Group 1	"Superstition"/"I Wish"	Stevie Wonder	7	Eliminated

== Discography ==
Will Sing 4 Food (2008) (no longer available)

- Thank You
- Shining Star
- Creature
- Vecchia Zimarra
- Vecchia Zimarra (Remix)
- Summertime
- Lean On Me
- Seven
- You Saw My Face
- You Can't Get Far
- Manhattan Groove
- Home

Mosaic Live! (2010) (no longer available)

- Wanna Be Startin' Somethin'
- The Name Game
- More Bounce to the Ounce
- Anytime
- The Lion Sleeps Tonight
- Vecchia Zimarra
- Take 5
- Lean On Me
- Mack the Knife
- I Gotta Feelin'

5 (2011)

- I Gotta Feelin'
- Superstition
- Closer
- Firework
- Wanna Be Startin' Somethin'

RE5ET (2013)

- Speed of Sound
- Simple
- Superstar
- The One
- Just Turn Around

MO5AIC Live in Concert DVD (2013)

- Wanna Be Startin' Somethin'
- Superstition
- Just the Way You Are
- Lion Sleeps Tonight
- Vecchia Zimarra
- Take 5
- Jake Solo
- Bohemian Rhapsody
- Encore Medley
