= MTV's Top Pop Group =

- Created by: Allison Wallach
- Presented by: Mario Lopez
- Judges: Michelle Williams; Brian Friedman; Taboo
- Country of origin: United States
- No. of seasons: 1
- No. of episodes: 4

Production
- Production locations: Various locations (Auditions); Los Angeles, CA (Hollywood)
- Running time: 60/90 Minutes

Original release
- Network: MTV
- Release: September 11 – October 2, 2008

Related
- America's Best Dance Crew

MTV's Top Pop Group is a competitive reality television show consisting of nine pop groups looking to be the next Top pop group. The show aired on MTV and was hosted by Mario Lopez. The judges were Brian Friedman (former choreographer and judge from So You Think You Can Dance), Michelle Williams (from Destiny's Child) and Taboo (from The Black Eyed Peas). Marianela Pereyra was the show's backstage correspondent. The casting special aired on August 28, 2008 the show premiered on September 11, 2008. Only 4 weeks after the premiere, the series finale was aired suddenly on October 2, 2008.

== Groups ==
- Jazmin
- NJ5ive
- Concrete Rose
- Las Caprice
- Ju-Taun
- 3 Daze
- Mosaic
- LS3
- S1

== Rankings ==
Winner	Runner-Up	Safe	Bottom 3	Bottom 2	Eliminated

Episode Progress	Week:	9/11	9/18	9/25	10/2	10/9	10/16
1	Mosaic	Safe	Safe	Safe	Btm4	Safe	Winner
2	Ju-Tuan	Safe	Safe	Safe	Safe	Safe	2nd Place
3	Jazmin	Btm 2	Safe	Safe	Safe	Safe	3rd Place
4	S1	Btm 3	Safe	Btm 2	Elim		
5	Las Caprice	Safe	Safe	Safe	Elim		
6	NJ5ive	Safe	Btm 2	Safe	Elim		
7	Concrete Rose	Safe	Safe	Elim			
8	3 Daze	Safe	Elim				
9	LS3	Elim					

== Performances ==
Week 1:

- NJ5ive - Forever by Chris Brown
- 3 Daze - Mercy by Duffy
- LS3 - What You Got by Colby O'Donis
- Jazmin - Disturbia by Rihanna
- Mosaic - Got Me Going by Day26
- Concrete Rose - I Kissed a Girl by Katy Perry
- S1 - Stronger by Kanye West
- Las Caprice - Damaged by Danity Kane
- Ju-Tuan - Beautiful Girls by Sean Kingston

Week 2:

- Ju-Tuan - Closer by Ne-Yo
- Jazmin - Pocketful of Sunshine by Natasha Bedingfield
- S1 - Got Money by Lil' Wayne Feat T-Pain
- Las Caprice - Break the Ice by Britney Spears
- Mosaic - Makes Me Wonder by Maroon 5
- Concrete Rose - American Boy by Estelle and Kanye West
- 3 Daze - Tattoo by Jordin Sparks
- NJ5ive - Sexy Can I by Ray J

Week 3:

- Mosaic - Let's Get It Started by The Black Eyed Peas
- Las Caprice - SOS by Rihanna
- Ju-Tuan - Let Me Love You by Mario
- Jazmin - Bleeding Love by Leona Lewis
- NJ5ive - Confessions by Usher
- S1 - Put On by Young Jeezy
- Concrete Rose - Big Girls Don't Cry by Fergie

Week 4:

- Las Caprice - No One by Alicia Keys
- Mosaic - Kiss Kiss by Chris Brown
- Ju-Tuan - Leavin' by Jesse McCartney
- Jazmin - Say It Right by Nelly Furtado
- NJ5ive - With You by Chris Brown
- S1 - Smack That by Akon
