= Hall Street School =

- U.S. National Register of Historic Places
- New Jersey Register of Historic Places
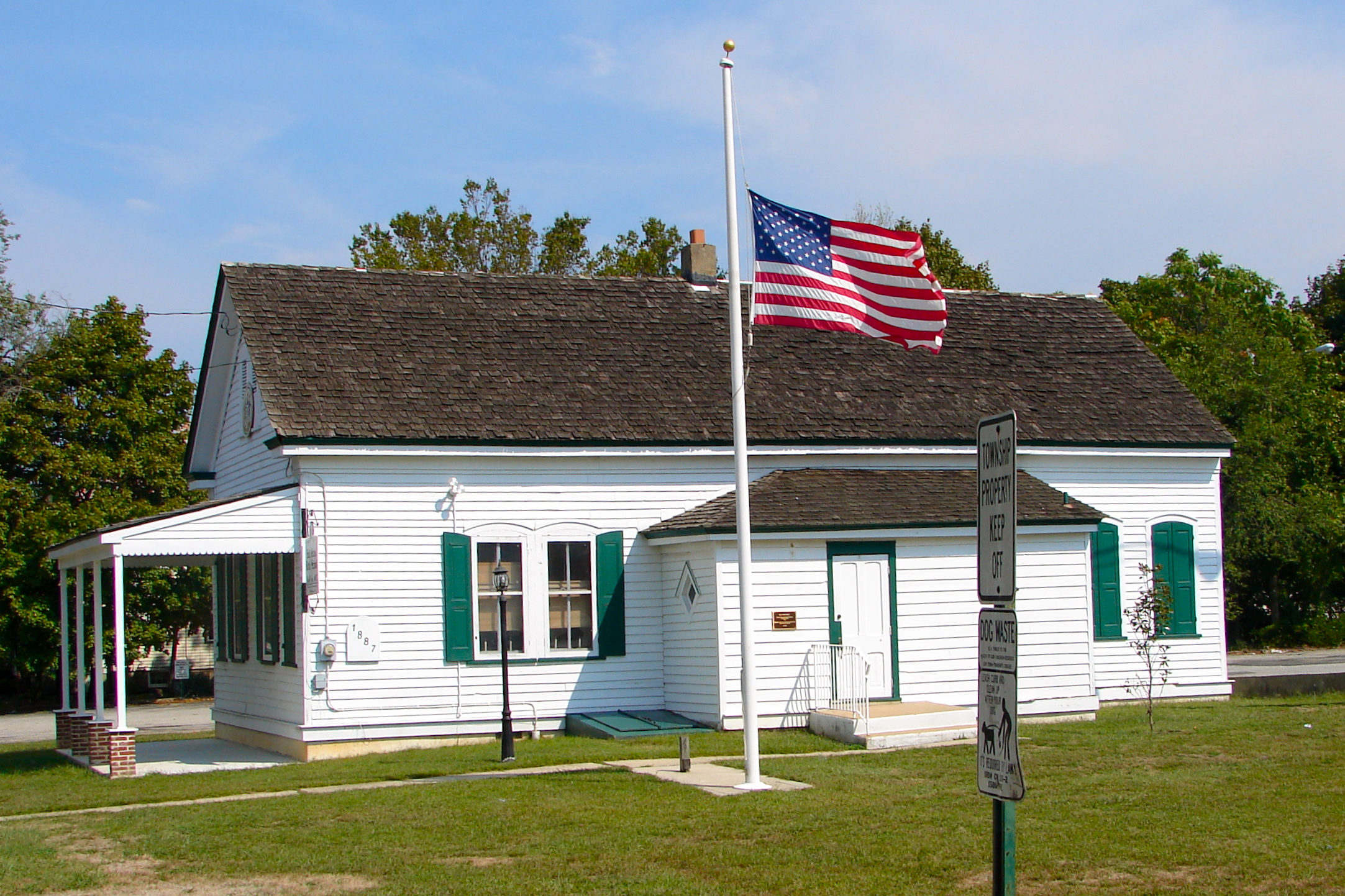

- Location within Gloucester County, New Jersey Location within New Jersey Location within the United States
- Location: 30 Hall Street, Monroe Township, Gloucester County, New Jersey
- Coordinates: 39°41′04″N 74°59′30″W
- Area: less than one acre
- Built: 1887
- Architectural style: Late Victorian
- NRHP reference No.: 06000879
- NJRHP No.: 4644

Significant dates
- Added to NRHP: September 27, 2006
- Designated NJRHP: August 6, 2006

Hall Street School is located in Monroe Township, Gloucester County, New Jersey, United States. The school was built in 1878 and was added to the National Register of Historic Places on September 27, 2006. It was moved from its original location to South Main Street.

== See also ==
- National Register of Historic Places listings in Gloucester County, New Jersey
