= Downer Methodist Episcopal Church =

Historic church in New Jersey, United States

- U.S. National Register of Historic Places
- New Jersey Register of Historic Places
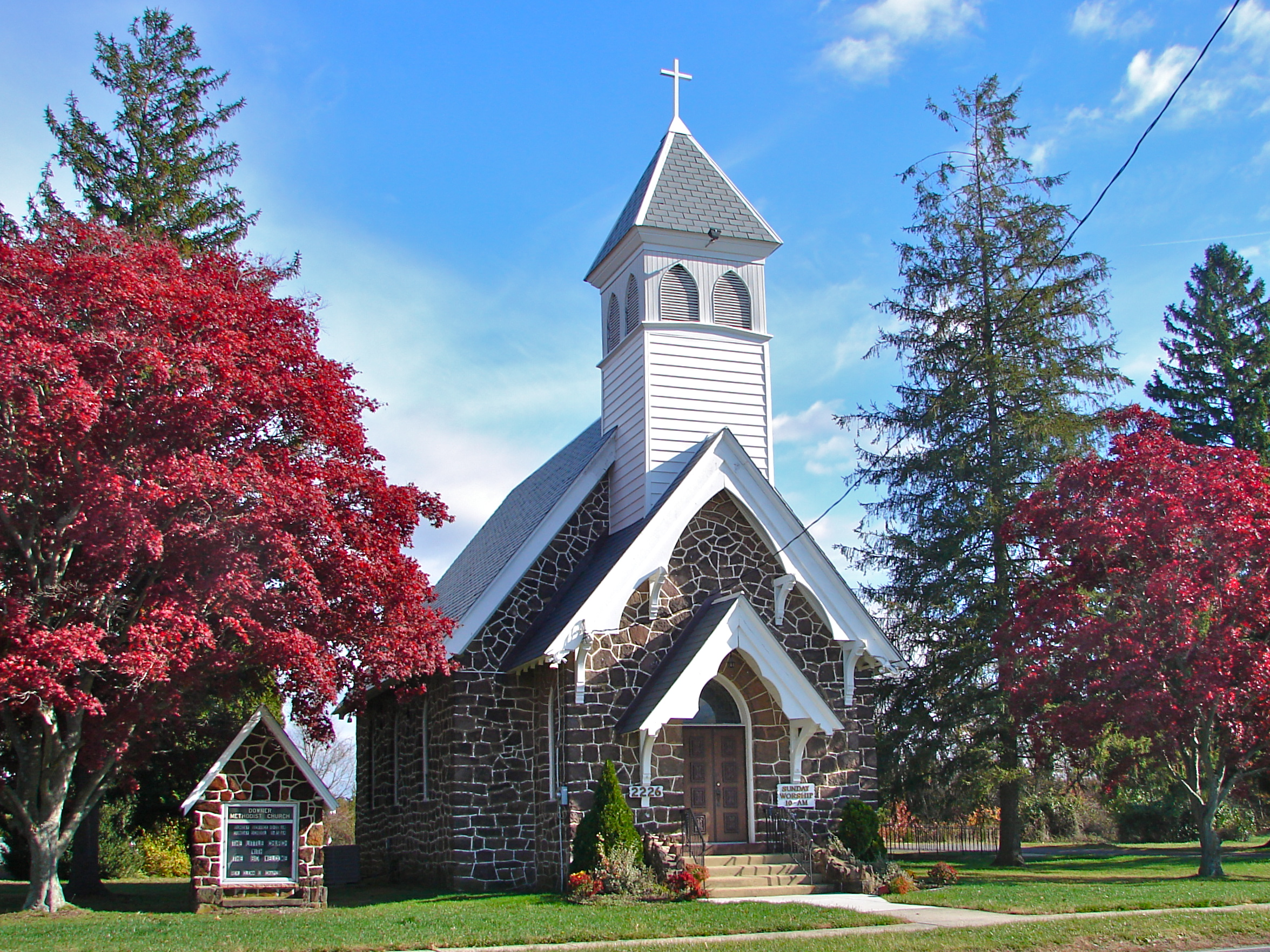
- Downer Methodist Episcopal Church in Monroe Township, New Jersey, November 2010

- Location within Gloucester County, New Jersey Location within New Jersey Location within the United States
- Location: 2226 Fries Mill Road, Monroe Township, Gloucester County, New Jersey, U.S.
- Coordinates: 39°41′37″N 75°3′8″W
- NRHP reference No.: 10000835
- NJRHP No.: 4561

Significant dates
- Added to NRHP: October 14, 2010
- Designated NJRHP: February 2, 2010

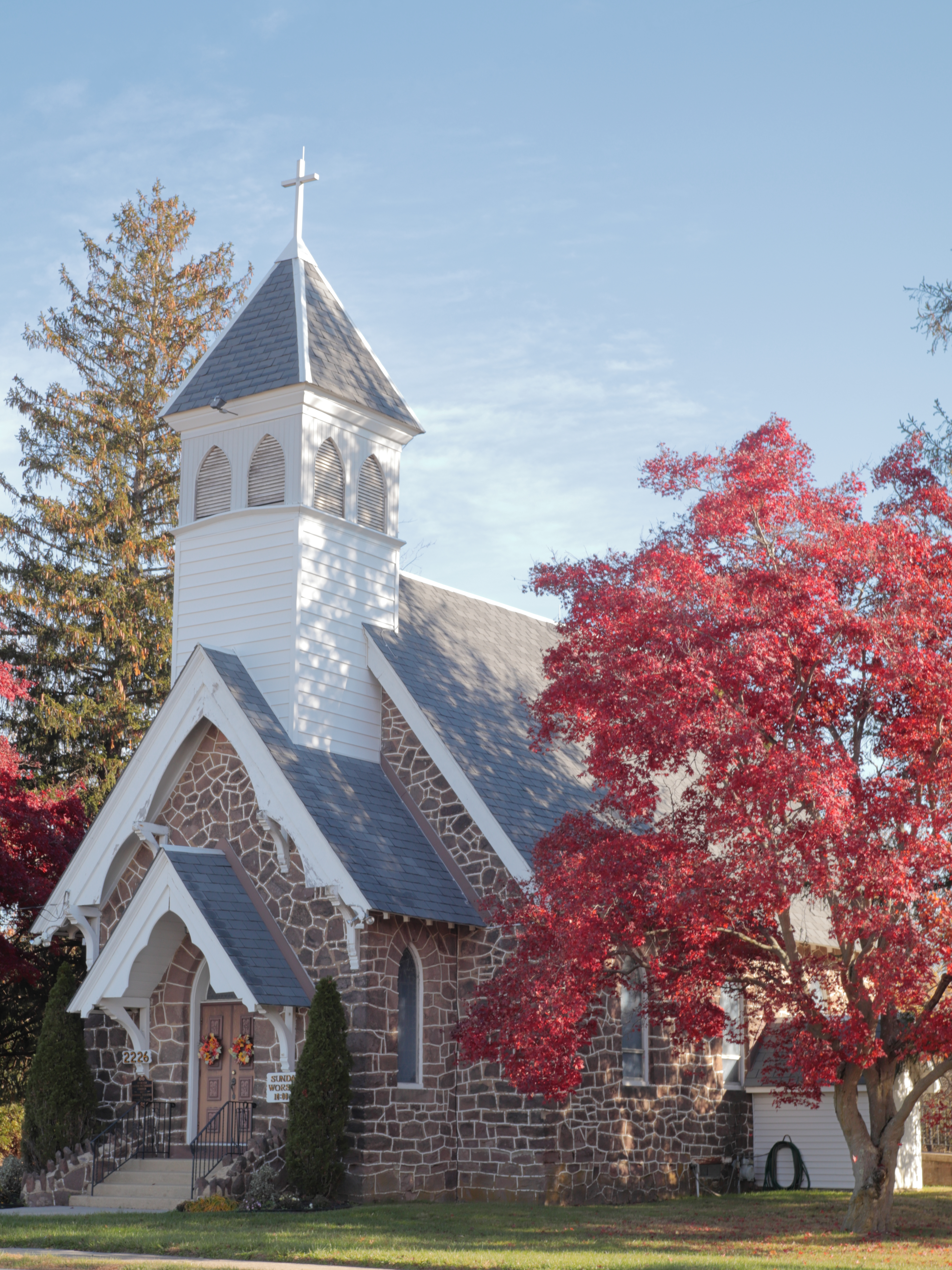
Downer Methodist Episcopal Church in 2021

Downer Methodist Episcopal Church is located in Monroe Township in Gloucester County, New Jersey. The church was added to the National Register of Historic Places on October 14, 2010.

== See also ==
- National Register of Historic Places listings in Gloucester County, New Jersey
