= David A. Schauer =

American radiobiologist (born 1961)

- Born: September 22, 1961 (age 65); Elmer, New Jersey
- Education: Liberty University, Georgetown University, Johns Hopkins University
- Occupations: Executive Director Emeritus, NCRP, Adjunct Associate Professor, Georgetown University; UNLV
- Website: www.ncrponline.org

David A. Schauer (born September 2, 1961) is an American radiation physicist who is the head of the Radiation Generators Division and the Defense Threat Reduction Agency (DTRA) liaison at the Armed Forces Radiobiology Research Institute (AFRRI). He is also the executive director emeritus of the National Council on Radiation Protection and Measurements (NCRP). During his tenure a number of updated and new publications were issued by the Council.

Prior to being elected NCRP secretary and treasurer, and appointed Executive Director (2004 to 2012), Dr. Schauer served in various scientific and leadership positions as an officer in the U.S. Navy (1984 to 2004). His primary research interests include thermoluminescent dosimetry and electron paramagnetic resonance biodosimetry. He is a member of numerous organizations including the American Society of Association Executives, the American College of Radiology, and the Health Physics Society.

== Early life and education ==
Born in Elmer, New Jersey, and raised in the Williamstown section of Monroe Township, Gloucester County, New Jersey, Schauer graduated from Williamstown High School in 1979, where he was named scholar athlete. He was recruited to pitch and earned his B.S. degree at Liberty University in 1983. Schauer received his M.S. from Georgetown university in 1989 and his doctor of science (Sc. D.) degree from Johns Hopkins University. He is a diplomate of the American Board of Health Physics.

Following graduation from Liberty, Schauer was commissioned as an ensign in the US Navy Medical Service Corps.

== Career ==
Following graduation from high school, Schauer was recruited to pitch for the Liberty Flames baseball team. Schauer was used mostly as a starter and set the single-game record for strikeouts that was later broken by Randy Tomlin, who played professionally for the Pittsburgh Pirates. During his years at Liberty, Schauer was coached by former major league pitcher, Al Worthington, and played with Sid Bream and Lee Guetterman. The Liberty Flames baseball teams of the early 1980s made three successive trips to the NAIA college world series in Lubbock, TX.

Following graduation from Liberty in 1983, Schauer was commissioned as an ensign in the US Navy Medical Service Corps. Ensign Schauer attended Navy Officer Indoctrination School in Newport, RI in 1984. That same year, he completed the Navy Radiation Health Officers Course at the Naval Undersea Medicine Institute in Groton, CT, and Combat Casualty Care (C4) at Ft. Sam Houston in San Antonio, TX, and was commissioned as a radiation specialist. Ensign Schauer worked his way up the ranks before retiring at the beginning of 2004 as a Commander. During those 20 years, Schauer served in various leadership positions in San Diego, CA, Portsmouth, NH and Bethesda, MD.

== Editorials and publications ==
Schauer has published a number of scientific articles, proceedings and reports individually and in collaboration with fellow scientists and students. He also contributed book chapters to the Handbook of Radioactivity Analysis published by Elsevier Academic Press (2003) and "Advances in Medical Physics: 2012" published by Medical Physics Publishing (2012).

Schauer is an editorial board member of the following journals:

- Radiation Measurements
- Radiation Protection Dosimetry
- Egyptian Journal of Biophysics
- Indian Journal of Radiation Research

He also serves as a referee for the following journals:

- Health Physics
- Radiation Physics and Chemistry
- Radiation Research
