= Raymond Arvidson =

Professor of Earth and Planetary Sciences

Raymond E. Arvidson
- Born: Brooklyn, New York, US
- Education: Temple University; Brown University
- Awards: Whipple Award (2007)
- Scientific career
- Fields: Planetary science
- Workplaces: Washington University in St. Louis
- Thesis: (1975)
- Doctoral advisor: Thomas A. Mutch
- Notable students: Bethany Ehlmann; Sarah Stewart Johnson

Raymond E. Arvidson is the James S. McDonnell Distinguished University Professor Emeritus in the Department of Earth, Environmental, and Planetary Sciences at Washington University in St. Louis. He is best known for his contributions to NASA missions to Mars, including as deputy director of the Mars Exploration Rovers.

== Education and career ==
Born in Brooklyn, New York, Arvidson moved with his family at the age of five to the Williamstown section of Monroe Township, Gloucester County, New Jersey, after his father's death and his mother's remarriage. Arvidson attended Williamstown High School, graduating in 1965. He earned a bachelor's degree in geology from Temple University in 1969, as well as his M.S. in 1971 and Ph.D. in 1975 from Brown University under the supervision of Thomas Mutch. He was the first person in his family to graduate from high school.

Arvidson became an assistant professor at Washington University in St. Louis in 1974 and received promotions to full professor in 1984 and to McDonnell Distinguished Professor in 1998. He has served as chair of the Earth and Planetary Sciences Department in Arts and Sciences at Washington University in St. Louis. Arvidson "has been instrumental in developing and implementing both orbital and landed missions to the planets." He has received four NASA Public Service Medals and the Whipple Award of the American Geophysical Union. He is a fellow of the Geological Society of America and the American Geophysical Union. Professor Arvidson works with NASA for Mars missions and studied Mars, Earth, and Venus. He also used his labatory Earth and Planetary Remote Sensing (EPRSL) to helps with space missions, research and organized scientific data.

Minor planet 397278 is named after Arvidson.

== Teaching and mentoring ==
Arvidson has received a number of teaching and advising awards, including Advisor of the Year, Student Union Professor of the Year, and the Outstanding Graduate Faculty Member Award from Washington University, as well as the Missouri Governor's Award for Excellence in Teaching. He directed the Pathfinder Program in Environmental Sustainability at Washington University, which had many notable alumni.
