= Monroe Township Public Schools =

School district in Gloucester County, New Jersey, US

Address
- 75 East Academy Street Williamstown, Gloucester County, New Jersey, 08094; United States
- Coordinates: 39.666114°N 74.977577°W

District information
- Grades: PreK-12
- Superintendent: Susan Ficke
- Business administrator: Lisa Schulz
- Schools: 6

Students and staff
- Enrollment: 5,736 (as of 2019–20)
- Faculty: 449.2 FTEs
- Student–teacher ratio: 12.8:1

Other information
- District Factor Group: CD
- Website: www.monroetwp.k12.nj.us
| Ind. | Per pupil | District spending | Rank (*) | K-12 average | %± vs. average |
|---|---|---|---|---|---|
| 1A | Total Spending | $15,644 | 10 | $18,891 | −17.2% |
| 1 | Budgetary Cost | 11,853 | 7 | 14,783 | −19.8% |
| 2 | Classroom Instruction | 6,792 | 2 | 8,763 | −22.5% |
| 6 | Support Services | 1,984 | 31 | 2,392 | −17.1% |
| 8 | Administrative Cost | 1,311 | 27 | 1,485 | −11.7% |
| 10 | Operations & Maintenance | 1,521 | 40 | 1,783 | −14.7% |
| 13 | Extracurricular Activities | 228 | 45 | 268 | −14.9% |
| 16 | Median Teacher Salary | 56,150 | 9 | 64,043 |
Data from NJDoE 2014 Taxpayers' Guide to Education Spending. *Of K-12 districts with more than 3,500 students. Lowest spending=1; Highest=103

The Monroe Township Public Schools is a comprehensive public school district serving the educational needs of students in pre-kindergarten through twelfth grade from Monroe Township, in Gloucester County, in the U.S. state of New Jersey. Services are also provided for preschool handicapped students as well as other students with special needs.

As of the 2019–20 school year, the district, comprising six schools, had an enrollment of 5,736 students and 449.2 classroom teachers (on an FTE basis), for a student–teacher ratio of 12.8:1.

The district is classified by the New Jersey Department of Education as being in District Factor Group "CD", the sixth-highest of eight groupings. District Factor Groups organize districts statewide to allow comparison by common socioeconomic characteristics of the local districts. From lowest socioeconomic status to highest, the categories are A, B, CD, DE, FG, GH, I and J.

== History ==
In October 2017, Holly Glen Elementary School was closed for extensive decontamination for a minimum of three weeks, after high levels of mold—including aspergillus / penicillium and cladosporium—were discovered in the building. Days later, the district announced that all of its schools would be closed for a minimum of a week to allow for testing in all of the district's facilities of what was described as a "possible mold infestation." Whitehall Elementary School was closed slightly after Holly Glen Elementary School. The former was remediated and students resumed classes on January 2, 2018.

== Awards and recognition ==
Radix Elementary School was honored by the National Blue Ribbon Schools Program in 2019, one of nine schools in the state recognized as Exemplary High Performing Schools.

== Schools ==
Schools in the district (with 2019–20 enrollment data from the National Center for Education Statistics) are:

Elementary schools

- Holly Glen Elementary School with 437 students in grades K-4
  - Karen Pontano-Crossley, principal
- Oak Knoll Elementary School with 529 students in grades K-4
  - Kristy Baker, principal
- Radix Elementary School with 640 students in grades PreK-4
  - Jill DelConte, principal
- Whitehall Elementary School with 311 students in grades K-4
  - JoAnne E. Rumpf, principal

Middle school

- Williamstown Middle School with 1,867 students in grades 5-8
  - Karim Fisher, principal

High school

- Williamstown High School with 1,837 students in grades 9-12
  - Christine A. Stanton, principal

== Administration ==
Core members of the district's administration are:

- Susan Ficke, superintendent
- Lisa Schulz, business administrator and board secretary

== Board of education ==
The district's board of education, composed of nine members, sets policy and oversees the fiscal and educational operation of the district through its administration. As a Type II school district, the board's trustees are elected directly by voters to serve three-year terms of office on a staggered basis, with three seats up for election each year held (since 2013) as part of the November general election. The board appoints a superintendent to oversee the district's day-to-day operations and a business administrator to supervise the business functions of the district.
