= Danny Collins (Canadian football) =

American football player (born 1993)

Albright Lions
- Title: Offensive coordinator & quarterbacks coach

Personal information
- Born: October 20, 1993 (age 33)
- Listed height: 6 ft 1 in (1.85 m)
- Listed weight: 218 lb (99 kg)

Career information
- Position: Quarterback (No. 17)
- High school: Williamstown (Williamstown, New Jersey)
- College: Maine (2012–2016)
- NFL draft: 2017: undrafted

Career history

Playing
- Frankfurt Universe (2017); Ottawa Redblacks (2017–2018)

Coaching
- Cedar Creek HS (NJ) (2023) Offensive coordinator & quarterbacks coach; Albright (2024) Quarterbacks coach; Albright (2025–present) Offensive coordinator & quarterbacks coach

Awards and highlights
- Third-team All-CAA (2016)
- Stats at CFL.ca

Daniel B. Collins (born October 20, 1993) is an American college football coach and former quarterback. He is the offensive coordinator and quarterbacks coach for Albright College, positions he has held since 2025. Collins played professionally for the Frankfurt Universe of the German Football League (GFL) and the Ottawa Redblacks of the Canadian Football League (CFL). He played college football for the Maine Black Bears.

== Early life ==
Daniel B. Collins was born on October 20, 1993. He played high school football, basketball, and volleyball at Williamstown High School in Williamstown, New Jersey. He earned first-team All-West Jersey Football League honors as a senior in 2011.

== College career ==
Collins played college football for the Maine Black Bears of the University of Maine. He was redshirted in 2011. He played in two games in 2012 as the backup to Marcus Wasilewski, completing four of six passes for 35 yards. Collins was named the starting quarterback a day before the 2014 season opener. He started the first six games, completing 77 of 143 passes for 908 yards and nine touchdowns, before suffering a season-ending injury. Collins split time with Drew Belcher in 2015. Collins played in nine games, starting seven, overall during the 2015 season, recording 135 completions on 273 passing attempts for 1,542 yards, six touchdowns, ten interceptions, 59 rushing yards, and two rushing touchdowns. He beat out Belcher for the starting job in 2016. Collins played in all 11 games for the Black Bears during the 2016 season, completing 166 of 318 passes for 2,375 yards, 18 touchdowns, and 16 interceptions. He was named third-team All-CAA for his senior year performance. He majored in kinesiology and physical education at Maine.

== Professional career ==
After going undrafted in the 2017 NFL draft, Collins attended rookie minicamp on a tryout basis with the Buffalo Bills. After Frankfurt Universe starting quarterback Mike Wegzyn suffered an injury, the German Football League team signed Collins in May 2017. Collins spent two weeks with the Universe before signing with the Ottawa Redblacks of the Canadian Football League (CFL) in June. He was moved to the practice roster on June 18 before the start of the 2017 CFL season. He was promoted to the active roster on September 16 and dressed in three games for the Redblacks without recording any statistics. Collins was placed on the injured list on October 6, 2017, and spent the remainder of the season there. He dressed in all 18 games for Ottawa in 2018, completing eight of 17 passes (47.1%) for 90 yards and one interception. Collins was released by Ottawa on June 8, 2019.

== Coaching career ==
Collins was the offensive coordinator and quarterbacks coach at Cedar Creek High School in 2023. He served as the quarterbacks coach at Albright College in 2024, and was promoted to offensive coordinator after the season.
