= Dan Hutchison =

American politician

Member of the New Jersey General Assembly from the 4th district
- Incumbent
- Assumed office January 9, 2024 Serving with Cody Miller
- Preceded by: Paul D. Moriarty; Gabriela Mosquera

Personal details
- Born: Daniel Hutchison
- Party: Democratic (2005–present)
- Other political affiliations: Republican (before 2005)
- Education: Rider University; Widener University Delaware Law School

Daniel Hutchison is an American attorney and Democratic Party politician serving as a member of the New Jersey General Assembly for the 4th legislative district, since taking office on January 9, 2024.

== Biography ==
A resident since 1995 of Gloucester Township, New Jersey, Hutchison graduated in 1989 from Rider College (since renamed as Rider University), earned certification as a Certified Public Accountant, and is an attorney who earned his degree at Widener University Delaware Law School in 1995.

He was the Republican nominee for the 1st Congressional District of New Jersey in the 2004 United States House of Representatives elections in New Jersey.

He has been elected to five terms as a member of the Gloucester Township Council.

== Elective office ==
Led by Paul D. Moriarty, who was running for the New Jersey Senate seat vacated by Fred Madden, Hutchison and his Democratic running mate Cody Miller, defeated Republicans Amanda Esposito and Matthew P. Walker in the 2023 New Jersey General Assembly election.

== District 4 ==
Each of the 40 districts in the New Jersey Legislature has one representative in the New Jersey Senate and two members in the New Jersey General Assembly. The representatives from the 4th District for the 2024—2025 Legislative Session are:

- Senator Paul D. Moriarty (D)
- Assemblyman Dan Hutchison (D)
- Assemblyman Cody Miller (D)

== Electoral history ==
New Jersey's 1st congressional district election, 2004
Party	Candidate	Votes	%
Democratic	Rob Andrews (incumbent)	201,163	75.00%
Republican	Daniel Hutchison	66,109	24.65%
Independent	Arturo Croce	931	0.35%
Majority		135,054	50.36%
Turnout		268,203	
Democratic hold			

4th Legislative District General Election, 2023
Party	Candidate	Votes	%
Democratic	Dan Hutchison	30,116	26.5
Democratic	Cody D. Miller	29,770	26.2
Republican	Amanda Esposito	26,653	23.5
Republican	Matthew P. Walker	25,881	22.8
Conservatives South Jersey	Maureen Dukes Penrose	1,145	1.0
Total votes		113,565	100.0
Democratic hold			
