= Donovan Ezeiruaku =

American football player (born 2003)

- Ezeiruaku in 2025

No. 6 – Dallas Cowboys
- Position: Outside linebacker
- Roster status: Active

Personal information
- Born: September 25, 2003 (age 23); Philadelphia, Pennsylvania, U.S.
- Listed height: 6 ft 2 in (1.88 m)
- Listed weight: 255 lb (116 kg)

Career information
- High school: Williamstown (NJ)
- College: Boston College (2021–2024)
- NFL draft: 2025: 2nd round, 44th overall pick

Career history
- Dallas Cowboys (2025–present)

Awards and highlights
- Ted Hendricks Award (2024); Consensus All-American (2024)

Career NFL statistics as of Week 5, 2026
- Tackles: 66
- Sacks: 2.5
- Forced fumbles: 2
- Stats at Pro Football Reference

Donovan Kanayochukwu Ezeiruaku (Ezz-ah-RAH-koo; born September 25, 2003) is an American professional football outside linebacker for the Dallas Cowboys of the National Football League (NFL). He played college football for the Boston College Eagles, winning the 2024 Ted Hendricks Award before being selected by the Cowboys in the second round of the 2025 NFL draft.

== Early life ==
Ezeiruaku was born on September 25, 2003, in Philadelphia and grew up in Williamstown, New Jersey. He attended Williamstown High School and as a senior in 2021, recorded 47 tackles, including nine tackles for loss, and two sacks while leading his team to a 7–2 record. Ezeiruaku committed to play college football at Boston College over schools such as Northern Illinois, Temple and Vanderbilt.

== College career ==
=== 2021 season ===
As a freshman in 2021, Ezeiruaku racked up 19 tackles, three tackles for loss, and two sacks.

=== 2022 season ===
In the 2022 season opener, Ezeiruaku recorded nine tackles with two being for a loss, a sack, and two forced fumbles in a loss to Rutgers. In week ten, he had seven tackles with two being for a loss, a sack, and a forced fumble in a loss to Duke. In the season finale, Ezeiruaku tallied nine tackles with three going for a loss, and 2.5 sacks, but Boston College lost to Syracuse 32–23. He finished the season with 61 tackles with 14.5 going for a loss, 8.5 sacks, two pass deflections, and three forced fumbles, earning second-team all-Atlantic Coast Conference (ACC) honors.

=== 2023 season ===
Ezeiruaku was named preseason first-team all-ACC ahead of the 2023 season. In week 5 against Virginia, he recorded 6 total tackles, and 2 sacks. The following week against Army Ezeiruaku had five total tackles, a forced fumble, and a fumble recovery. The Eagles finished with an upset win in the Fenway Bowl against the No. 24 SMU Mustangs.

=== 2024 season ===
To start the season, the Eagles upset the No. 10 Florida State Seminoles 28–13, in which Ezeiruaku recorded four total tackles and two sacks. In Week 5 against Western Kentucky, Ezeiruaku recorded 14 total tackles, three sacks, one forced fumble and a fumble recovery. The following week against Virginia, Ezeiruaku recorded 10 total tackles and a sack. In Week 13 against North Carolina, Ezeiruaku had two sacks and six total tackles. The following week against Pittsburgh, he recorded 3.5 sacks, putting him with 16.5 sacks on the season, tying the record held by Harold Landry for the most sacks in a season in Boston College football history. He was named 2024 ACC Defensive Player of the Year and was awarded the Ted Hendricks Award as the nation's top defensive end.

== Professional career ==
Pre-draft measurables
Height	Weight	Arm length	Hand span	Wingspan	20-yard shuttle	Three-cone drill	Vertical jump	Broad jump	Bench press
6 ft 2 1/2 in (1.89 m)	248 lb (112 kg)	34 in (0.86 m)	9 1/4 in (0.23 m)	6 ft 10 3/4 in (2.10 m)	4.19 s	6.94 s	35.5 in (0.90 m)	9 ft 11 in (3.02 m)	22 reps
All values from NFL Combine

Ezeiruaku was selected with the 44th pick in the 2025 NFL draft by the Dallas Cowboys. He recorded the first sack of his professional career on October 19, 2025, against Marcus Mariota of the Washington Commanders.

== Personal life ==
On January 11, 2026, Ezeiruaku was arrested in Plano, Texas for reckless driving.

He is of Nigerian descent.

== NFL career statistics ==
Legend
	Led the league
**Bold**	Career high

Regular season

Year	Team	Games		Tackles							Fumbles				Interceptions			
Year	Team	GP	GS	Cmb	Solo	Ast	Sck	TFL	QBHits	Sfty	FF	FR	Yds	TD	Int	Yds	TD	PD
2025	DAL	17	9	40	20	20	2.0	9	12	1	1	0	0	0	0	0	0	0
2026	DAL	5	5	26	12	14	0.5	1	2	0	1	0	0	0	0	0	0	0
Career		22	14	66	32	34	2.5	10	14	1	2	0	0	0	0	0	0	0
