= Cross Keys Airport =

- IATA: none; ICAO: none; FAA LID: 17N

Summary
- Airport type: Public use
- Owner: Cross Keys Airport Inc.
- Serves: Monroe Township, New Jersey, U.S.
- Location: Gloucester County, New Jersey, U.S.
- Elevation AMSL: 162 ft (49 m)
- Coordinates: 39°42′20″N 075°01′59″W

Map
- Interactive map of Cross Keys Airport

Runways
Direction	Length		Surface
Direction	ft	m	Surface
9/27	3,500	1,067	Asphalt

Statistics (2021)
- Aircraft operations (year ending November 18, 2021): 22,951
- Based aircraft: 30
- Source: Federal Aviation Administration

Cross Keys Airport (FAA LID: 17N) is a privately owned, public-use airport located one nautical mile (2 km) south of the Cross Keys area of Monroe Township in Gloucester County, New Jersey. A skydiving operation is based at the airport.

== History ==
On May 25, 2006, several F-16 jets escorted a Cessna aircraft to land at Cross Keys Airport after it strayed into a 30-mile restricted area temporarily imposed during the visit of U.S. President George W. Bush to a town in Pennsylvania. The pilot was said to be "in radio contact... compliant."

== Facilities and aircraft ==
Cross Keys Airport covers an area of 280 acres (113 ha) at an elevation of 162 feet (49 m) above mean sea level. It has one runway designated 9/27 with an asphalt surface measuring 3,500 by 50 feet (1,067 x 15 m).

For the 12-month period ending November 18, 2021, the airport had 22,951 general aviation aircraft operations, an average of 63 per day. At that time there were 30 aircraft based at this airport: 28 single-engine and 2 multi-engine.

== Accidents ==
There have been 13 non-fatal and two fatal accidents at Cross Keys Airport. The two fatal accidents have been:

- On March 13, 1986, a 38-year-old man was fatally injured when he attempted to land at night in low visibility and fog. He impacted two houses and was killed.
- On June 13, 1996, a student pilot, his flight instructor, and a passenger were killed while performing emergency engine-out maneuvers. Mama Juana was found in the student pilot's system. The plane did not have dual controls, making the student the only person able to control the plane, and the plane was not approved for student training because of its controls system.

Other Notable Accidents Include:

- On July 2, 2025, a Cessna 208B Caravan flying a skydiving mission reported engine troubles and crashed while trying to return to the airport. 15 people on board were injured.

== See also ==
- List of airports in New Jersey
