= Scotland Run Golf Club =

Private golf course and country club located in Williamstown, New Jersey

Coordinates: 39.69960°N 75.04977°W

Club information
- Location: Williamstown, New Jersey, U.S.
- Established: 1999
- Type: Private
- Tota holes: 18
- Website: http://www.scotlandrun.com/
- Designed by: Stephen Kay
- Par: 71
- Length: 6,810 yards
- Course rating: 71.9
- Slope rating: 131

Scotland Run Golf Club is a private golf course and country club situated in Williamstown, New Jersey, United States. The 18-hole course was established in 1999 and was built on an old sand quarry, offering a unique blend of wooded, quarry and links-style landscaping. The course features five holes that come into contact with the quarry landscape, with the 16th hole being particularly notable. Golfers must hit over the quarry and into the landing area, which is nearly 400 yards away from the black tee.

Scotland Run was named one of the Top 50 Public Courses in the country by the readers of Golf World in their annual Readers' Choice Awards in both 2009 and 2010. Additionally, the course was awarded the prestigious title of #1 course in the Philadelphia Region by Business Week Magazine.
