= Williamstown, New Jersey =

Populated place in Gloucester County, New Jersey, US

- Census-designated place
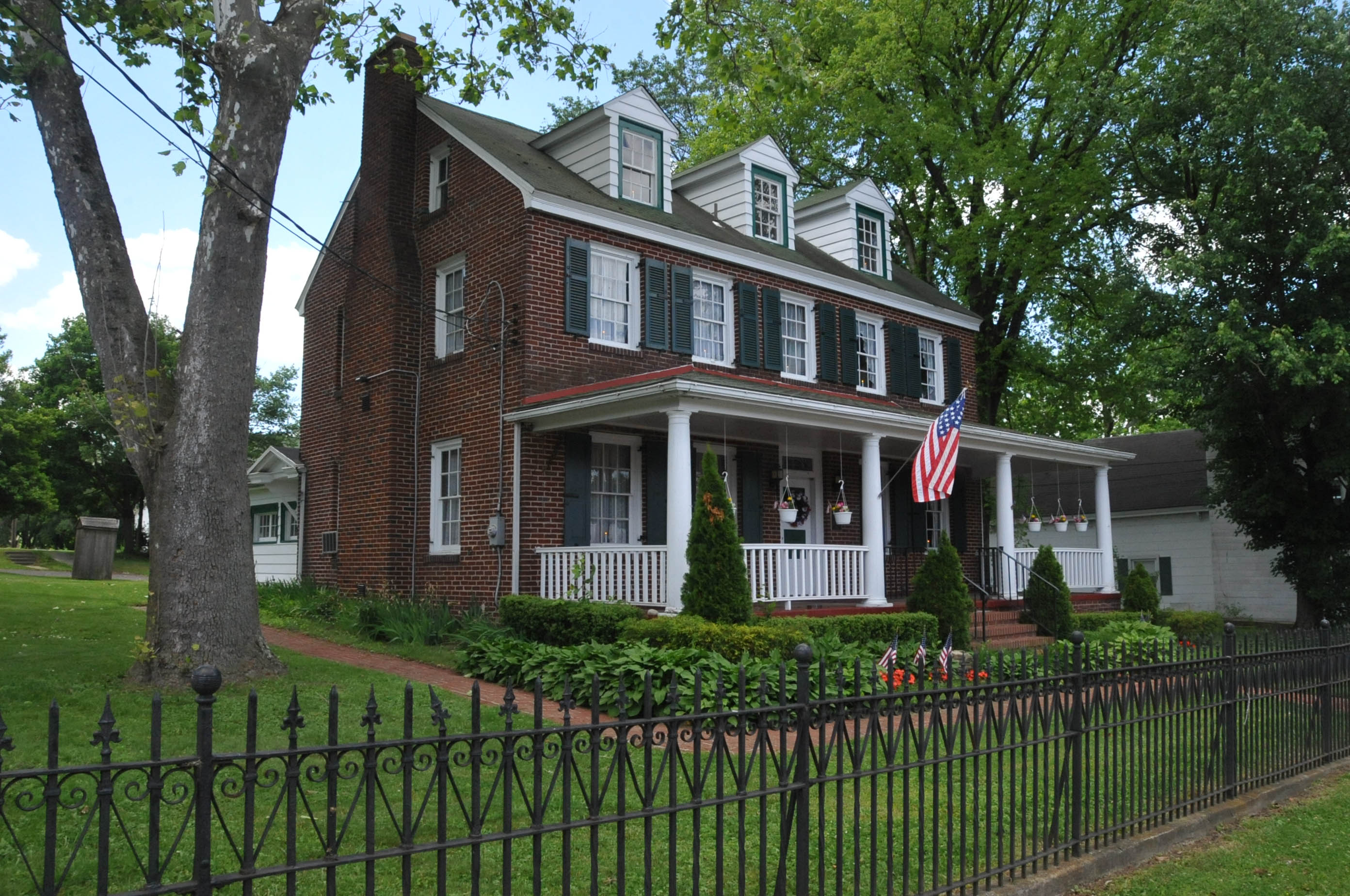
- Ireland Hofer House in Williamstown, New Jersey

- Map of Williamstown highlighted within Gloucester County. Right: Location of Gloucester County in New Jersey.

- Location in Gloucester County Location in New Jersey Location in the United States
- Coordinates: 39.684113°N 74.968819°W
- Country: United States
- State: New Jersey
- County: Gloucester
- Township: Monroe
- Established: 1737 as Squankum; 1842 as Williamstown

Area
  - Total: 7.42 sq mi (19.23 km^{2})
  - Land: 7.42 sq mi (19.22 km^{2})
  - Water: 0.0039 sq mi (0.01 km^{2}) 0.05%
- Elevation: 141 ft (43 m)

Population (2020)
  - Total: 15,082
  - Density: 2,032.3/sq mi (784.67/km^{2})
- Time zone: UTC−05:00 (Eastern (EST))
  - Summer (DST): UTC−04:00 (Eastern (EDT))
- ZIP Code: 08094
- Area code: 856
- FIPS code: 34-81380
- GNIS feature ID: 02390518

Williamstown is an unincorporated community and census-designated place (CDP) located in Monroe Township in Gloucester County, in the U.S. state of New Jersey. As of the 2020 census, Williamstown had a population of 15,082.

== History ==
Before the community's settlement in 1737, Williamstown was inhabited by the Lenni-Lenape tribe of Native Americans, from whom the town derived its original name, "Squankum", for "place where evil spirits dwell". The name was changed to Williamstown when the town's first post office was established in 1842, due to postal regulations that prohibited two towns from having the same name, as there was an older Squankum located 60 miles (97 km) northeast. It is generally thought that 'evil spirits' referred to the abundance of mosquitoes in the area, a by-product of the low-lying swamps that characterized the area during that time period. In the early eighteenth century, Richard Penn sold what eventually became Williamstown to his grandson, John Williams, who divided and resold the land in lots to settlers and for whom the town was eventually renamed. The town was officially incorporated as Monroe Township in March 1859, with Williamstown as meeting place to vote and have town discussions. A municipal court was established in the Township of Monroe, in accordance with the provisions of Chapter 264 of the Laws of 1948. The first school was built in 1750 and stood where the Washington Hotel now stands. The local schools operated on a pay-as-you-go basis until the 1850s and were predominantly church-run. The area built its first high school in 1958.

The population of the town remained small until the early 1830s when the glass industry sprung up (Glassboro, a neighboring town, still bears the name borne of that commercial boom). The first company to form was called Free Will Glass Manufacturing and caused a population surge. The industry thrived until the early 1900s when agricultural businesses began to flourish in the face of the waning glass industry. One notable company, The John Sharp Canning Co., still operates today as Blue Ribbon. The Monroe Township Historical Society was formed as a volunteer organization on October 16, 1974, by Mayor John W. Sharp (of the Canning Company Sharps), dedicated to the preservation of items that reflect the history of Monroe Township.

In 2014, the community had a death rate from heroin that was 25 times the national average, with about five people per year dying of overdoses and other complications in the previous decade.

== Geography ==
According to the U.S. Census Bureau, Williamstown had a total area of 7.423 square miles (19.23 km^{2}), including 7.419 square miles (19.22 km^{2}) of land and 0.004 square miles (0.010 km^{2}) of water (0.05%). It has a humid subtropical climate (Cfa) and average monthly temperatures range from 33.2° in January to 76.7 °F in July. The hardiness zone is 7a.

== Demographics ==
Historical population
Census	Pop.	Note	%±
1950	2,632		—
1960	2,722		3.4%
1970	4,075		49.7%
1980	5,768		41.5%
1990	10,891		88.8%
2000	11,812		8.5%
2010	15,567		31.8%
2020	15,082		−3.1%
Population sources: 1950 1960 1960-1980; 1970 1980 1990 2000; 2010 2020

Williamstown first appeared as an unincorporated community in the 1950 U.S. census; and then as a census designated place in the 1980 U.S. census.

=== 2020 census ===
As of the 2020 census, Williamstown had a population of 15,082. The median age was 42.1 years. 21.8% of residents were under the age of 18 and 19.2% of residents were 65 years of age or older. For every 100 females there were 92.2 males, and for every 100 females age 18 and over there were 88.3 males age 18 and over.

96.8% of residents lived in urban areas, while 3.2% lived in rural areas.

There were 5,625 households in Williamstown, of which 32.8% had children under the age of 18 living in them. Of all households, 49.4% were married-couple households, 15.1% were households with a male householder and no spouse or partner present, and 28.6% were households with a female householder and no spouse or partner present. About 25.2% of all households were made up of individuals and 12.9% had someone living alone who was 65 years of age or older.

There were 5,941 housing units, of which 5.3% were vacant. The homeowner vacancy rate was 1.8% and the rental vacancy rate was 5.1%.

Racial composition as of the 2020 census
Race	Number	Percent
White	11,132	73.8%
Black or African American	2,097	13.9%
American Indian and Alaska Native	40	0.3%
Asian	333	2.2%
Native Hawaiian and Other Pacific Islander	2	0.0%
Some other race	423	2.8%
Two or more races	1,055	7.0%
Hispanic or Latino (of any race)	1,172	7.8%

=== 2010 Census ===
The 2010 United States census counted 15,567 people, 5,592 households, and 4,037 families in the CDP. The population density was 2,098.2 people per square mile (810.1 people/km^{2}). There were 5,857 housing units at an average density of 789.4 units per square mile (304.8 units/km^{2}). The racial makeup was 80.43% (12,521) White, 13.08% (2,036) Black or African American, 0.19% (29) Native American, 2.04% (318) Asian, 0.01% (2) Pacific Islander, 1.79% (279) from other races, and 2.45% (382) from two or more races. Hispanic or Latino of any race were 5.27% (820) of the population.

Of the 5,592 households, 35.5% had children under the age of 18; 54.3% were married couples living together; 13.1% had a female householder with no husband present and 27.8% were non-families. Of all households, 23.1% were made up of individuals and 11.0% had someone living alone who was 65 years of age or older. The average household size was 2.76 and the average family size was 3.26.

26.2% of the population were under the age of 18, 7.8% from 18 to 24, 26.4% from 25 to 44, 25.0% from 45 to 64, and 14.6% who were 65 years of age or older. The median age was 38.3 years. For every 100 females, the population had 90.8 males. For every 100 females ages 18 and older there were 86.6 males.

=== 2000 Census ===
As of the 2000 U.S. census, there were 11,812 people, 4,484 households, and 3,223 families residing in the CDP. The population density was 740.4 people/km^{2} (1,918 people/mi^{2}). There were 4,764 housing units at an average density of 298.6 units/km^{2} (773 units/mi^{2}). The racial makeup of the CDP was 85.68% White, 10.35% African American, 0.30% Native American, 0.96% Asian, 0.06% Pacific Islander, 0.99% from other races, and 1.67% from two or more races. Hispanic or Latino of any race were 2.87% of the population.

There were 4,484 households, out of which 32.6% had children under the age of 18 living with them, 55.6% were married couples living together, 12.2% had a female householder with no husband present, and 28.1% were non-families. 23.8% of all households were made up of individuals, and 11.6% had someone living alone who was 65 years of age or older. The average household size was 2.63 and the average family size was 3.13.

In the CDP, the population was spread out, with 25.2% under the age of 18, 8.0% from 18 to 24, 29.0% from 25 to 44, 23.0% from 45 to 64, and 14.9% who were 65 years of age or older. The median age was 37 years. For every 100 females, there were 90.5 males. For every 100 females age 18 and over, there were 85.4 males.

The median income for a household in the CDP was $44,200, and the median income for a family was $51,552. Males had a median income of $40,411 versus $29,112 for females. The per capita income for the CDP was $19,112. About 5.5% of families and 7.5% of the population were below the poverty line, including 10.8% of those under age 18 and 4.7% of those age 65 or over.

== Transportation ==
Cross Keys Airport is a public-use general aviation airport located 2.5 miles (4.0 km) northwest of the central business district. U.S. Route 322 and New Jersey Route 42 pass through Central Williamstown.

== Education ==
Monroe Township Public Schools is a comprehensive public school district serving the educational needs of resident students from grades Kindergarten through twelve.

St. Mary School is a K-8 elementary school that operates under the auspices of the Roman Catholic Diocese of Camden.

== Recreation ==
Scotland Run Golf Club is a public golf course located in Williamstown, near U.S. Route 322.

Tall Pines Day Camp is a summer camp in Williamstown, for young children and teenagers. It was founded in 1996 and is accredited by the American Camping Association.

Hospitality Creek is a campground consisting of an RV park, Olympic-size swimming pool, 30-acre (12 ha) lake, and other outdoor amenities. It was established in 1961 and located within five minutes from the center of Williamstown.

Skydive Cross Keys, operating out of Cross Keys Airport, offers both tandem skydiving and skydive training.

== Notable people ==
People who were born in, residents of, or otherwise closely associated with Williamstown include:

- Raymond Arvidson, planetary scientist at Washington University in St. Louis, best known for his contributions to NASA missions to Mars, including as deputy director of the Mars Exploration Rovers
- Dave Calloway (born 1968), college basketball coach and the former head men's basketball coach at Monmouth University
- Danny Collins (born 1993), former professional football quarterback who played for the Ottawa Redblacks of the Canadian Football League
- Donovan Ezeiruaku (born 2003), American football defensive end for the Dallas Cowboys
- Brittany Ratcliffe (born 1994), soccer player who plays as a forward for the Washington Spirit in the NWSL
- David A. Schauer (born 1961, class of 1979) radiation physicist
