= Jim Auer =

American football player (born 1962)

No. 97
- Position: Defensive end

Personal information
- Born: January 4, 1962 (age 64); Philadelphia, Pennsylvania, U.S.
- Listed height: 6 ft 7 in (2.01 m)
- Listed weight: 275 lb (125 kg)

Career information
- High school: Washington Township
- College: Georgia
- NFL draft: 1985: undrafted

Career history
- Washington Redskins (1985)*; Philadelphia Eagles (1986–1987)
- * Offseason or practice squad member only
- Stats at Pro Football Reference

James Robert Auer (born January 4, 1962) is an American former professional football player who was a defensive end for the Philadelphia Eagles of the National Football League (NFL) in 1987. He played college football for the Georgia Bulldogs.

Auer played prep football at Washington Township High School in Washington Township, Gloucester County, New Jersey.
