= George Jr. and Sarah Morgan House =

Historic house in New Jersey, United States

- U.S. National Register of Historic Places
- New Jersey Register of Historic Places
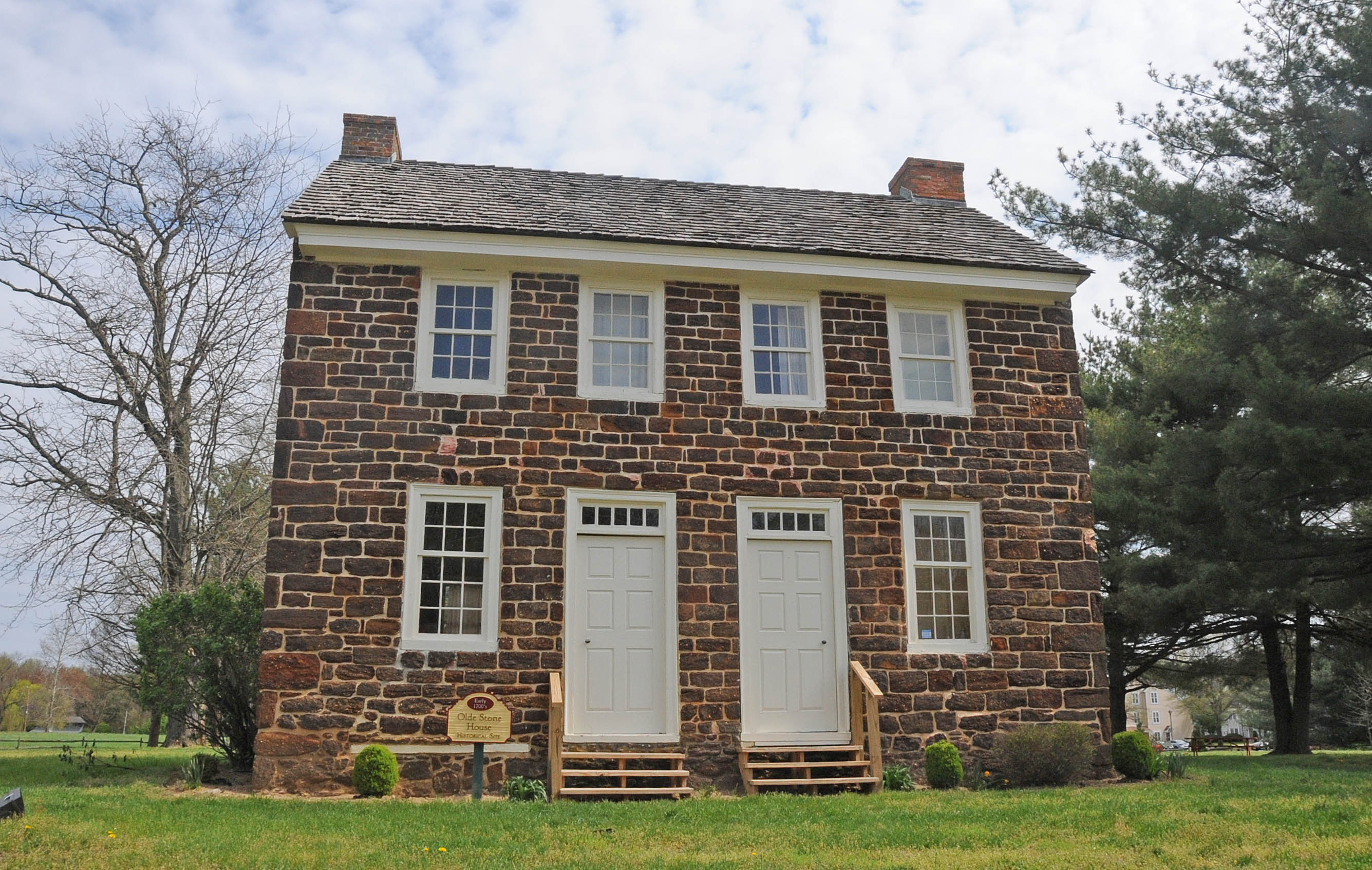
- Olde Stone House

- Location within Gloucester County, New Jersey Location within New Jersey Location within the United States
- Location: 208 Egg Harbor Road, Washington Township, Gloucester County, New Jersey, U.S.
- Coordinates: 39°46′38″N 75°5′39″W
- Built: c. 1765
- Architectural style: Georgian
- NRHP reference No.: 100003593
- NJRHP No.: 1418

Significant dates
- Added to NRHP: April 8, 2019
- Designated NJRHP: February 19, 2019

The George Jr. and Sarah Morgan House, also known as the Olde Stone House, is a historic Georgian style house located at 208 Egg Harbor Road in Washington Township in Gloucester County, New Jersey, United States. Built c. 1765, it was added to the National Register of Historic Places on April 8, 2019, for its significance in architecture.

== History and description ==
The two-story vernacular Georgian style house features a coursed ashlar façade using local ironstone. According to the nomination form, the house was earlier thought to have been built by George Morgan Sr. c. 1730. Recent research indicates that it was built by his son, George Morgan Jr., sometime between c. 1760 and 1775, noted as c. 1765 by the nomination.

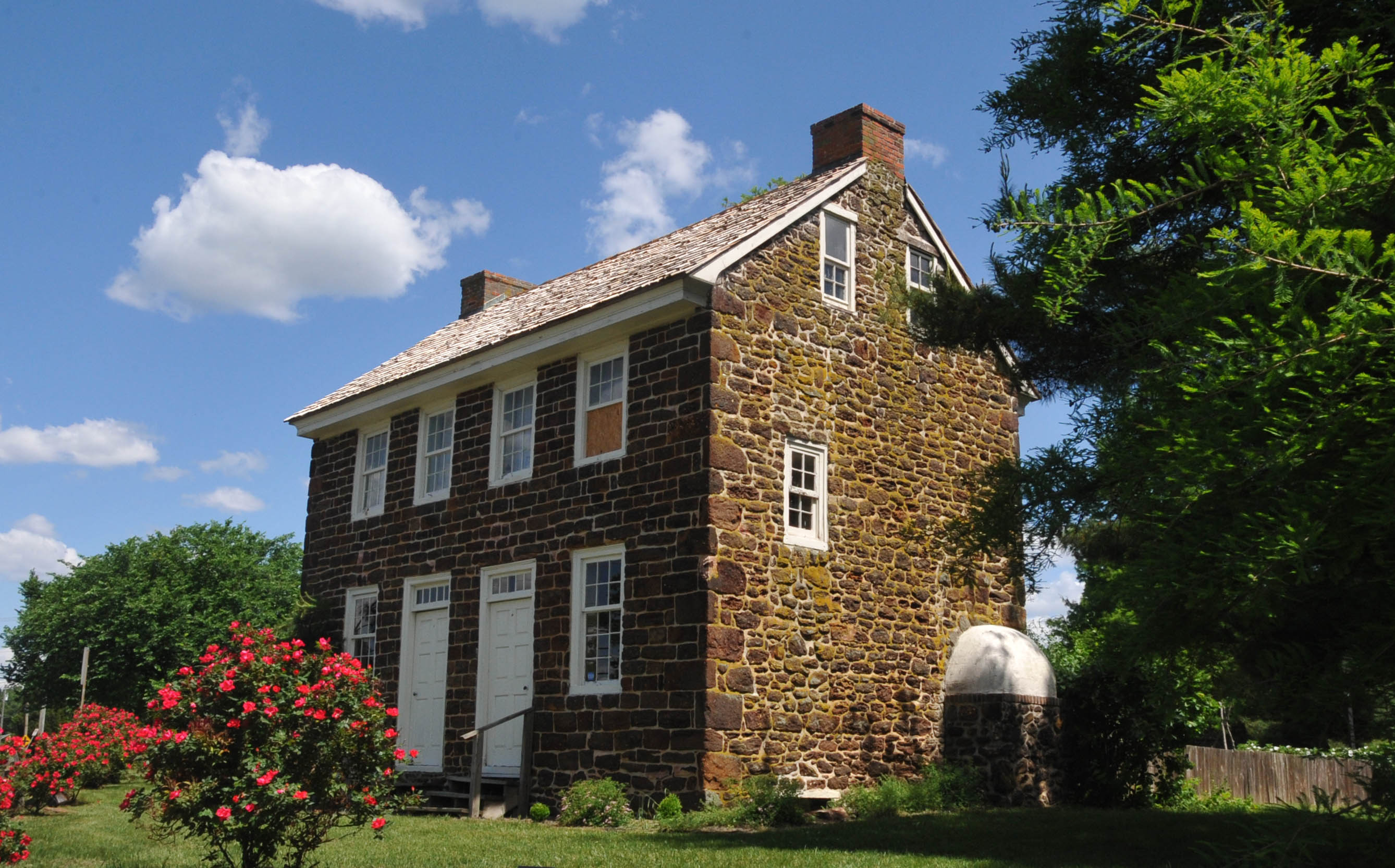
Side view showing beehive oven

== Museum and historic village ==
In September 1980, Washington Township acquired the Olde Stone House and 6.2 acres (2.5 ha) from the FPA corporation. In December, fire caused serious damage to the house. The Washington Township Historical Society restored it by 1986. The house is now a historic house museum operated by the Washington Township Historic Preservation Commission. Four other historic buildings from the township have been moved here to form the Olde Stone House Historic Village. They are the Turnersville Post Office (1864), the Bunker Hill Presbyterian Church (1869), the Charles Quay Farmhouse (1825), and the Blackwood Railroad Station (1891).

== See also ==
- National Register of Historic Places listings in Gloucester County, New Jersey
- List of the oldest buildings in New Jersey
- List of museums in New Jersey
