= Kicking Sunrise =

American soul/pop rock duo

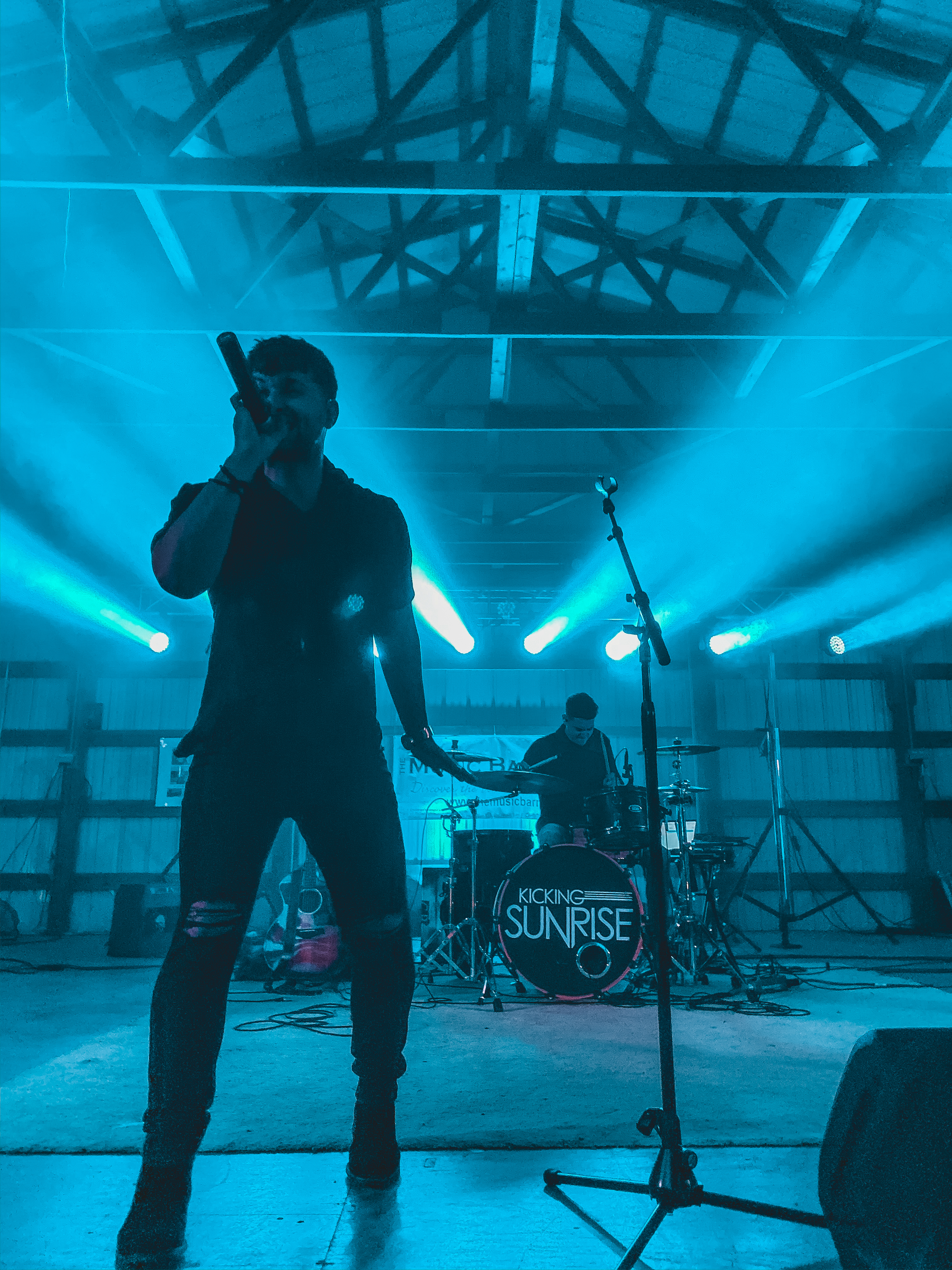
- Kicking Sunrise performing live at The Music Barn in Mullica Hill, New Jersey in October, 2019

Background information
- Origin: Washington Township (Gloucester County), New Jersey
- Genres: pop
- Years active: 2013–present
- Label: Right Coast Music
- Members: Joe Murphy; Mark Altamuro
- Website: kickingsunrise.com

Kicking Sunrise is an American soul/pop rock cover band from Washington Township, Gloucester County, New Jersey, consisting of Joe Murphy and Mark Altamuro. They released their single "Here's to the Sunrise" on April 10, 2015 and their album Here's to the Sunrise on June 2, 2015, of which both have been featured on CBS Philadelphia, TBS for Major League Baseball coverage and TNT for the 2015 PGA Championship at Whistling Straits. Kicking Sunrise also released their EP When It's Right on January 4, 2018.

== History ==
=== 2013–2016: Early career, Right Coast Music and Here's to the Sunrise ===
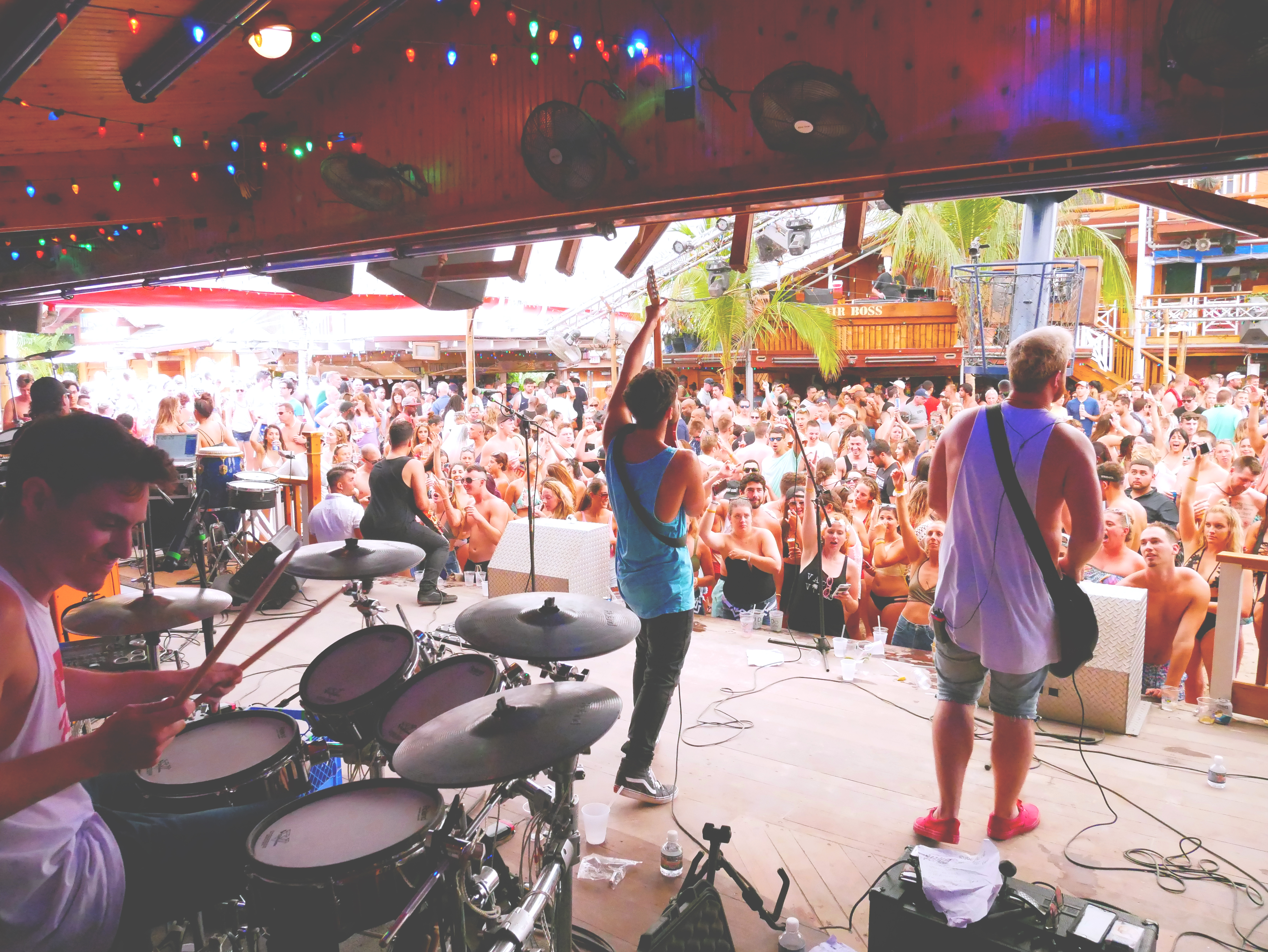
Kicking Sunrise performing live at Seacrets in Ocean City, Maryland in July, 2017.

Kicking Sunrise's first cover video featuring Justin Timberlake's Suit & Tie was released in January 2013 on YouTube and reached over 30,000 views. After receiving feedback on the video, Kicking Sunrise began composing and producing their own music.

In August 2013, Kicking Sunrise performed at a block party for the independent record label, Right Coast Music. Kicking Sunrise signed to Right coast Music in March 2014. The independent record label commented after signing Kicking Sunrise: "This is a great era to be launching new music, and we are grateful for the opportunity to bring new and exciting music to the worldwide community."

To get some inspiration while writing Here's to the Sunrise, Kicking Sunrise drove from Washington Township (Gloucester County), New Jersey to Huntington Beach, California and lived on the West Coast for ten months. The album took about three months to write, and is a combination of pop, hip hop and R&B. Lead singer Joe Murphy stated that, "It's a feel good, summertime beach vibe. It's chill."

Kicking Sunrise released their album Here's to the Sunrise through Right Coast Music on June 2, 2015. They released one promotional single from the album: "Here's to the Sunrise" on April 10, 2015. Kicking Sunrise states that on the album, "You can expect a lot of diversity. The album has a lot of different sounds and songs but all have a core sound, where you know it's Kicking Sunrise."

Kicking Sunrise released a music video of their single "Here's to the Sunrise" on Vevo in June, 2016.

Kicking Sunrise also released two acoustic videos of their songs from the Here's to the Sunrise album. They released "This Life of Mine LIVE (Acoustic)" in May, 2015 and "Brand New (Acoustic)" in August, 2015.

In April 2016, Kicking Sunrise was selected to perform their single "Here's to the Sunrise" live on CBS Philadelphia's morning show hosted by Jim Donovan. Kicking Sunrise is currently the house band of CBS Philadelphia and their single "Here's to the Sunrise" is the theme song of the morning show.

=== 2017–present: When It's Right, Stay Beautiful, Underneath, Reaching Out, Rest of My Life and Forever ===
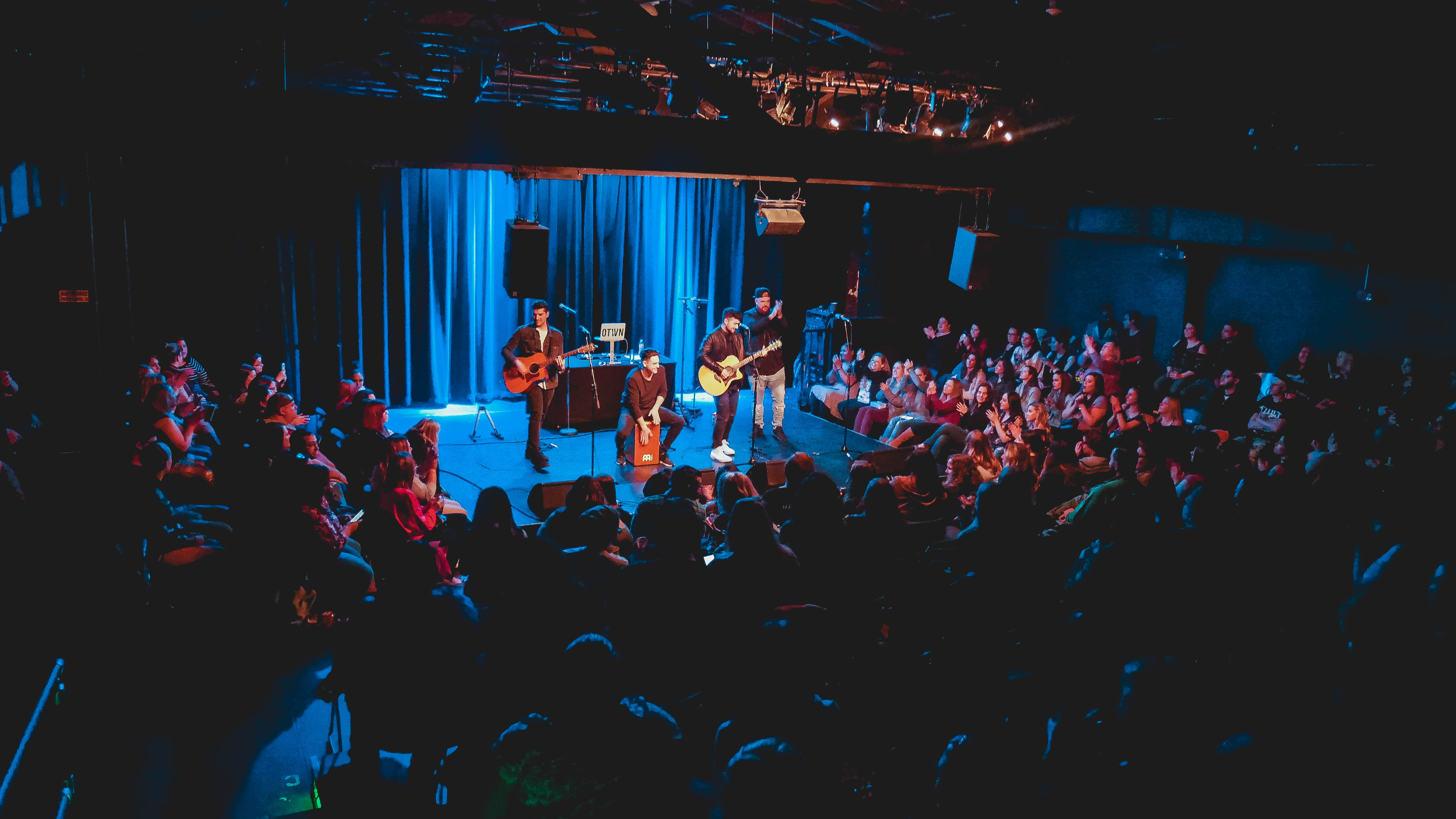
Kicking Sunrise opening for O-town at Stage One at FTC in Fairfield, Connecticut in March, 2018.

Kicking Sunrise released their EP When It's Right on January 4, 2018. The EP contains five singles of which three were released prior to the release of the full EP.

Kicking Sunrise released their single "Take It All" on August 7, 2017. The single features Ryan Hornibrook on lead vocals. Kicking Sunrise also released their single "Another Life" on October 2, 2017.

On December 1, 2017 Kicking Sunrise released their single "Sky High." The single features Joe Murphy on lead vocals followed by Ryan Hornibrook on backing vocals. According to Murphy, "Sky High gives you that self-confidence when you're doubting yourself. This song was written to remind you that it's okay to accept who you are and allows you to recognize the obstacles that makes you a stronger individual today." "Sky High" has a "feel good funk" sound and contains exciting, upbeat elements throughout the song.

The other two singles "Give Me Tonight" and "By Myself" were released along with their EP When It's Right on January 4, 2018.

Kicking Sunrise's single "Stay Beautiful" was released under the record label Right Coast Music on January 25, 2019.

On August 23, 2019, Kicking Sunrise released their single "Underneath". According to Sound in Review, "Underneath has all the elements of a hit pop tune, a catchy melody, a beat that makes you wanna move, full vocal harmonies and lush full production of well-played instruments."

The group's single, "Reaching Out" was released under the record label Right Coast Music on November 15, 2019.

On February 12, 2021, Kicking Sunrise released their single "Rest of My Life", which serves as living record of Murphy's marriage proposal in Sunset Beach, New Jersey. In the visual for the single, Murphy's girlfriend (and now-fiancée) believes she is helping capture footage for a new project, but soon realizes that it'll be a day she remembers for the rest of her life. After its release, Murphy stated "We’ll look back at this video and be able to reconnect with how much this moment meant to us and the unconditional love we have for each other. This is something we’ll have for years to come and hopefully share with our grandchildren someday." The duo also released their newest single "Forever" on March 12, 2021.

== Influences ==
Considering Kicking Sunrise's music has a lot of diversity, both members have different influences. Joe Murphy listens to artists such as John Mayer, Gavin DeGraw and Adam Levine. Mark Altamuro has more of a hardcore punk/rock style of drumming. Some of Altamuro's influences include Tony Royster Jr., Darren King, Travis Barker, and Aric Improta. All of Kicking Sunrise's influences played a major role in the making of their album Here's to the Sunrise.

== Members ==
Current members

- Joe Murphy – lead vocals, rhythm guitar (2013–present)
- Mark Altamuro – drums (2013–present)

Former members

- Matt Bosco – lead guitar, bass guitar, backing vocals (2013–2019)
- Ryan Hornibrook – bass guitar, backing vocals (2013–2020)

Timeline

== Filmography ==
=== TV appearances ===
Year	Title	Notes
2018	CBS Philadelphia	Appeared in a CBS Philadelphia commercial featuring single Here's to the Sunrise
2016	CBS Philadelphia	Performed single Here's to the Sunrise in Washington Township (Gloucester County), New Jersey
2016	The Pavlina Show	Performed Here's to the Sunrise and Things I Like on The Pavlina Show
2016	CBS Philadelphia	Performed single Here's to the Sunrise on CBS Philadelphia
2015	TBS	This Life of Mine featured for Major League Baseball coverage
2015	TNT	Single Here's to the Sunrise featured for the 2015 PGA Championship at Whistling Straits
2015	TBS	Single Here's to the Sunrise featured for Major League Baseball coverage

== Discography ==
=== Albums ===
- Here's to the Sunrise (2015)

=== EPs ===
- When It's Right (2018)

=== Singles ===
- Here's to the Sunrise (2015)
- Another Life (2017)
- Sky High (2017)
- Take It All (2017)
- Give Me Tonight (2018)
- By Myself (2018)
- Right One, Wrong Time (2018)
- Stay Beautiful (2019)
- Underneath (2019)
- Reaching Out (2019)
- Rest of My Life (2021)
- Forever (2021)

== Music videos ==
- Here's to the Sunrise (2016)
- Right One, Wrong Time (2018)
- Rest of My Life (2021)
- Forever (2021)
