= Washington Township High School =

Washington Township High School may refer to:

- Washington Township High School (Indiana), Valparaiso, Indiana
- Washington Township High School (New Jersey), Sewell, New Jersey
