= Jamal Whitehead =

American judge (born 1979)

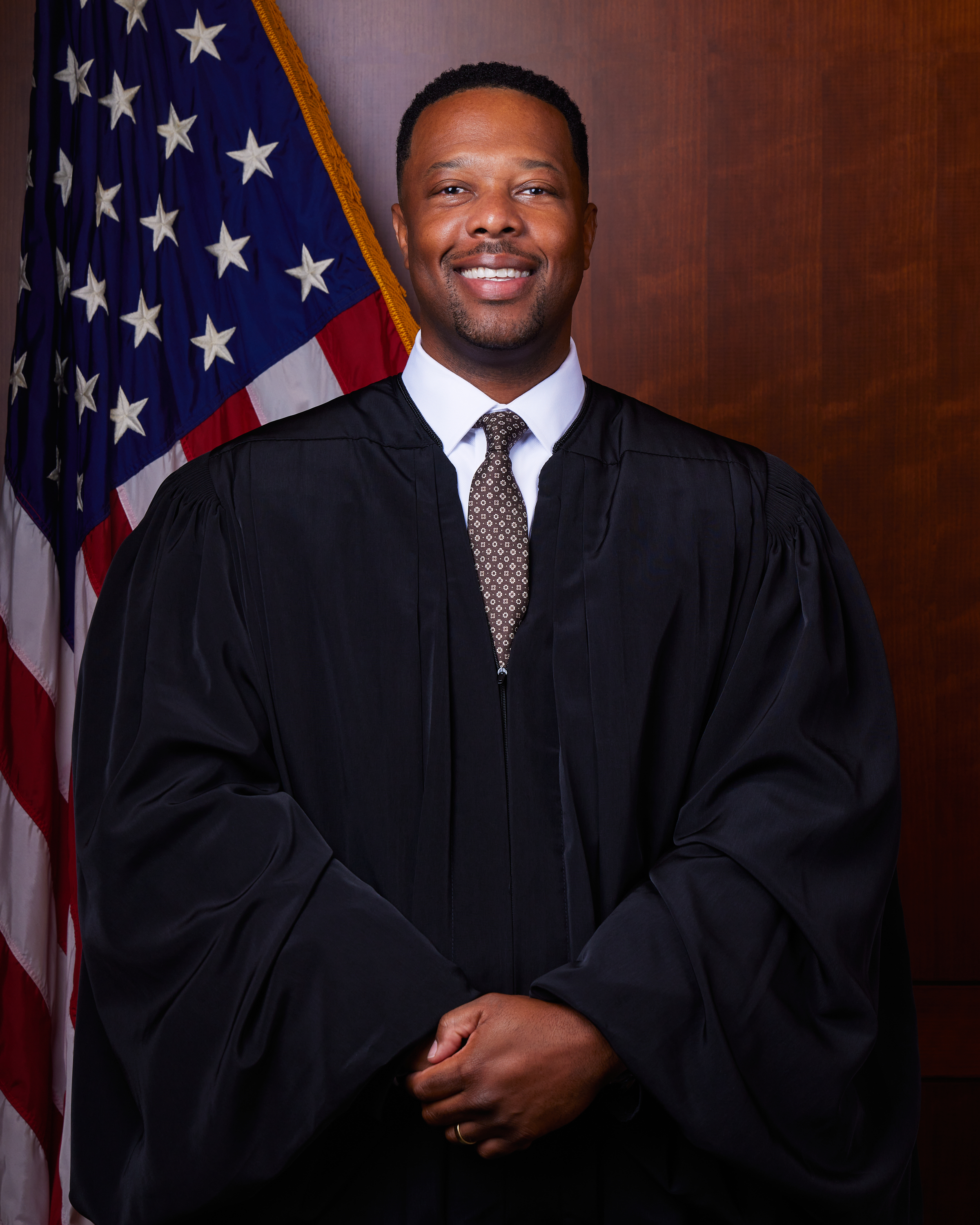

Judge of the United States District Court for the Western District of Washington
- Incumbent
- Assumed office March 14, 2023
- Appointed by: Joe Biden
- Preceded by: Richard A. Jones

Personal details
- Born: Jamal Norman Whitehead; 1979 (age 46–47) Turnersville, New Jersey, U.S.
- Education: University of Washington (BA); Seattle University (JD)

Jamal Norman Whitehead (born 1979) is an American lawyer who is a United States district judge of the United States District Court for the Western District of Washington.

== Early life and education ==
Whitehead was born in the Turnersville section of Washington Township, Gloucester County, New Jersey. He earned a Bachelor of Arts degree in political science from the University of Washington in 2004 and a Juris Doctor from the Seattle University School of Law in 2007.

== Career ==
From 2007 to 2010, Whitehead worked as an attorney at Garvey Schubert Barer in Seattle. From 2010 to 2014, he served as a senior trial attorney in the Seattle office of the Equal Employment Opportunity Commission. From 2014 to 2016, he served as an Assistant United States Attorney for the Western District of Washington. From 2016 to 2023, he was a shareholder at Schroeter Goldmark & Bender in Seattle. Whitehead is a past president of the Loren Miller Bar Association, Washington's oldest and largest minority bar.

=== Notable cases ===
In 2018, Whitehead served as co-counsel for a disabled car dealership employee after he was fired by Mercedes-Benz of Seattle when he began using a prosthetic voice box to speak. Whitehead tried the case to verdict before a federal jury, which returned a $5 million verdict in his client's favor. The car dealership appealed the verdict, and Whitehead successfully argued the case before the Ninth Circuit Court of Appeals. The Court would later affirm the trial court's judgment.

In 2021, Whitehead represented private plaintiffs when they sued a private prison, GEO Group, for paying incarcerated ICE detainees $1 a day in its work program. The Court appointed Whitehead as class counsel for over 10,000 detained persons seeking back wages. The state of Washington stated the company must pay detainees the state minimum wage, just as other private corporations doing contract work with the state are required to. After a three-week trial, a federal jury returned a verdict of $17.3 million to the class of workers.

== Federal judicial service ==
On July 13, 2022, President Joe Biden nominated Whitehead to serve as a United States district judge of the United States District Court for the Western District of Washington. President Biden nominated Whitehead to the seat vacated by Judge Richard A. Jones, who subsequently assumed senior status on September 5, 2022. On September 21, 2022, a hearing on his nomination was held before the Senate Judiciary Committee. On December 1, 2022, his nomination was reported out of committee by a 12–10 vote. On January 3, 2023, his nomination was returned to the President under Rule XXXI, Paragraph 6 of the United States Senate; he was renominated later the same day. On February 2, 2023, his nomination was reported out of committee by an 11–9 vote. On February 28, 2023, the Senate invoked cloture on his nomination by a 51–43 vote. Later that day, his nomination was confirmed by a 51–43 vote. He received his judicial commission on March 14, 2023. He was sworn in on April 4, 2023.

=== Notable cases ===
On February 25, 2025, Whitehead issued a preliminary injunction against Executive Order 14163, which would indefinitely suspend the U.S. Refugee Admissions Program. While conceding the broad discretion of the President in limiting refugee admissions, Whitehead ruled that the extent of the limitations - that being setting the annual refugee admission goal to zero - overstepped both the President's authority and congressional refugee frameworks. In doing so, Whitehead contended that the order stood in violation of both the Refugee Act of 1980 and the Administrative Procedure Act, which respectively laid out the refugee admissions process and required a period of public comment to be issued.

== Personal life ==
During her introduction in front of the United States Senate Committee on the Judiciary, senator Patty Murray said that Whitehead was the first judicial nominee by President Joe Biden to have a physical disability (he uses a prosthetic leg).

== See also ==
- List of African American federal judges
- List of African American jurists

Legal offices
Preceded by Richard A. Jones	Judge of the United States District Court for the Western District of Washington; 2023–present	Incumbent
