= Spruce Creek High School =

Coordinates: 29.108728°N 81.015936°W

Location
- 801 Taylor Road; Port Orange, Florida, 32127

Information
- Type: Public High School
- Motto: Service; Opportunity; Academics; Responsibility (SOAR)
- Established: 1975
- School district: Volusia County Schools
- Principal: Todd Sparger
- Faculty: 115.02 (FTE)
- Grades: 9−12
- Enrollment: 2,568 (2023-2024)
- Student to teacher ratio: 22.33
- Colors: Orange; Black; White
- Mascot: Hawk
- Yearbook: Flight
- Website: www.sprucecreekhigh.com

Spruce Creek High School is a public secondary school located in the city of Port Orange, Florida. It is the largest IB high school in North America and is one of Newsweek's Top 100 High Schools. Spruce Creek High School is part of the Volusia County Schools system, which encompasses eight other high schools and 80 schools total. The one-story campus is dominated by a single, contiguous main building, with a separate, smaller multi-purpose building and several portable classroom buildings (a total of 48 as of 2016), which are spread out across the campus. The school has been named a Blue Ribbon School of Excellence, as well as a Florida Music Demonstration School several years in a row. It was ranked first in North America and third in the world for the number of IB exams administered.

== Academics ==
Spruce Creek High School has a program of studies that includes International Baccalaureate, Advanced Placement, and Honors courses. More than $6,400,000 in scholarship money was earned by 2011 graduates.

=== IB Program ===
Spruce Creek offers the International Baccalaureate Diploma Programme. The program was established on July 3, 1989. As of the 2009–2010 school year, it is the largest IB school in North America, and number three in the world, based on the number of IB exams administered.

=== Academy of Finance ===
The Academy of Finance exposes students to the financial services industry.

=== The Academy of Information Technology and Robotics ===
The Academy of Information Technology and Robotics, also known as AITR, is designed to introduce high school students to the rapidly expanding digital and technological workplace and to the wide variety of career opportunities that it offers. Students take courses in programming, database administration, web design, digital design, PC repair and networking. Also offered are courses in Game and Simulation Design and Engineering.

The AITR Academy acts as its own "school inside of a school." There are no bells, and students are allowed to roam between the Academy classrooms to visit specific teachers for help in any specific subject area. Students participate in group challenges divided into hexmesters, which encompass core subjects. Students use the mornings to focus on their core work, and spend the afternoons working on their technology class, one of the courses listed above. Also available is a Robotics program. The AITR program is the sponsor of FIRST Robotics Competition Team 2152.

=== Business Cooperative Education ===
Business Cooperative Education is a training program for students planning careers in business and/ or office occupations. Students go to school in the morning and work each afternoon on the job for an average of 15−25 hours per week. It is a cooperative effort between the school, parents, the student and the employer. All cooperate to assist the student-trainee in applying on the job what her or she is learning in class. BCE helps prepare students not only for his or her career upon graduation, but also for college business courses and for college expenses.

Ryan Lochte, US Olympic gold medalist swimmer attended Spruce Creek. In Lochte's junior year at Spruce Creek the swimming team won the Class 3A Florida State Boys' Swimming Championship coached by his father Steve Lochte and Brad Richdale.

As of the 2015−2016 school year, the Spruce Creek boys' weightlifting team has won 26 Florida State Weightlifting Championships, and has 80+ individual Florida State Weightlifting Champions. They also hold the record for the longest streak of consecutive championships at 11, from 1994 to 2004. Since the end of that streak, Creek has added another title in 2006, came in 3rd place in 2007, and won championships in 2008, 2013, and 2016. The Creek girls' weightlifting team won Florida State Championships in 2004, 2005, 2006, 2007, 2008, 2009, 2011 and 2012.

In 2012, the Creek varsity baseball team won the Class 8A state championship against Miami Christopher Columbus 7−1.

== Music and Performing Arts ==
The Spruce Creek Musical Performing Arts department has received numerous awards and invitations to events across the country and around the world. Such events have included the Tournament of Roses Parade in Pasadena, California, and at venues abroad in France, Germany, the Netherlands, England, China, and Ireland. It is the annual co-host of Port Orange's annual Lakeside Jazz Festival along with Atlantic High School's music program. In 2008 it was announced that the Band and Orchestra would be traveling to Europe in 2010. This trip included visits to Germany, Austria, and the Netherlands, where they performed at various venues. The marching band and color guard have also marched in the Inaugural Parade for Florida's governor, Rick Scott in 2011. The band and color guard have received straight superiors at all marching competitions for the past 26 years. In November of the 2011−2012 school year it was announced that all of Spruce Creek's bands (three jazz bands, two concert bands, one full orchestra, and a marching band of over 200 members) and color guard had been invited to do a nine-day performance tour across Ireland which would include performing in the annual St. Patrick's Day Parade in Dublin in 2013, where they won the award for best overall band.

In addition to the music program, Spruce Creek has a theatre program. The Drama department has traveled to Scotland, and received superiors from the District and State level thespian festivals. The program has included many Honor and National thespians.

== Notable alumni ==
- Perry Baker, professional rugby player with the United States national rugby sevens team
- Kenny Flowers, professional football player
- Tony Gibson, NASCAR Champion Crew Chief of the 2017 Daytona 500 for winning driver Kurt Busch
- Austin Hays, MLB All-Star outfielder for the Baltimore Orioles
- Ryan Lochte, American competitive swimmer and a twelve-time Olympic medalist
- Ed Lucas, former professional baseball player (Miami Marlins)
- Kim Mack, professional football player
- Bruce McNorton, former NFL cornerback for the Detroit Lions and Miami Dolphins
- Stacey Mobley, professional football player
- Pavlina Osta, news personality
- Preston Pardus, racing driver
- Nick Regilio, former professional baseball player (Texas Rangers)
- Rex Tullius, Olympic swimmer
- Zac Veen, 9th overall pick to Colorado Rockies in 2020 MLB Draft
