= Investors Bank Performing Arts Center =

Theater in Washington Township, in Gloucester County, New Jersey

Coordinates: 39.745276°N 75.078056°W

The Investors Bank Performing Arts Center is a 2,400-seat theater located in Washington Township, in Gloucester County, New Jersey, United States, that is one of South Jersey's major entertainment venues.

Completed in 1998, the 2,400-seat Center was originally designed as the auditorium for Washington Township High School, built to hold the school's 2,000 student body. During the planning stages of the facility, officials decided that the auditorium should host large scale productions in an effort to bring local and regional entertainment to the area.

Now known as the Investors Bank Arts Center, the center originally opened its doors on September 1, 1998, with a production of Rodgers and Hammerstein's The King & I.

== History ==
Before being known as the Investors Bank Arts Center, it was the TD Bank Arts Center, the Commerce Bank Arts Centre, and originally the Washington Township High School's Center for the Performing Arts (CPA) when it opened in 1998. In 1999, Chesapeake Concerts Inc. had to terminate their contract in September via a 60-day escape clause due to the death of its CEO, who died in August. In 2000, the Board of Education hired Township resident Rebecca Marie Keith as the center's manager/grant writer." Keith was dividing her time between writing grants to bring revenues to the center, and also scheduling the performances. In 2004, with a five-year, $300,000 investment, Commerce Bank was looking to capitalize on the school district's performing arts venue. Commerce Bank chairman and president presented Superintendent Thomas Flemming with a $55,000 check after announcing the new name of the CPA, which thereafter became the Commerce Bank Arts Centre. By taking the new name and the $300,000 investment scheduled over the next five years, it would be providing three arts-related scholarships each year, a summer theater program, upgrade in the lighting and sound, and co-sponsor additional events at the center.

In 2015, the name was changed to the Investors Bank Performing Arts Center. It is currently named the Republic Bank Performing Arts Center.

== Previous events ==
- Styx
- Natalie Merchant
- Dwight Yoakam
- Delirious
- Mamma Mia! (musical)
- Trisha Yearwood
- Grease
- Weird Al Yankovic
- Sawyer Brown
- Barry Manilow
- Moody Blues
- k.d. lang
- Jo Dee Messina
- Willie Nelson
- Mary Chapin Carpenter
- Plus One
- A Walk Down Abbey Road
- Jessica Simpson
- Lone Star
- Kenny Rogers
- Point of Grace
- Twila Paris
- Lee Ann Womack
- Plus One
- Wayne Brady
- Jubilate Deo
- Philadelphia Orchestra
- Indigo Girls
- Pennsylvania Ballet
- "Cabaret"
- George Carlin
- "Swing"
- B. B. King
- Atlantic Contemporary Ballet Theatre
- South Pacific
- David Copperfield
- Frankie Valli
- Paul Anka
- Anne Murray
- Charlie Daniels Band
- Lord of the Dance
- Hero – A Rock Opera
- Rent
- Saturday Night Fever
- CATS
- Tim Conway & Harvey Korman
- Sandy Patty
- John Michael Montgomery
- STOMP!
- "The Rat Pack"
- The Irish Tenors
- Clay Aiken
- Bill Cosby
- Fiddler On The Roof
- Tony Bennett
- Crazy For You
- Andy Williams
- Engelbert Humperdinck
- 42nd Street
- Chris Tomlin
- Big Comfy Couch
- Barenaked Ladies
- Dave Koz & Friends
- Blast!
- Lewis Black
- Jordin Sparks
- Jesse McCartney

== Crew ==
Crew for performances at the center is provided by the International Alliance of Theatrical Stage Employees Local 8.

== Additional facts ==
- In 2002, using $150,000 in state grants and loans, the Washington Township High School Center for the Performing Arts (CPA) purchased and installed an “orchestra shell”. By installing this “shell” it projects the sound out and to the audience.
- The school district used a $75,000 state grant which was obtained by State Senator John J. Matheussen, R-4 of Washington Township, as a year end 2001 “Christmas Tree appropriation” and $75,000 left over from the bonds sold to fund the construction of the CPA.
