= WAPN =

- Holly Hill, Florida; United States
- Broadcast area: Daytona Beach
- Frequency: 91.5 MHz

Programming
- Format: Christian radio

Ownership
- Owner: Public Radio, Inc.

History
- Call sign meaning: Word and Praise Network

Technical information
- Licensing authority: FCC
- Facility ID: 53836
- Class: A
- ERP: 1,800 watts
- HAAT: 87 meters (285 ft)
- Transmitter coordinates: 29°15′6.00″N 81°2′53.00″W

Links
- Public license information: Public file; LMS
- Website: wapn.net

WAPN (91.5 MHz) is a non-commercial, listener-supported FM radio station broadcasting a Christian talk and teaching radio format. Licensed to Holly Hill, Florida, the station serves the Daytona Beach area. The station is currently owned by Public Radio, Inc. Programming is simulcast on 91.7 WAPB in Madison, Florida.

Popular WAPN programs include Prayerline, Miracles Today with Pastor Chris Sarno, Lighthouse for Christ with Pastor Ron Fussell, Pavlina's Kidz Place with Pavlina Osta, and He Loves Even Me Ministries with Carl Harrington.
