= Washington Township Public School District =

School district in Gloucester County, New Jersey, US

Address
- 206 East Holly Avenue Washington Township, Gloucester County, New Jersey, 08080; United States
- Coordinates: 39.74457°N 75.108991°W

District information
- Grades: PreK-12
- Superintendent: Eric Hibbs
- Business administrator: Janine M. Wechter
- Schools: 11

Students and staff
- Enrollment: 7,302 (as of 2023–24)
- Faculty: 654.0 FTEs
- Student–teacher ratio: 11.2:1

Other information
- District Factor Group: FG
- Website: www.wtps.org
Ind.	Per pupil	District spending	Rank (*)	K-12 average	%± vs. average
1A	Total Spending	$18,482	49	$18,891	−2.2%
1	Budgetary Cost	15,571	70	14,783	5.3%
2	Classroom Instruction	9,156	70	8,763	4.5%
6	Support Services	2,559	71	2,392	7.0%
8	Administrative Cost	1,750	91	1,485	17.8%
10	Operations & Maintenance	1,588	46	1,783	−10.9%
13	Extracurricular Activities	304	74	268	13.4%
16	Median Teacher Salary	70,930	79	64,043
Data from NJDoE 2014 Taxpayers' Guide to Education Spending. *Of K-12 districts with more than 3,500 students. Lowest spending=1; Highest=103

The Washington Township Public School District is a comprehensive community public school district that serves students in pre-kindergarten through twelfth grade from Washington Township, in Gloucester County, in the U.S. state of New Jersey.

As of the 2023–24 school year, the district, comprised of 11 schools, had an enrollment of 7,302 students and 654.0 classroom teachers (on an FTE basis), for a student–teacher ratio of 11.2:1.

The district had been classified by the New Jersey Department of Education as being in District Factor Group "FG", the fourth-highest of eight groupings. District Factor Groups organize districts statewide to allow comparison by common socioeconomic characteristics of the local districts. From lowest socioeconomic status to highest, the categories are A, B, CD, DE, FG, GH, I and J.

== Awards and recognition ==
For the 2005–06 school year, the Washington Township Public School District was recognized with the "Best Practices Award" by the New Jersey Department of Education for its "Creating Proficient Readers and Writers" Professional Development program at Birches Elementary School.

For the 2004–05 school year, both Birches Elementary School and Whitman Elementary School were named as "Star Schools" by the New Jersey Department of Education, the highest state honor that a New Jersey school can achieve.

== Schools ==
Schools in the district (with 2023–24 enrollment data from the National Center for Education Statistics) are:

Preschool

- Grenloch Terrace Early Childhood Center with 999 students in pre-kindergarten
  - Christina Cox, principal

Elementary schools

- Bells Elementary School with 552 students in grades K–5
  - Shaun Giberson, principal
- Birches Elementary School with 453 students in grades K–5
  - Julie LaRubbio, principal
- Hurffville Elementary School with 555 students in grades K–5
  - Erica Holck, principal
- Thomas Jefferson Elementary School with 482 students in grades K–5
  - Tricia Holmes, principal
- Wedgewood Elementary School with 473 students in grades K–5
  - Ginny Grier, principal
- Whitman Elementary School with 557 students in grades K–5
  - Julie Hopp, principal

Middle schools

- Bunker Hill Middle School with 575 students in grades 6–8
  - Allison Egizi, principal
- Chestnut Ridge Middle School with 656 students in grades 6–8
  - Theresa Pietrowski, principal
- Orchard Valley Middle School with 526 students in grades 6–8
  - Kayla Berry, principal

High school

- Washington Township High School with 2,108 students in grades 9–12
  - Raymond Anderson, executive principal

== Administration ==
Core members of the district's administration are:

- Eric Hibbs, superintendent (until June 30, 2027)
- TBA, superintendent (starting July 1, 2027)
- Janine M. Wechter, business administrator and board secretary

Hibbs assumed the position in May 2023. The Board of Education chose not to renew his contract after it expires on June 30, 2027 following a 5-4 vote at their meeting on September 15, 2026. Hibbs had been suspended by the board in March 2025 but the suspension was overturned by a Gloucester County Superior Court judge and he returned to work in August 2025.

== Board of education ==
The district's board of education, composed of nine members, sets policy and oversees the fiscal and educational operation of the district through its administration. As a Type II school district, the board's trustees are elected directly by voters to serve three-year terms of office on a staggered basis, with three seats up for election each year held (since 2012) as part of the November general election. The board appoints a superintendent to oversee the district's day-to-day operations and a business administrator to supervise the business functions of the district.
