= Washington Township High School (New Jersey) =

High school in Gloucester County, New Jersey, US

Location
- 519 Hurffville-Cross Keys Road; Sewell, Gloucester County, New Jersey 08080; United States; 39.741073°N 75.077862°W

Information
- Type: Public high school
- Motto: "Together With Pride"
- Established: 1966
- NCES School ID: 341707002640
- Executive principal: Raymond F. Anderson
- Faculty: 167.2 FTEs
- Grades: 9-12
- Enrollment: 2,108 (as of 2023–24)
- Student to teacher ratio: 12.6:1
- Colors: Red white and blue
- Athletics conference: Olympic Conference (general); West Jersey Football League (football)
- Team name: Minutemen; Minutemaids
- Publication: Pieces (literary magazine)
- Newspaper: The Patriot
- Yearbook: Musket
- Website: wths.wtps.org

Washington Township High School is a four-year public high school located in Washington Township, in Gloucester County, in the U.S. state of New Jersey. The school serves students in ninth through twelfth grades as the lone secondary school of the Washington Township Public School District. It is one of the largest public high schools in South Jersey. The school building itself is just over a quarter of a mile long. It is located at 509, 519 and 529 Hurffville-Cross Keys Road.

As of the 2023–24 school year, the school had an enrollment of 2,108 students and 167.2 classroom teachers (on an FTE basis), for a student–teacher ratio of 12.6:1. There were 331 students (15.7% of enrollment) eligible for free lunch and 83 (3.9% of students) eligible for reduced-cost lunch.

Washington Township High School is the home of the Republic Bank Performing Arts Center, known until 2022 as the Investors Bank Performing Arts Center, a 2,500-seat performing arts center located at the center of the school. Most of the school's concerts and events are held there, and many notables have performed in this center, including the Barenaked Ladies, Tony Bennett, Wayne Brady, George Carlin, David Copperfield, Bill Cosby, B. B. King, Barry Manilow, Willie Nelson, Kenny Rogers, Jessica Simpson, Lewis Black, Pete Davidson, and "Weird Al" Yankovic.

== Awards, recognition and rankings ==
The school was the 149th-ranked public high school in New Jersey out of 339 schools statewide in New Jersey Monthly magazine's September 2014 cover story on the state's "Top Public High Schools," using a new ranking methodology. The school had been ranked 165th in the state of 328 schools in 2012, after being ranked 175th in 2010 out of 322 schools listed. The magazine ranked the school 149th in 2008 out of 316 schools. The school was ranked 150th in the magazine's September 2006 issue, which surveyed 316 schools across the state.

== History ==
=== 11–12 Wing ===
Construction on what is now the 11–12 wing of the high school began in 1962. WTHS opened in September 1963, serving grades 6–9 while parts of the building were still under construction. Each successive year, all of the grades incremented by 1 (1964 was 7–10, 1965 was 8–11 and 1966 was 9–12) In 1966 the first High School Class of WTHS graduated. In the early 1970s, the school became overcrowded (a problem that would plague the school on and off through 1998). In the fall of 1968, the 7th grade was sent to the new Birches Elementary School, occupying 1/2 of that facility. For the 1969/70 school year, the 7th grade returned to WTHS which operated an AM and PM session, staggered over 4 lunch periods. The 9th through 12th grades taking the morning session and the 7th and 8th grades, the afternoon. In the 1970–71 school year, the 7th grade was sent to Wedgewood Middle School and WTHS operated a traditional single session. In the 1971–1972 school year, the 7th and 8th were sent to Wedgewood Middle School and the school operated split sessions with grades 11–12 attending from 7:30 AM to noon and grades 9–10 attending 12:30 PM to 5:00 PM. For 1972–73 it was back to split sessions in the high school with grades 10–12 taking the morning shift. As a result, a two-story addition was opened in September 1973 to the right side of the building, as well as an additional gym and a new library. The school continued to serve students in grade 7–12 until the 1979–1980 school year. As a result of this overcrowding and moving of grades, the Class of 1975 was the youngest class as 7th graders, then again the youngest class as 8th graders, then again the youngest class as 9th graders, and finally, with split sessions, the youngest class in their session, as 10th graders.

=== 9–10 Wing ===
In the late 1970s, construction on what would be the township's first middle school began. In September 1980, WTMS opened, serving 7th and 8th graders. Because of its location right next to WTHS (at the time, what is now the location of the Core was just a parking lot), the two schools would often share facilities.

Despite a new rather large school to house 7th and 8th graders, and more room in the high school, the township was exploding in population at the time, and both WTHS and WTMS were overcrowded only a few years after the middle school opened. In the mid-1980s, planning for yet another new middle school was underway. This time, however, because WT's elementary schools also faced overcrowding, the school district went ahead and built two schools, which would enroll grades 6 through 8, thus relieving all the elementary schools in the district from 6th graders (they also were relieved of all kindergarteners, thanks to an addition at Grenloch Terrace Early Childhood Center). In fall of 1989, Chestnut Ridge Middle School and Orchard Valley Middle School opened for grades 6–8. The former WTMS became part of the high school complex, renamed as the 9/10 Building (as it served mostly students in 9th and 10th grade), while the original HS was also renamed as the 11/12 Building.

The transition wasn't smooth, however. Both CRMS and OVMS weren't finished in time for the new school year. As a result, the newly formed WTHS complex started its first month with split sessions. High school students would have class starting early in the day, while all middle school students would have class in the late afternoon/early evening. During this time period, the high school students also had to share their lockers with the temp middle school students.

The 9/10 building has H-Hall, I-Pod, J-Hall, K-Pod, and L-Pod. The "Pods" are large hallways with bathrooms in the center. The classrooms are arranged around the pods like a courtyard. There were lockers in the center of each pod, but they have since been removed due to the addition of the lockers in the core.

I-Pod: Originally called "A-Pod" before the 9/10 building was connected to the 11/12 building. The flooring is Red in the classrooms. The Student Assistance office and speech therapists are located here. K-Pod: Originally called "C-Pod" before the 9/10 building was connected to the 11/12 building. The flooring is Yellow in the classrooms. The math and science department office is here. L-Pod: Originally called "C-Pod" before the 9/10 building was connected to the 11/12 building. The flooring is Green in the classrooms. The 9/10 executive principals office is here.

H-Hall: Originally called "D-Hall" before the 9/10 building was connected to the 11/12 building. The bathrooms, main office, principals offices, restriction room, and wood shops are here. The 9/10 Gym is also here. The old 9/10 cafeteria was converted to the "Auxiliary Gym". The new cafeterias are in the core. J-Hall: Originally called "E-Hall" before the 9/10 building was connected to the 11/12 building. The adaptive gym, orchestra room and nurses office is downstairs. Upstairs are classrooms. The original library was here until the core expansion. The old library was converted to the 9/10 adaptive gym.

=== Core building ===
Washington Township's population continued to grow, therefore, they needed to expand the high school yet again. Under a $50 million district wide improvement program, a third building was to be built on the site between the 11/12 and 9/10 buildings. The Core building would physically connect the two existing buildings and would include a 2500-seat auditorium (known as the Investors Bank Performing Arts Center as of 2015, formerly known as Commerce Bank Arts Centre and the TD Bank Arts Centre), administrative and guidance offices, a new Media Center (library), new cafeteria (for 9–10 wing students) and more classrooms. Construction on the core building began in the summer of 1996. Parts of the building opened in 1998, and some classes were moved immediately from both the 11/12 and 9/10 buildings.

=== The new WTHS ===
The entire building was completed before the 1998–1999 school year. WTHS was now one building for the first time since the 1988–1989 school year. The three parts of the building were renamed the 11/12 wing, core, and 9/10 wing, and hallways were renamed to integrate the building. Because the new building featured a new library, a united guidance office, and cafeteria for the 9/10 wing, the old libraries and guidance offices in each of the wings as well as the old 9/10 cafeteria were able to be renovated for other uses.

== Athletics ==
The Washington Township High School Minutemen/Minutemaids compete in the Tri-County Conference, which is comprised of 23 public and private high schools located in the Camden, Cape May, Cumberland, Gloucester, and Salem counties, and operates under the aegis of the New Jersey State Interscholastic Athletic Association (NJSIAA). With 1,572 student athletes in grades 9–12 as of the 2022–2023 school year, the school was classified by the NJSIAA as Group IV for most athletic competition purposes, which included schools with an enrollment of 1,060 to 5,049 students in that grade range. The football team competes in the Continental Division of the 94-team West Jersey Football League superconference and was classified by the NJSIAA as Group V South for football for 2024–2026, which included schools with 1,333 to 2,324 students.

The school was a part of the Olympic Conference from 1965 until 2021, when it transferred in the 2022–23 school year to the Tri-County Conference alongside the Salem County Career and Technical High School. The change was primarily for the school to face opponents who were closer geographically.

The WTHS Sports Hall of Fame was founded in 1992 to honor outstanding WTHS athletes as well as residents of the township who have achieved success in athletics.

=== Athletic accomplishments ===
The boys' basketball team won the South Jersey Group II state sectional championship in 1969.

The field hockey team won the South Jersey Group III state sectional championship in 1977. The 1977 team finished the season with a 14–1–4 record after winning the Group III title with a 1–0 overtime victory against Phillipsburg High School in the championship game.

The softball team won the Group IV state championship in 1985 (vs. Westfield High School), 2002 (vs. West Milford High School), 2013 (vs. Watchung Hills Regional High School) and 2015 (vs. Bridgewater-Raritan High School). The 1985 team won the Group IV state title with a 1–0 victory against Westfield in the championship game. The team finished the 2015 season with a record of 31–1 after winning the Group IV title with a 1–0 one-hitter victory against Bridgewater-Raritan in the championship game. NJ.com / The Star-Ledger ranked Washington Township as their number-one softball team in the state in 2015.

The football team won the South Jersey Group IV state sectional championships in 1987, 1992, 1995, 2024 and 2025. The 1995 team finished the season with a 10–1 record after winning the South Jersey Group IV sectional title with a 19–7 defeat of Shawnee High School in the championship game. They won the Central Jersey Group V sectional championship in 2024, defeating Atlantic City 27-6. They secured their first state overall title in 2025, defeating Passaic County Technical Institute by a score of 31–12 in the Group V championship game.

The boys' wrestling team won the South Jersey Group IV state sectional championship in 1998, 2000 and 2010.

The girls' track team won the Group IV indoor relay state championship in 1999 and 2024. The boys team won the Group IV indoor relay title in 2009 and 2023.

The golf team won the New Jersey Group IV state championship in 1999.

The girls spring track team was Group IV co-champion in 2000.

The boys' cross country team captured the program's first ever South Jersey Group IV sectional crown in fall 2005.

The baseball team won the 2007 NJSIAA Group IV state championship, defeating Steinert High School 9–3 in the semifinals and Randolph High School 15–7 in the group final.

In 2007, the boys' soccer team won the South Jersey Group IV state sectional championship with a 1–0 win over Lenape High School in the tournament final.

The 07-08 boys' track team had the nation's top time in the 4x800 with a time of 8:06.95.

The 2009 boy's outdoor track team won the large high school division in the 4x800 at the Penn Relays.

The 08-09 girls' varsity lacrosse team won the South Jersey Group IV championship, beating division rivals Cherokee High School by a score of 10–9 in the section final to take the program's first state sectional. The 10–11 girls varsity lacrosse team went undefeated (8–0) as the Olympic Conference champions and won the South Jersey Group IV Championships, beating division rival Lenape High School by a score of 14–7 in the sectional final.

The boys bowling team won the Group IV state championship in 2010 and 2020, winning the state Tournament of Champions both of those years. The program is one of only three schools that have won the Tournament of Champions two or more times.

The 10–11 girls' basketball team won the South Jersey Group IV state sectional title as the 11th seed, knocking off top-seeded division rival Cherry Hill High School East (who entered the game with a 26–1 record) in the sectional final by a 46–43 score. The 11–12 girls' basketball team won the Olympic Conference and the South Jersey Group IV state sectional title, beating Toms River East High School in the sectional final by a score of 55–24, after starting the game on a 23-point run and leading 26–2 at the half. The 12–13 girls' basketball team won the Olympic Conference and their third consecutive South Jersey Group IV state sectional title, beating division rival Williamstown High School in the sectional final by a score of 50–38, sealing the victory with a 20–6 run after Williamstown had pulled ahead by two points in the fourth quarter.

The girls' bowling team won the Group IV state championship in 2011.

The Minutemen boys' soccer team won the Group IV state championships in 2014 (against runner-up Scotch Plains-Fanwood High School in the finals), 2015 (vs. West Orange High School) and 2018 (vs. Morris Knolls High School). The program earned their first title in program history in 2014 with a 1–0 win against Scotch Plains-Fanwood High School. The team repeated in 2015 by defeating West Orange High School by a score of 1–0 in the championship game. The team won the program's third Group IV title and finished the season with a 24–1 record after defeating Morris Knolls in the 2018 championship game.

== Music program ==
On April 22, 2011, the Orchestra participated and played at Carnegie Hall in the National Invitational Band and Orchestra Festival.

The Washington Township High School Wind Ensemble has been participating at the New Jersey State Gala at Rutgers University.

The Washington Township High School Minutemen Marching Band is a regionally and nationally recognized band. Under the direction of James Beyer, the band grew to over 225 members in 1997, the same year they achieved a 94.40 at the ACC Championships, a school record that still stands today. Later that season they participated in the 1998 Tournament of Roses Parade in Pasadena, California and became the first band to be decorated in 5,000 live flowers and seeds, creating the first ever "Marching Musical Float". Designed by Todd Marcocci, this unique concept and design approach received tremendous support from all major media around the world. The band has also participated in the 1995 and 1997 Philadelphia Thanksgiving Day Parade, invited to play for Governors Kean and Florio and President Reagan, the 2004 Gator Bowl in Jacksonville, Florida, the 2005 Holiday Bowl in San Diego, California and the 2008 Outback Bowl in Tampa, Florida. Since its inception in 1973, the band has placed in the top 10 at the Tournament of Bands (TOB) Atlantic Coast Championships 16 times, and was Chapter One Champions for 16 straight years from 1985 to 2000, winning the Group 3 title from 1985 to 1987 and the Group 4 titles the subsequent 13 years.

In recent years the band has undergone many changes, including becoming a separate ensemble (no longer a required part of the concert band program) and a director change, Casey Corigliano in 2003. In 2004, the Minutemen band became the first South Jersey band to compete in a Bands of America (BOA) Regional at Rutgers University, part of the nation's top marching circuit. The show was titled "The Odyssey". The band competes in class IV-A of the United States Scholastic Band Association (USSBA). The Minutemen host a home show every year titled Preview of Champions.

In the 2009–10 school year, the Minutemen band was named the 2009 USSBA Northern States Group 3A Champion. This was the band's first championship of any kind since the 16-year Chapter Championship streak was broken in 2001. The band was also named the 2010 Cotton Bowl Music Festival Grand Champion while participating in the Cotton Bowl Classic festivities in Dallas, Texas. By being named grand champion, the band had the honor of playing their show "Journey of Man" during pre-game in front of 78,000 fans. The WTHS Drumline also received first place and won the honor to play their cadence to bring all of the bands onto the field for the mass half time show at the 2010 Cotton Bowl.

Other recent bowl games include the 2012 BCS National Championship Game in New Orleans and the 2013 Alamo Bowl in San Antonio. The Minutemen placed 2nd place in field competition and parade competition. They also received the 2013 Alamo Bowl Spirit Award. This award is presented to the school who best embodies the definition of sportsmanship by positively representing their school and showing an overall enthusiasm for music and performance at the Alamo Bowl.

The Minutemen participated in the 2016 Liberty Bowl.

== Administration ==
The school's executive principal is Raymond F. Anderson, who took over in December 2022. His core administration team includes an executive assistant principal and five assistant principals. Previous principals have included Jonathon Strout and Rosemarie Farrow.

== Notable alumni ==
- Erik Alteri (born 1988, class of 2006) American political activist, public speaker, and advocate for cannabis reform. He served as the executive director of the National Organization for the Reform of Marijuana Laws (NORML) from November 2016 to March 2023, during which he played a prominent role in advancing cannabis legalization in the United States.
- Jim Auer (born 1962), former American football defensive end who played for the Philadelphia Eagles
- Jeff Baldwin (born 1965, class of 1983), former professional baseball player for the Houston Astros
- King Kong Bundy (born 1957, class of 1974), former WWF wrestler
- Ryan D'Imperio (born 1987, class of 2006), fullback drafted by the Minnesota Vikings
- Sam Esmail (born 1977, class of 1995), television producer known for Mr. Robot and Homecoming
- Linda Fiorentino (born 1958), actress, from Dogma, Men in Black and The Last Seduction
- Emily Gray (born 2000), soccer player who plays as a midfielder for North Carolina Courage of the National Women's Soccer League
- Antony Jordan (born 1974), professional American football player who played linebacker in the NFL for the Indianapolis Colts and Atlanta Falcons
- Cheryl Reeve (born 1966, class of 1984), head coach of Minnesota Lynx who is a two-time WNBA Coach of the Year
- Laura Schwanger (born 1958, class of 1977), retired American Paralympic athlete and adaptive rower
- Amy Wang (born 2002), table tennis player who competed at the 2024 Summer Olympics
- Scott Wiener (born 1970), politician who represents the 11th Senate District in the California State Senate
