= Pavlina Osta =

American radio personality

- Osta at the 2015 Gracie Award
- Born: Pavlina Jaine Francis Osta; September 26, 1997 (age 28); Daytona Beach, Florida, U.S.
- Education: Spruce Creek High School, Port Orange, Florida; The Kings College, New York City
- Occupations: News Anchor; Media Personality; Author; Radio Host; Executive Director of Podcasting
- Years active: 2009-present
- Employer(s): Pavlina’s Kidz Place (2009-2016); The Salem Media Group (2015-2021); Gray TV (2022-present)
- Known for: WLUC TV6 Evening News Co-anchor (2022-present); WLUC TV6 First Look Anchor (2022-present); Salem Media Executive Producer of National Podcasts (2016-2021); Recipient of 5 Gracie Awards; Guinness World Record Holder - Most Radio Interviews Conducted in 24 Hours
- Website: PavlinaOsta.com

Pavlina Osta (born September 26, 1997) is an American news anchor, radio personality, former Executive Producer for Salem Media Group, and former radio host of Pavlina's Kidz Place. As of March 2022, Osta was made evening news anchor for the Upper Peninsula dual NBC-Fox station WLUC. Osta is an accomplished classical ballet dancer and recipient of five Gracie Awards from 2014 to 2017. Her media career started as a steel drum street performer who became a radio host. Many of her interviews are on her YouTube channel.

After gaining experience as an interviewer and journalist for local radio stations (WAPN, Holly Hill, Florida; WAPB, Madison, Florida; and WELE, Ormond Beach, Florida), she began a YouTube channel and became syndicated on 24 stations. By the time she turned 18, Pavlina had interviewed over 800 public figures, including actors, musicians, politicians, athletes, and celebrities.

== Early life and education ==
Osta was born on September 26, 1997, in Daytona Beach, Volusia County, Florida to Leigh (Pratt) and Ghazi Michel Osta. Her father is a Lebanese immigrant from Zahle who left Lebanon and relocated to the US during Lebanon's Civil War.

She attended Sweetwater Elementary School in Port Orange, Florida and began playing the steel drums in fifth grade. Osta enjoyed the instrument so much, Tommy Reynolds of the 1970s band, Hamilton, Joe Frank and Reynolds made a set of oversized chrome low C lead (Tenor) steel drums for her. Osta soon took her steel drums around Daytona Beach and became known as the city's 10-year-old street performer.

Her many appearances led to professional events and appearances including, The Daytona Beach Bandshell, a historic amphitheater located on Ocean Avenue in Daytona Beach, Florida. This chain of events led to a radio station manager suggesting she have her own show then she began "Pavlina's Kidz Place."

For 15 minutes every Saturday, Pavlina would interview local newsmakers. Her first celebrity interview on "Pavlina's Kidz Place" was with NBA professional basketball player Vince Carter. Pavlina's Kidz Place interfered with Osta's dance class in Orlando, so she took the show on location in Orlando in order to keep the radio show and her ballet classes.

Osta posed as a fan and snagged an interview with Kevin Jonas, the presenter for the American Music Festival in 2010 where she boldly asked the man standing next to Jonas to film the interview who was Jonas' manager, Johnny Wright.

Most of Osta's school years were a Hannah Montana lifestyle interviewing celebrities after school on location, editing the show, scheduling guests and studying. By the age of 18, Osta signed for Salem Media holding and moved to Manhattan and completed her last year of high school online and earned a diploma through the IB program. She attended Spruce Creek High School.

Osta attended The King's College from 2016 to 2019 and graduated with a BA in Media, Culture and The Arts.

While at The King's College she worked full-time, being a guest on various media platforms, and starting her own show on BOLD TV in New York. Osta commented from a BOLD TV interview when asked about living her dreams at a young age, Osta said it's a struggle but quoted from Willy Wonka, "eye on the prize."

== Career ==
As early as 2009 by the age of 11, Osta began her syndicated broadcast, Pavlina's Kidz Place, where her guests included celebrities ranging from athletes and music artists to actors and politicians. The shows also aired on 17 radio stations including WAPN (91.5FM) in Holly Hill, Florida and WELE (1380AM) in Ormond Beach, Florida from 2009 to 2016.

In 2013, Pavlina founded Text Ya Later, a non-profit intended to raise youth awareness about the dangers of distracted driving. In 2014, she published Talk to Me: The Road Trips of a Teen Celebrity Radio Host a non-fiction Exposé compiling some of her most sought-after interviews.

In 2015, Osta moved to New York City where she spent 5 years at Salem Media holding the position of paid intern while finishing her senior year in high school and one year later, she was appointed executive director of National Podcasts.

Upon graduating from Kings College in 2019, Osta, who resided in New York City during the COVID epidemic as a required worker, spent her quarantine time getting her yoga teaching certificate. In 2020, Osta used this time to complete her book, 20 Things Every 20-Something Should Know. The book chronicles her interviews with doctors, researchers, and celebrities who give advice to Millennials and Generation Zs. The book is a roadmap for young adults wishing to succeed in today's world.

In 2022, Osta joined WLUC TV6 where she became co-anchor of the TV6 Early Evening News and co-anchor of the TV6 Evening News. Osta was additionally appointed anchor and producer for TV6's First Look in October 2022.

Throughout her career, Osta held several titles including, the Junior Editor for I Am Entertainment Magazine, a contributor for Full Access Magazine and Equanimity Magazine.

== Guinness World Record ==
On November 22–23, 2014 Osta achieved the Guinness World Record for the Most Live Radio Interviews in 24 Hours. She conducted 347 interviews, each being a unique set of at least five questions. The entire 24-hour period was broadcast live on Ustream.tv and via Live365.

== Publications ==
- 20 Things Every 20-Something Should Know (2020)
- Talk to Me: The Road Trips of a Teen Celebrity Radio Host (2014): An incredible story of an irrepressible teen chasing her dream of celebrity journalism.
- What It's Like to Be a Teen Reporter (2014)

== Awards and honors ==
- Gracie Award Winner, Outstanding Anchor - News or News Magazine, (2014)
- Gracie Award Winner, Outstanding Host - News/Non-Fiction, (2015)
- Gracie Award Winner, Outstanding Host - Entertainment/Information, (2016)
- Gracie Award Winner, Outstanding Talk Show - Entertainment/Information/News/Lifestyle, (2016)
- Gracie Award Winner, Host/Personality - News or News Magazine, (2017)
- TELLY Award Winner, TV Programs, Segments, or Promotional Pieces, (2015)
- Communicator Award, Online Video, (2015)
- Rising Star Award, (2015)
