= Turnersville, New Jersey =

Populated place in Gloucester County, New Jersey, US

- Census-designated place
- Map of Turnersville highlighted within Gloucester County. Right: Location of Gloucester County in New Jersey.

- Location in Gloucester County Location in New Jersey Location in the United States
- Coordinates: 39.766445°N 75.062003°W
- Country: United States
- State: New Jersey
- County: Gloucester
- Township: Washington
- Named after: Turner family

Area
  - Total: 1.51 sq mi (3.91 km^{2})
  - Land: 1.50 sq mi (3.89 km^{2})
  - Water: 0.0077 sq mi (0.02 km^{2}) 0.51%
- Elevation: 92 ft (28 m)

Population (2020)
  - Total: 3,594
  - Density: 2,390.1/sq mi (922.83/km^{2})
- Time zone: UTC−05:00 (Eastern (EST))
  - Summer (DST): UTC−04:00 (Eastern (EDT))
- ZIP Code: 08012 - Blackwood
- Area code: 856
- FIPS code: 34-74270
- GNIS feature ID: 02390410

Turnersville is an unincorporated community and census-designated place (CDP) located within Washington Township, in Gloucester County, in the U.S. state of New Jersey. As of the 2020 census, Turnersville had a population of 3,594.

The community was named for the Turner family, one of the original families of Washington Township. The area falls under the 08012 ZIP Code for Blackwood.

== Geography ==
According to the United States Census Bureau, Turnersville had a total area of 1.495 square miles (3.87 km^{2}), including 1.487 square miles (3.85 km^{2}) of land and 0.008 square miles (0.021 km^{2}) of water (0.51%). It is located on the South Branch Big Timber Creek. New Jersey Route 42 forms its eastern boundary and interchanges with the western terminus of the Atlantic City Expressway there. The CDP has a humid subtropical climate (Cfa) and average monthly temperatures range from 33.2 °F (0.7 °C) in January to 77.1 °F (25.1 °C) in July. The local hardiness zone is 7a.

== Demographics ==
Historical population
Census	Pop.	Note	%±
1990	3,843		—
2000	3,867		0.6%
2010	3,742		−3.2%
2020	3,594		−4.0%
Population sources: 1950 1960 1970; 1980 1990 2000; 2010

Turnersville first appeared as a census designated place in the 1990 U.S. census.

=== Racial and ethnic composition ===
Turnersville CDP, New Jersey – Racial and ethnic composition Note: the US Census treats Hispanic/Latino as an ethnic category. This table excludes Latinos from the racial categories and assigns them to a separate category. Hispanics/Latinos may be of any race.
Race / Ethnicity (NH = Non-Hispanic)	Pop 2000	Pop 2010	Pop 2020	% 2000	% 2010	% 2020
White alone (NH)	3,552	3,373	3,139	91.85%	90.14%	87.34%
Black or African American alone (NH)	142	132	131	3.67%	3.53%	3.64%
Native American or Alaska Native alone (NH)	1	3	6	0.03%	0.08%	0.17%
Asian alone (NH)	96	108	85	2.48%	2.89%	2.37%
Native Hawaiian or Pacific Islander alone (NH)	0	0	0	0.00%	0.00%	0.00%
Other race alone (NH)	1	1	4	0.03%	0.03%	0.11%
Mixed race or Multiracial (NH)	19	36	93	0.49%	0.96%	2.59%
Hispanic or Latino (any race)	56	89	136	1.45%	2.38%	3.78%
Total	3,867	3,742	3,594	100.00%	100.00%	100.00%

=== 2020 census ===
As of the 2020 census, Turnersville had a population of 3,594. The median age was 41.9 years. 23.0% of residents were under the age of 18 and 16.5% of residents were 65 years of age or older. For every 100 females there were 92.8 males, and for every 100 females age 18 and over there were 93.9 males age 18 and over.

100.0% of residents lived in urban areas, while 0.0% lived in rural areas.

There were 1,193 households in Turnersville, of which 36.3% had children under the age of 18 living in them. Of all households, 70.1% were married-couple households, 9.6% were households with a male householder and no spouse or partner present, and 15.7% were households with a female householder and no spouse or partner present. About 11.8% of all households were made up of individuals and 6.9% had someone living alone who was 65 years of age or older.

There were 1,229 housing units, of which 2.9% were vacant. The homeowner vacancy rate was 1.6% and the rental vacancy rate was 4.7%.

=== 2010 census ===
The 2010 United States census counted 3,742 people, 1,217 households, and 1,069 families in the CDP. The population density was 2,516.9 people per square mile (971.8 people/km^{2}). There were 1,237 housing units at an average density of 832.0 units per square mile (321.2 units/km^{2}). The racial makeup was 91.74% (3,433) White, 3.58% (134) Black or African American, 0.08% (3) Native American, 2.91% (109) Asian, 0.00% (0) Pacific Islander, 0.51% (19) from other races, and 1.18% (44) from two or more races. Hispanic or Latino of any race were 2.38% (89) of the population.

Of the 1,217 households, 38.9% had children under the age of 18; 74.8% were married couples living together; 9.6% had a female householder with no husband present and 12.2% were non-families. Of all households, 10.4% were made up of individuals and 4.1% had someone living alone who was 65 years of age or older. The average household size was 3.07 and the average family size was 3.30.

25.2% of the population were under the age of 18, 8.5% from 18 to 24, 21.3% from 25 to 44, 34.0% from 45 to 64, and 11.0% who were 65 years of age or older. The median age was 41.6 years. For every 100 females, the population had 93.8 males. For every 100 females ages 18 and older there were 93.2 males.

=== 2000 census ===
As of the 2000 United States census, there were 3,867 people, 1,167 households, and 1,060 families living in the CDP. The population density was 1,002.1 people/km^{2} (2,595 people/mi^{2}). There were 1,179 housing units at an average density of 305.5 units/km^{2} (791 units/mi^{2}). The racial makeup of the CDP was 92.68% White, 3.67% African American, 0.03% Native American, 2.48% Asian, 0.03% Pacific Islander, 0.39% from other races, and 0.72% from two or more races. Hispanic or Latino of any race were 1.45% of the population.

There were 1,167 households, out of which 49.4% had children under the age of 18 living with them, 81.3% were married couples living together, 7.5% had a female householder with no husband present, and 9.1% were non-families. 7.0% of all households were made up of individuals, and 3.6% had someone living alone who was 65 years of age or older. The average household size was 3.31 and the average family size was 3.49.

In the CDP the population was spread out, with 29.8% under the age of 18, 7.9% from 18 to 24, 27.0% from 25 to 44, 27.5% from 45 to 64, and 7.8% who were 65 years of age or older. The median age was 37 years. For every 100 females, there were 93.5 males. For every 100 females aged 18 and over, there were 89.7 males.

The median income for a household in the CDP was $86,421, and the median income for a family was $90,863. Males had a median income of $59,911 versus $43,929 for females. The per capita income for the CDP was $28,734. About 2.2% of families and 3.1% of the population were below the poverty line, including 2.7% of those under age 18 and none of those age 65 or over.

== Notable people ==
People who were born in, residents of, or otherwise closely associated with Turnersville include:

- Linda Fiorentino (born 1958), actress.
- Mike Rossman (born 1955), boxer, WBA light-heavyweight champion.
- Jamal Whitehead (born 1979), lawyer who is a United States district judge of the United States District Court for the Western District of Washington.
