= Washington Township, Gloucester County, New Jersey =

Township in Gloucester County, New Jersey, US

Washington Township, New Jersey
- Township
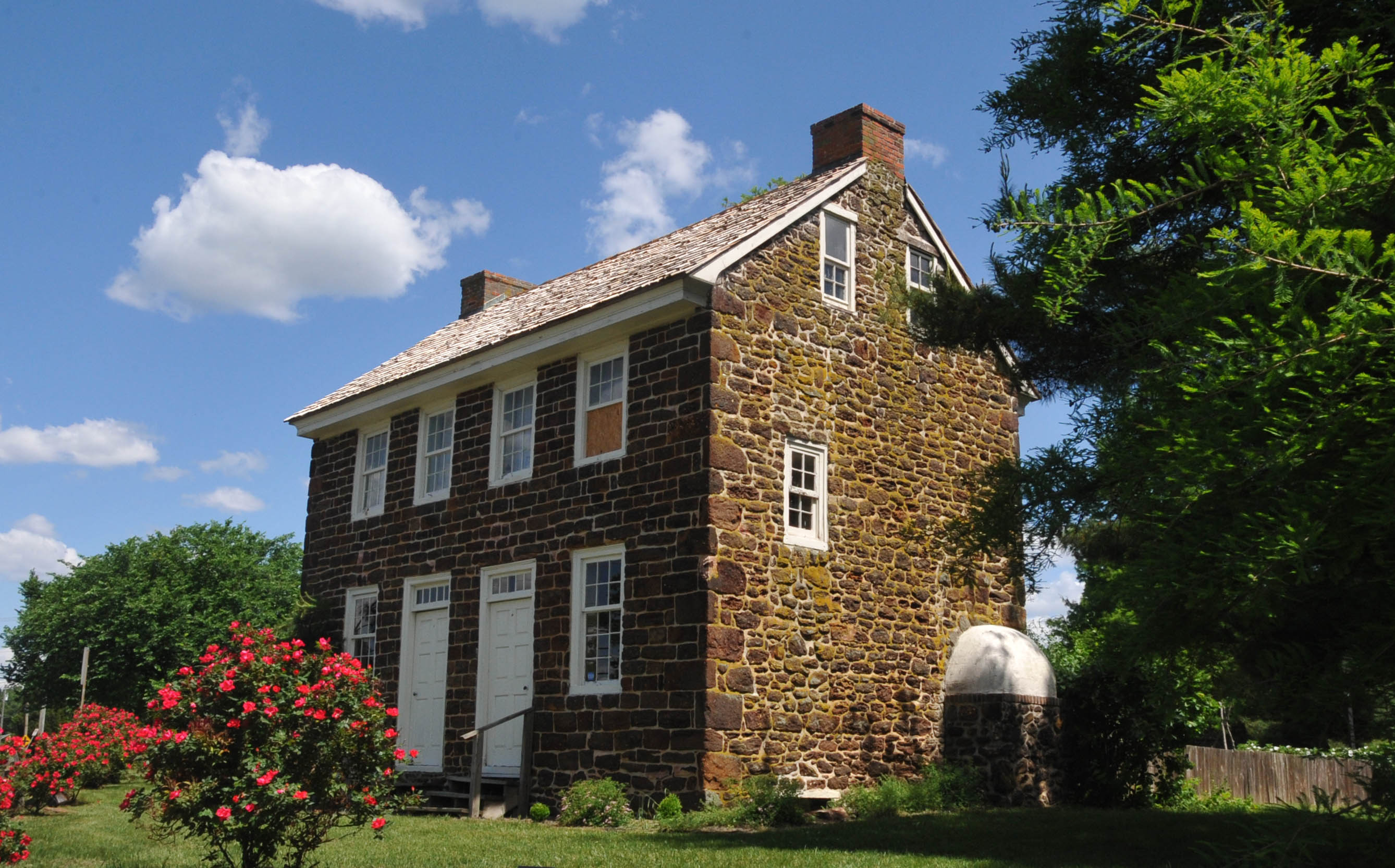
- George Jr. and Sarah Morgan House, listed on the NRHP

- Seal

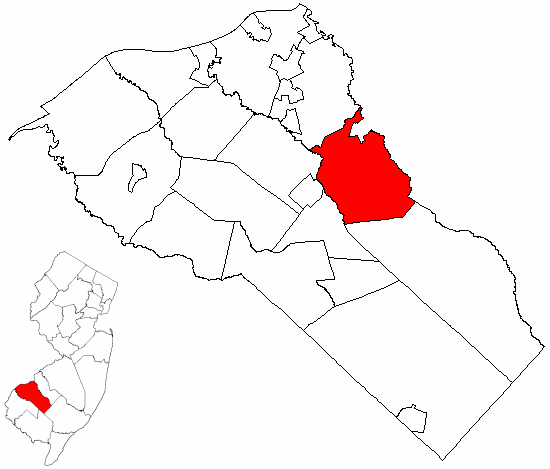
- Location of Washington Township in Gloucester County, New Jersey. Inset: Location of Gloucester County in New Jersey.

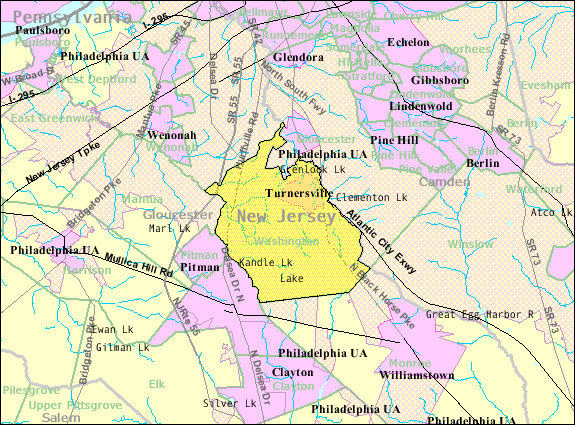
- Census Bureau map of Washington Township, Gloucester County, New Jersey

- Location in Gloucester County Location in New Jersey Location in the United States
- Coordinates: 39.748424°N 75.069092°W
- Country: United States
- State: New Jersey
- County: Gloucester
- Incorporated: February 17, 1836
- Named for: George Washington

Government
  - Type: Faulkner Act (mayor–council)
  - Body: Township Council
  - Mayor: Anthony DellaPia (R, term ends December 31, 2028)
  - Business Administrator: Joseph Russo
  - Municipal clerk: Christine Ciallella

Area
  - Total: 21.55 sq mi (55.81 km^{2})
  - Land: 21.34 sq mi (55.28 km^{2})
  - Water: 0.20 sq mi (0.53 km^{2}) 0.95%
  - Rank: 130th of 565 in state 4th of 24 in county
- Elevation: 115 ft (35 m)

Population (2020)
  - Total: 48,677
  - Estimate (2023): 49,378
  - Rank: 40th of 565 in state 1st of 24 in county
  - Density: 2,280.4/sq mi (880.5/km^{2})
  - Rank: 274th of 565 in state 10th of 24 in county
- Time zone: UTC−05:00 (Eastern (EST))
  - Summer (DST): UTC−05:00 (Eastern (EDT))
- ZIP Codes: Blackwood – 08012; Glassboro – 08028; Grenloch – 08032; Pitman – 08071; Sicklerville – 08081; Sewell – 08080
- Area code: 856
- FIPS code: 3401577180
- GNIS feature ID: 0882140
- Website: www.twp.washington.nj.us

Washington Township is a township in Gloucester County, in the U.S. state of New Jersey. As of the 2020 United States census, the township's population was 48,677, an increase of 118 (+0.2%) from the 2010 census count of 48,559, which in turn reflected an increase of 1,445 (+3.1%) from the 47,114 counted in the 2000 census. For 2023, the Census Bureau's Population Estimates Program calculated a population of 49,378.

Washington Township was incorporated by an act of the New Jersey Legislature on February 17, 1836, from portions of Deptford Township. The township officially moved to the newly created Camden County on March 13, 1844. Monroe Township was created on March 3, 1859, from part of the township. Most of Washington Township, along with all of Monroe Township, was moved back into Gloucester County on February 28, 1871, with the remaining portions of Washington Township that were still in Camden County being transferred to Gloucester Township. Additional transfers to Gloucester Township were made in 1926 and 1931. The township was named for George Washington, one of more than ten communities statewide named for the first president. It is one of five municipalities in the state of New Jersey that share the name Washington Township. Washington Borough is surrounded by Washington Township in Warren County.

The township is part of the Philadelphia metropolitan area, and the South Jersey region of the state. In 2008, CNN and Money magazine ranked Washington Township 58th on its list of the "100 Best Cities to Live in the United States".

== History ==
The oldest community in Washington Township, Grenloch Terrace, was a thriving Lenape Native American settlement called Tetamekon. Some of the early settlers to the area were the Collins family of Chestnut Ridge Farm, for whom Chestnut Ridge Middle School is named; the Turner family, for whom Turnersville was named; the Hurff family, for whom Hurffville and Hurffville Elementary School are named; the Heritage family, whose family began the Heritage's Dairy Farm Stores, and for whom the community Heritage Valley is named; the Morgan family, who were the first residents of the Olde Stone House, a landmark for residents of the township; and the Bell Family, who arrived in 1899 and for whom Bells Lake Park and Bells Elementary School are named. Sewell is named after General William Joyce Sewell, who was elected to the United States Senate in 1881 and 1895, and served as president of the New Jersey Senate in 1876, 1879 and 1880.

== Geography ==
According to the U.S. Census Bureau, the township had a total area of 21.55 square miles (55.81 km^{2}), including 21.35 square miles (55.28 km^{2}) of land and 0.20 square miles (0.53 km^{2}) of water (0.95%).

Turnersville (with a 2020 census population of 3,594), Grenloch (863) and Sewell (3,346) are an unincorporated communities and census-designated places (CDP) located entirely or partially within Washington Township.

Other unincorporated communities, localities, and places located partially or completely in the township include Bells Lake, Cressville, Dilkesboro, Fairview, Green Tree, Grenloch Terrace, Hurffville, Mount Pleasant, and Prossers Mill.

The township borders the municipalities of Deptford Township, Glassboro, Mantua Township, Monroe Township, Pitman in Gloucester County; and Gloucester Township in Camden County.

== Demographics ==
Historical population
Census	Pop.	Note	%±
1840	1,545		—
1850	2,114		36.8%
1860	1,307	*	−38.2%
1870	1,567		19.9%
1880	1,366		−12.8%
1890	1,155		−15.4%
1900	1,252		8.4%
1910	1,396		11.5%
1920	1,460		4.6%
1930	2,068		41.6%
1940	2,048		−1.0%
1950	2,496		21.9%
1960	4,923		97.2%
1970	15,741		219.7%
1980	27,878		77.1%
1990	41,960		50.5%
2000	47,114		12.3%
2010	48,559		3.1%
2020	48,677		0.2%
2023 (est.)	49,378		1.4%
Population sources: 1840 and 1880–2000 1850–1870; 1840–1920 1840 1850–1870; 1850 1870 1880–1890; 1890–1910 1910–1930; 1940–2000 2000; 2010 2020 * = Lost territory in previous decade.

=== 2010 census ===
The 2010 United States census counted 48,559 people, 17,287 households, and 13,328 families in the township. The population density was 2,271.0 per square mile (876.8/km^{2}). There were 17,810 housing units at an average density of 833.0 per square mile (321.6/km^{2}). The racial makeup was 87.70% (42,588) White, 5.82% (2,825) Black or African American, 0.11% (52) Native American, 3.78% (1,836) Asian, 0.02% (9) Pacific Islander, 0.85% (415) from other races, and 1.72% (834) from two or more races. Hispanic or Latino of any race were 3.65% (1,774) of the population.

Of the 17,287 households, 34.3% had children under the age of 18; 61.4% were married couples living together; 11.6% had a female householder with no husband present and 22.9% were non-families. Of all households, 19.3% were made up of individuals and 8.3% had someone living alone who was 65 years of age or older. The average household size was 2.80 and the average family size was 3.23.

24.0% of the population were under the age of 18, 9.1% from 18 to 24, 23.5% from 25 to 44, 31.0% from 45 to 64, and 12.5% who were 65 years of age or older. The median age was 40.6 years. For every 100 females, the population had 92.7 males. For every 100 females ages 18 and older there were 89.0 males.

The Census Bureau's 2006–2010 American Community Survey showed that (in 2010 inflation-adjusted dollars) median household income was $79,017 (with a margin of error of +/− $3,281) and the median family income was $94,585 (+/− $3,639). Males had a median income of $62,702 (+/− $2,103) versus $46,628 (+/− $2,959) for females. The per capita income for the borough was $33,038 (+/− $1,285). About 2.6% of families and 3.9% of the population were below the poverty line, including 5.3% of those under age 18 and 5.4% of those age 65 or over.

=== 2000 census ===
As of the 2000 census, there were 47,114 people, 15,609 households, and 12,658 families residing in the township. The population density was 2,204.6 inhabitants per square mile (851.2/km^{2}). There were 16,020 housing units at an average density of 749.6 per square mile (289.4/km^{2}). The racial makeup of the township was 90.20% White, 4.85% African American, 0.08% Native American, 3.31% Asian, 0.01% Pacific Islander, 0.53% from other races, and 1.01% from two or more races. Hispanic or Latino of any race were 2.03% of the population.

There were 15,609 households, out of which 43.8% had children under the age of 18 living with them, 68.3% were married couples living together, 9.8% had a female householder with no husband present, and 18.9% were non-families. 15.4% of all households were made up of individuals, and 5.8% had someone living alone who was 65 years of age or older. The average household size was 3.00 and the average family size was 3.38.

In the township, the population was spread out, with 28.7% under the age of 18, 8.0% from 18 to 24, 29.6% from 25 to 44, 24.7% from 45 to 64, and 9.0% who were 65 years of age or older. The median age was 36 years. For every 100 females, there were 94.0 males. For every 100 females ages 18 and over, there were 89.8 males.

The median income for a household in the township was $66,546, and the median income for a family was $74,661. Males had a median income of $51,319 versus $35,018 for females. The per capita income for the township was $25,705. About 2.5% of families and 3.2% of the population were below the poverty line, including 3.2% of those under age 18 and 4.5% of those age 65 or over.

== Government ==
=== Local government ===
Washington Township is governed under the Faulkner Act, formally known as the Optional Municipal Charter Law. by the Mayor-Council system of New Jersey municipal government (Plan 2), implemented based on direct petition as of January 1, 1985. The township is one of 71 municipalities (of the 564) statewide that use this form of government. The township's governing body comprises the Mayor and the five-member Township Council. The mayor is directly elected by township voters and is the chief executive in charge of the administrative functions of the town. Members of the township council are elected on an at-large basis in partisan elections held as part of the November general election. All elected officials serve four-year terms of office on a staggered basis, with the mayor and two council seats up for election in even-numbered years and the other three council seats up for vote two years later.

As of 2025, the mayor of Washington Township is Republican Anthony DellaPia, whose term of office expires December 31, 2028. Members of the township council are Council President Peter Del Borello III (R, 2026), Council Vice-President Donald C. Brown Jr. (R, 2026), Joseph J. Harris (R, 2028), Dana Pasqualone (R, 2028;appointed to serve an unexpired term) and Johnson "Jack" Yerkes III (R, 2026).

In June 2025, Richard Bennett resigned from his council seat expiring in December 2028, following his arrest for sending falsified and harassing documents to school board members. The seat is vacant pending the upcoming election. The next month, Dana Pasqualone was appointed to fill the vacancy and will serve on an interim basis until November 2025, when voters will select a candidate to serve the balance of the term of office.

=== Federal, state and county representation ===
Washington Township is located in the 1st Congressional District and is part of New Jersey's 4th state legislative district.

For the 119th United States Congress, New Jersey's 1st congressional district is represented by Donald Norcross (D, Camden). New Jersey is represented in the United States Senate by Democrats Cory Booker (Newark, term ends 2027) and Andy Kim (Moorestown, term ends 2031).

For the 2026–2027 session, the 4th legislative district of the New Jersey Legislature is represented in the State Senate by Paul D. Moriarty (D, Washington Township) and in the General Assembly by Dan Hutchison (D, Gloucester Township) and Cody Miller (D, Monroe Township).

Gloucester County is governed by a board of county commissioners, whose seven members are elected at-large to three-year terms of office on a staggered basis in partisan elections, with either two or three seats coming up for election each year. At a reorganization meeting held each January, the Board selects a Director and a Deputy Director from among its members. As of 2025, Gloucester County's Commissioners are:

Director Frank J. DiMarco (D, Deptford Township, 2025), Matt Weng (D, Pitman, 2026), Joann Gattinelli (D, Washington Township, 2026), Nicholas DeSilvio (R, Franklin Township, 2027), Denice DiCarlo (D, West Deptford Township, 2025) Deputy Director Jim Jefferson (D, Woodbury, 2026) and Christopher Konawel Jr. (R, Glassboro, 2027).

Gloucester County's constitutional officers are: Clerk James N. Hogan (D, Franklin Township; 2027), Sheriff Carmel Morina (D, Greenwich Township; 2027) and Surrogate Giuseppe "Joe" Chila (D, Woolwich Township; 2028).

=== Politics ===
United States presidential election results for Washington Township 2024 2020 2016 2012 2008 2004
Year	Republican		Democratic		Third party(ies)	
Year	No.	%	No.	%	No.	%
2024	15,674	54.46%	12,737	44.25%	371	1.29%
2020	15,906	52.08%	14,244	46.64%	392	1.28%
2016	13,076	52.35%	11,144	44.61%	759	3.04%
2012	12,169	49.69%	12,050	49.20%	273	1.11%
2008	12,570	49.00%	12,815	49.96%	268	1.04%
2004	12,805	51.12%	12,082	48.23%	163	0.65%

As of March 2011, there were a total of 33,934 registered voters in Washington, of which 11,872 (35.0%) were registered as Democrats, 7,763 (22.9%) were registered as Republicans and 14,279 (42.1%) were registered as Unaffiliated. There were 20 voters registered to other parties.

In the 2012 presidential election, Republican Mitt Romney received 49.7% of the vote (12,169 cast), ahead of Democrat Barack Obama with 49.2% (12,050 votes), and other candidates with 1.1% (273 votes), among the 24,648 ballots cast by the township's 35,305 registered voters (156 ballots were spoiled), for a turnout of 69.8%. In the 2008 presidential election, Democrat Barack Obama received 49.6% of the vote (12,815 cast), ahead of Republican John McCain with 48.6% (12,570 votes) and other candidates with 1.0% (268 votes), among the 25,859 ballots cast by the township's 35,224 registered voters, for a turnout of 73.4%. In the 2004 presidential election, Republican George W. Bush received 50.9% of the vote (12,805 ballots cast), outpolling Democrat John Kerry with 48.0% (12,082 votes) and other candidates with 0.5% (163 votes), among the 25,149 ballots cast by the township's 33,043 registered voters, for a turnout percentage of 76.1.

Gubernatorial election results for Washington Township
Year	Republican		Democratic		Third party(ies)	
Year	No.	%	No.	%	No.	%
2025	11,520	51.38%	10,769	48.03%	133	0.59%
2021	10,347	58.34%	7,303	41.18%	86	0.48%
2017	5,612	45.88%	6,368	52.06%	251	2.05%
2013	9,129	67.15%	4,294	31.59%	172	1.27%
2009	7,789	53.10%	5,757	39.25%	1,122	7.65%
2005	6,061	46.71%	6,523	50.27%	393	3.03%

In the 2013 gubernatorial election, Republican Chris Christie received 67.1% of the vote (9,129 cast), ahead of Democrat Barbara Buono with 31.6% (4,294 votes), and other candidates with 1.3% (172 votes), among the 13,803 ballots cast by the township's 34,580 registered voters (208 ballots were spoiled), for a turnout of 39.9%. In the 2009 gubernatorial election, Republican Chris Christie received 52.6% of the vote (7,789 ballots cast), ahead of Democrat Jon Corzine with 38.8% (5,757 votes), Independent Chris Daggett with 7.0% (1,043 votes) and other candidates with 0.5% (79 votes), among the 14,820 ballots cast by the township's 34,338 registered voters, yielding a 43.2% turnout.

United States Senate election results for Washington Township1
Year	Republican		Democratic		Third party(ies)	
Year	No.	%	No.	%	No.	%
2024	14,708	52.73%	12,926	46.34%	261	0.94%
2018	10,597	54.39%	8,252	42.36%	633	3.25%
2012	10,774	45.77%	12,311	52.30%	454	1.93%
2006	7,299	50.41%	6,905	47.69%	275	1.90%

United States Senate election results for Washington Township2
Year	Republican		Democratic		Third party(ies)	
Year	No.	%	No.	%	No.	%
2020	15,516	51.67%	13,974	46.53%	540	1.80%
2014	6,037	50.03%	5,827	48.29%	203	1.68%
2013	4,052	53.78%	3,391	45.00%	92	1.22%
2008	11,408	47.55%	12,143	50.62%	439	1.83%

== Education ==
Washington Township Public School District serves students in pre-kindergarten through twelfth grade. As of the 2023–24 school year, the district, comprised of 11 schools, had an enrollment of 7,302 students and 654.0 classroom teachers (on an FTE basis), for a student–teacher ratio of 11.2:1. Schools in the district (with 2023–24 enrollment data from the National Center for Education Statistics) are Grenloch Terrace Early Childhood Center with 999 students in pre-kindergarten, Bells Elementary School with 552 students in grades K–5, Birches Elementary School with 453 students in grades K–5, Hurffville Elementary School with 555 students in grades K–5, Thomas Jefferson Elementary School with 482 students in grades K–5, Wedgewood Elementary School with 473 students in grades K–5, Whitman Elementary School with 557 students in grades K–5, Bunker Hill Middle School with 575 students in grades 6–8, Chestnut Ridge Middle School with 656 students in grades 6–8, Orchard Valley Middle School with 526 students in grades 6–8 and Washington Township High School with 2,108 students in grades 9–12.

Students from across the county are eligible to apply to attend Gloucester County Institute of Technology, a four-year high school in Deptford Township that provides technical and vocational education. As a public school, students do not pay tuition to attend the school.

== Economy ==
Washington Township has two major economic centers. The town center is focused around the square formed by Greentree Road, Egg Harbor Road, Ganttown Road, and Hurffville-Crosskeys Road. Washington Township High School, the TD Bank Arts Centre, Washington Lake Park, and the township municipal building are located around this general vicinity. The other major center is located around Route 42, which connects Philadelphia to the Jersey Shore.

Washington Township is sometimes referred to as "South Jersey's Premier Community", "South Philly South", or "Little South Philly" since a large percentage of its citizens moved to the town from the largely Italian South Philadelphia region over the past several decades. It is also known simply as "Township".

== Recent expansion ==
Washington Township is largely the frontline between open space and home developers. A township that in the 1960s consisted of several isolated housing areas gravitating around the Wedgwood, Whitman Square, Birches, Birches West, and Hurffville neighborhoods has expanded outwards.

== Transportation ==
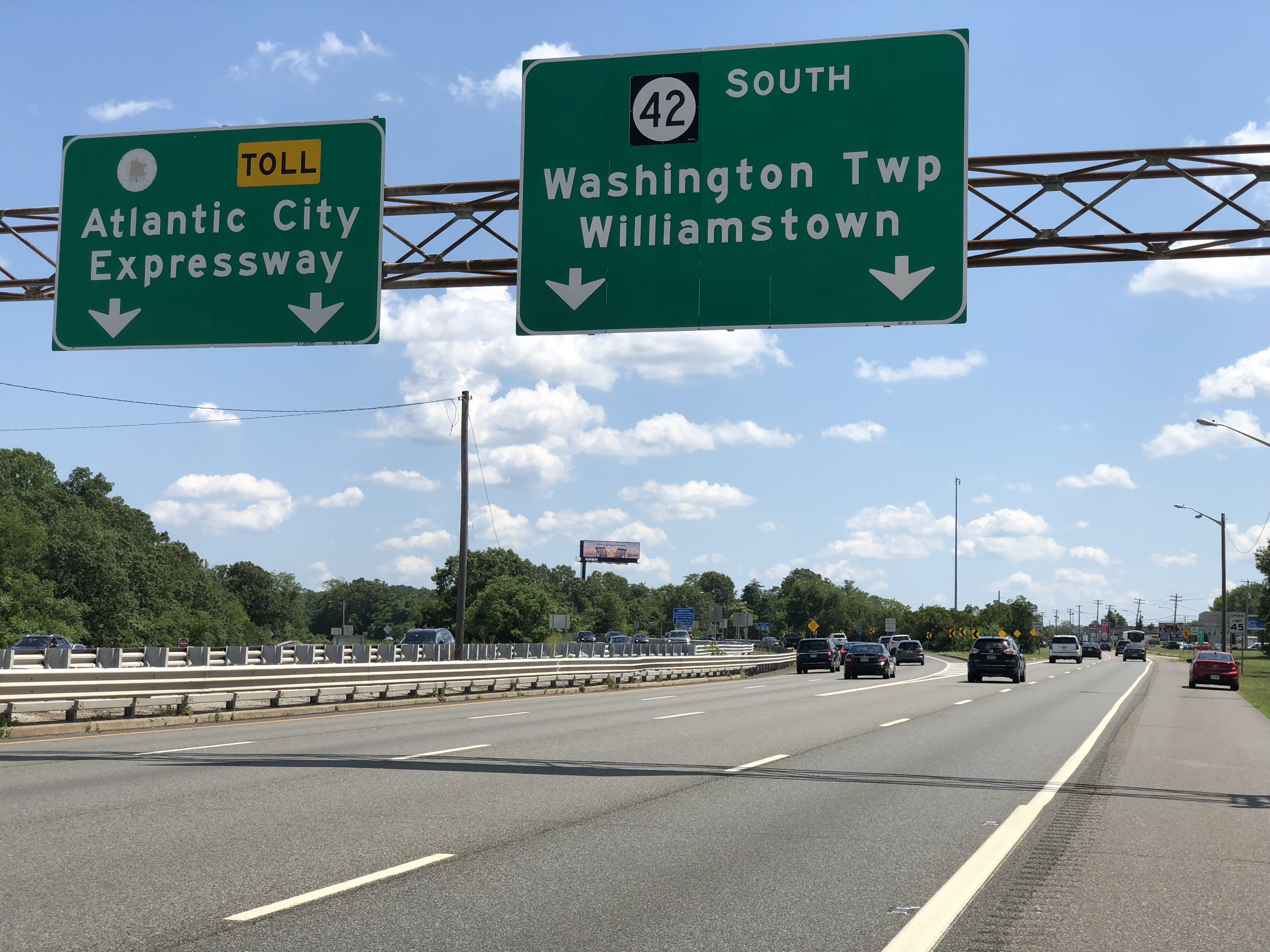
The junction of Route 42 and the Atlantic City Expressway in Washington Township

=== Roads and highways ===
As of May 2010, the township had a total of 199.78 miles (321.51 km) of roadways, of which 154.61 miles (248.82 km) were maintained by the municipality, 35.72 miles (57.49 km) by Gloucester County, 8.36 miles (13.45 km) by the New Jersey Department of Transportation and 1.09 miles (1.75 km) by the South Jersey Transportation Authority.

There are several major roadways that pass through Washington Township. Route 42 (Black Horse Pike) heads along the east side of the township, entering in the south from Monroe Township and continuing north for 4 miles (6.4 km) towards Gloucester Township in Camden County, where the road is known as the North-South Freeway. Route 168 (also known as Black Horse Pike) has its southern terminus at Route 42 in Washington Township and heads north along the township border towards Gloucester Township. Route 47 (Delsea Drive) runs along the western quarter of the township, entering in the south from Glassboro and proceeding north for 3.2 miles (5.1 km) towards Deptford Township. Route 55 clips the eastern tip of Gloucester Township, extending for 0.4 miles (0.64 km) from Mantua Township in the south to Deptford Township in the north. The Atlantic City Expressway enters from Gloucester Township, and zig-zags through both until its western terminus in Washington Township at Route 42.

County Route 534 (Good Intent Road) enters from Deptford Township on the east and heads into Gloucester Township. County Route 555 (Tuckahoe Road) enters from Monroe Township on the west and continues for 1.1 miles (1.8 km) to its terminus at Route 42.

=== Public transportation ===
NJ Transit's Atlantic City commuter rail line and PATCO Speedline rapid transit are accessible at the Lindenwold station, located 10 miles (16 km) northeast of the township.

NJ Transit bus service is available to Philadelphia on the 315, 400, 403, 408 and 412 routes, with local service on the 463 route.

== In popular culture ==
Musical groups from Washington Township include pop punk band I Call Fives and pop/hip hop group Kicking Sunrise.

== Notable people ==
People who were born in, residents of, or otherwise closely associated with Washington Township include:

- Stephen Altamuro (born 1960), politician who served in the New Jersey General Assembly from the 4th Legislative District from 2003 to 2004
- George Breen (1935–2019), competition swimmer who was a four-time Olympic medalist and former world record-holder in three events
- King Kong Bundy (born 1957), former WWF professional wrestler, stand-up comedian and actor
- Ryan D'Imperio (born 1987), fullback drafted by the Minnesota Vikings
- Tony DeAngelo (born 1995), professional ice hockey defenseman for the New York Rangers
- Sam Esmail (born 1977), producer, director, and screenwriter and creator of the television series Mr. Robot
- Linda Fiorentino (born 1958), actress
- Chris Gheysens (born 1971), president and chief executive officer of Wawa Inc.
- Emily Gray (born 2000), soccer player who plays as a midfielder for North Carolina Courage of the National Women's Soccer League
- Tara Lipinski (born 1982), 1998 Olympic Gold Medalist figure skater
- Gerald Luongo (born 1938), former mayor and one-term member of the New Jersey General Assembly
- Fred H. Madden (born 1954), serves in the New Jersey Senate, representing the 4th Legislative District
- Paul D. Moriarty (born 1956), former mayor of Washington Township who has served in the New Jersey General Assembly since 2006
- Cheryl Reeve (born 1966), head coach of Minnesota Lynx who is a two-time WNBA Coach of the Year
- Mike Rossman (born 1955), boxer, WBA light-heavyweight champion
- John Stevens (born 1966), former defenseman who has coached in the NHL at various levels
- Mark Tatulli (born 1963), syndicated comic strip cartoonist and children's book author
- Milt Thompson (born 1959), former MLB outfielder who played for the Philadelphia Phillies
- John E. Wallace Jr. (born 1942), former Associate Justice of the New Jersey Supreme Court who is the husband of former mayor Barbara Wallace
- Amy Wang (born 2002), table tennis player who competed at the 2024 Summer Olympics
- Jamal Whitehead (born 1979), lawyer who is a United States district judge of the United States District Court for the Western District of Washington
- John Yurkow, head coach of the Penn Quakers baseball team
