= 2000 Republican Party presidential primaries =

- January 24 to June 6, 2000

2,066 delegates (1,861 pledged and 205 unpledged) to the Republican National Convention 1,034 (majority) votes needed to win

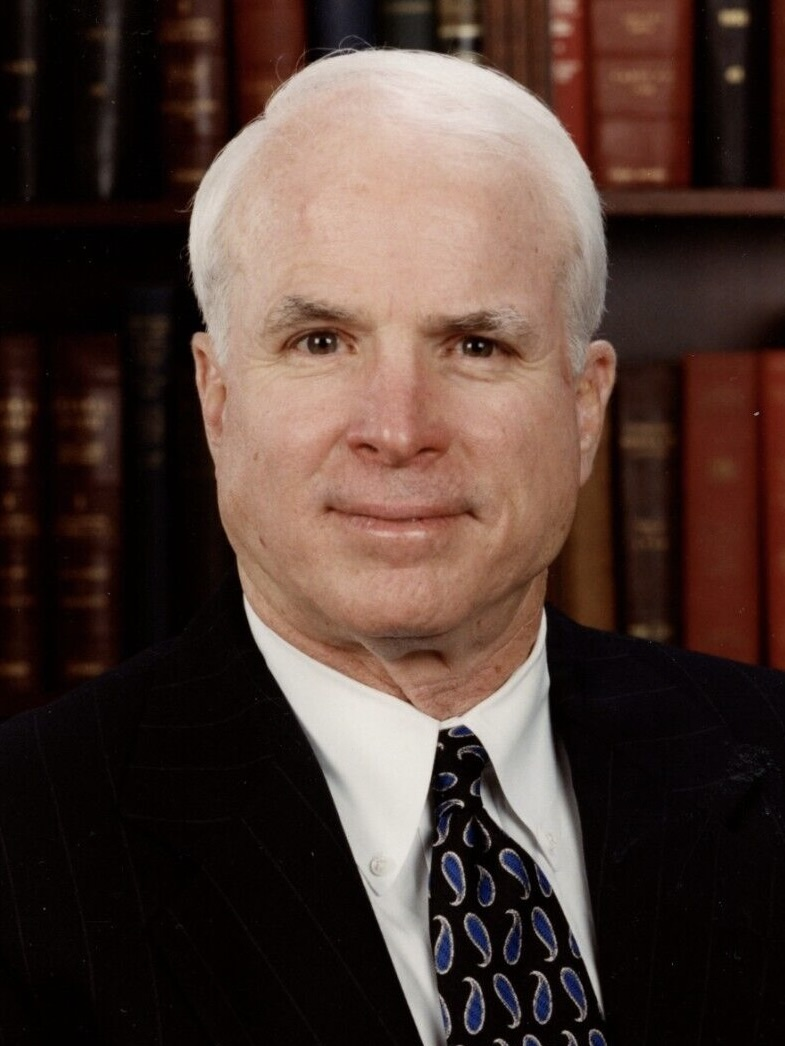

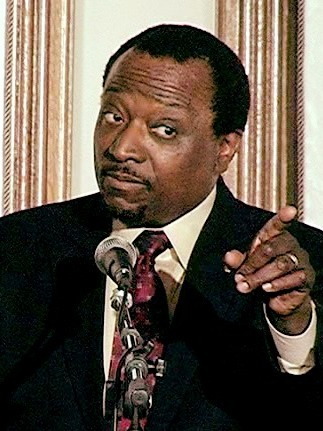
Candidate	George W. Bush	John McCain	Alan Keyes
Home state	Texas	Arizona	Maryland
Delegate count	1,496	244	22
Contests won	44	7	0
Popular vote	12,034,676	6,061,332	985,819
Percentage	62.0%	31.2%	5.1%
- First place finish by first-instance vote
Previous Republican nominee
Bob Dole
Republican nominee
George W. Bush

From January 24 to June 6, 2000, voters of the Republican Party chose its nominee for president in the 2000 United States presidential election. Texas governor George W. Bush was selected as the nominee through a series of primary elections and caucuses culminating in the 2000 Republican National Convention held from July 31 to August 3, 2000, in Philadelphia, Pennsylvania.

== Campaign ==
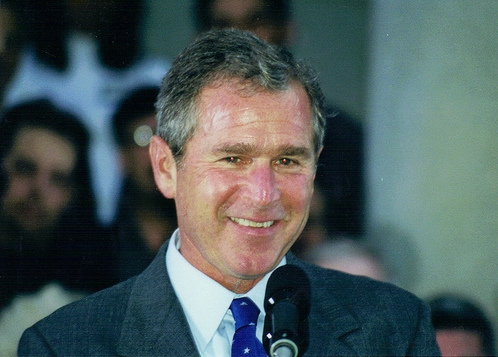
Bush in New Hampshire, after officially filing to run

The primary contest began with a fairly wide field, as the Republicans lacked an incumbent president or vice president. George W. Bush, Governor of Texas and son of George H. W. Bush, the most recent Republican president, took an early lead, with the support of much of the party establishment as well as a strong fund-raising effort. Former cabinet member George Shultz played an important early role in securing Republican support for Bush. In April 1998, he invited Bush to discuss policy issues with experts including Michael Boskin, John Taylor, and Condoleezza Rice. The group, which was "looking for a candidate for 2000 with good political instincts, someone they could work with," was impressed, and Shultz encouraged Bush to enter the race. Due in part to establishment backing, Bush dominated in early polling and fundraising figures. Despite stumbling in early primary debates, he easily won the Iowa caucuses, defeating his nearest opponent, Steve Forbes, by a margin of 41% to 31%.

Considered a dark horse, U.S. Senator John McCain of Arizona won 48% of the vote to Bush's 30% in the first-in-the-nation New Hampshire primary, giving his campaign a boost of energy and donations. Durham, New Hampshire was the site of an early debate between the Republican candidates.

Then, the main primary season came down to a race between Bush and McCain. McCain's campaign, centered on campaign finance reform, drew positive press coverage and a fair amount of public excitement, with polls giving the senator superior crossover support from independents and Democrats. With Vice President Gore easily locking up the Democratic nomination, many moderate and center-left voters felt compelled to make their voice heard in the still-contested Republican contest. Bush's campaign dealt with "compassionate conservatism," including a greater role for the federal government in education, subsidies for private charitable programs, and large reductions in income and capital gains taxes.

The next primary contest in South Carolina was notorious for its negative tone. Although the Bush campaign said it was not behind any attacks on McCain, locals supporting Bush reportedly handed out fliers and made telephone calls to prospective voters suggesting among other things, unsubstantiated claims that McCain was a "Manchurian candidate" and that he had fathered a child out of wedlock with a black New York-based prostitute (an incorrect reference to Bridget McCain, a child he and his wife had adopted from Bangladesh). Bush also drew fire for a speech made at Bob Jones University, a school that still banned interracial dating among its students. But the governor was seen to have the upper hand in a debate hosted by Larry King Live, and he won in South Carolina by nine points. McCain won primaries in Michigan, his home state of Arizona, and the remaining New England states except for Maine, but faced difficulty in appealing to conservative Republican primary voters. This was particularly true in Michigan, where despite winning the primary, McCain lost the GOP vote to Bush by a wide margin. McCain also competed in the Virginia primary, counting on continued crossover support by giving a speech calling out Pat Robertson and Jerry Falwell, both leaders of the Christian right, for intolerance. Bush won Virginia easily in spite of this campaign tactic. Bush's subsequent Super Tuesday victories in California, New York and the South made it nearly impossible, mathematically, for McCain to catch up, and he suspended his campaign the next day.

Other candidates included social conservative activist Gary Bauer, businessman Steve Forbes, Utah Senator Orrin Hatch, former ECOSOC Ambassador and Assistant Secretary of State for International Organization Affairs Alan Keyes, former Tennessee Governor Lamar Alexander, former Red Cross director and cabinet member Elizabeth Dole, Ohio Congressman John Kasich, and former Vice President Dan Quayle. Bauer and Hatch campaigned on a traditional Republican platform of opposition to legalized abortion and reductions in taxes. Keyes had a far more conservative platform, calling for the elimination of all federal taxes except tariffs. Keyes also called for returning to ban homosexuals in the military, while most GOP candidates supported the "don't ask, don't tell" policy. Keyes continued participating in the campaign for nearly all the primaries and continued to appear in the debates with frontrunners McCain and Bush. As in 1996, Forbes campaigned on making the federal income tax non-graduated, an idea he called the flat tax, although he increased his focus on social conservatives in 2000. Although Forbes (who won a few states' primary contests in the 1996 primaries) came a close second to Bush in the Iowa caucuses and even tied with him in the Alaska caucuses, he nor any of these other candidates won a primary.

== Candidates ==
=== Nominee ===
Candidate	Most recent office	Home state	Campaign Withdrawal date	Popular vote	Contests won	Running mate
George W. Bush	Governor of Texas (1995–2000)	Texas	(Campaign • Positions); Secured nomination: March 14, 2000	12,034,676 (62.00%)	44	Dick Cheney

=== Withdrew prior to convention ===
Candidate	Most recent office	Home state	Campaign Withdrawal date	Popular vote	Contests won
Alan Keyes	Former assistant U.S. secretary of state (1985–1987)	Maryland	(Campaign); Withdrew: July 25	985,819 (5.1%)	0

=== Withdrew during primaries ===
Candidate	Most recent office	Home state	Candidacy	Popular vote	Contests won	Date Campaign Suspended
John McCain	U.S. senator from Arizona (1987–2018)	Arizona	(Campaign)	6,061,332 (31.23%)	7 AZ, CT, MA, MI, NH, RI, VT	March 9, 2000
Steve Forbes	Publisher of Forbes magazine (1990–)	New Jersey	(Campaign)	171,860 (0.89%)	0	February 10, 2000
Gary Bauer	Former U.S. under secretary of Education (1985–1987)	Kentucky		<.05%	0	February 16, 2000
Orrin Hatch	U.S. senator from Utah (1977–2019)	Utah		<.05%	0	January 27, 2000

=== Withdrew before primary elections ===
Candidate	Most recent office	Home state	Candidacy	Date Campaign Suspended
Lamar Alexander	Former U.S. secretary of education and 1996 presidential candidate (1991–1993)	Tennessee		August 16, 1999
Pat Buchanan	Conservative commentator and 1992 and 1996 presidential candidate	Virginia		October 25, 1999 (to run for the Reform Party nomination)
Herman Cain	Businessman	Nebraska		
Elizabeth Dole	Former U.S. secretary of labor (1989–1990)	North Carolina		October 1999
John Kasich	U.S. representative from Ohio (1983–2001)	Ohio	(Campaign)	July 14, 1999
Dan Quayle	Former U.S. vice president (1989–1993)	Arizona	(Campaign)	September 28, 1999
Bob Smith	U.S. senator from New Hampshire (1990–2003)	New Hampshire		July 1999 (to run with a third party)

=== Declined to run ===
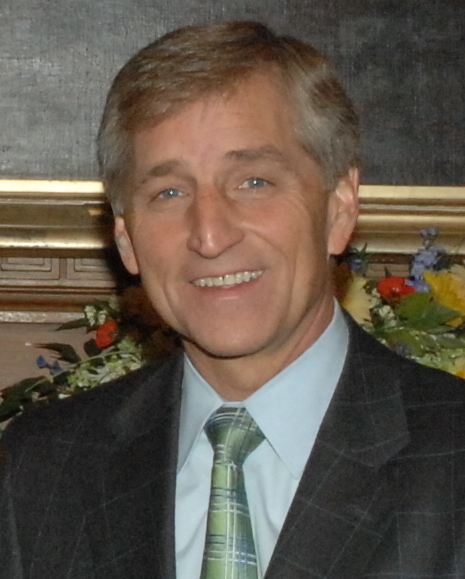
Marc Racicot, governor of Montana

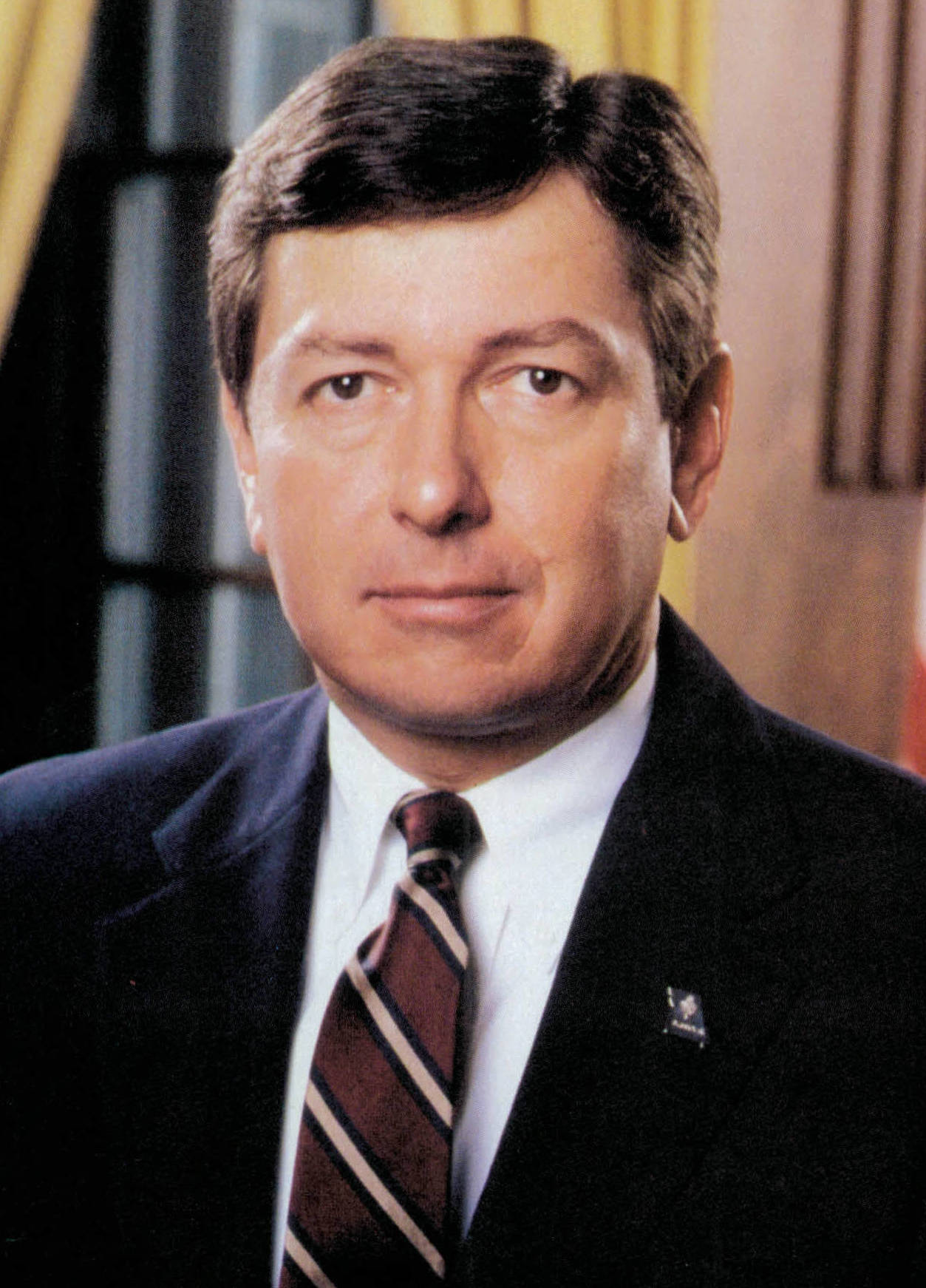
John Ashcroft, U.S. senator from Missouri (ran for re-election)

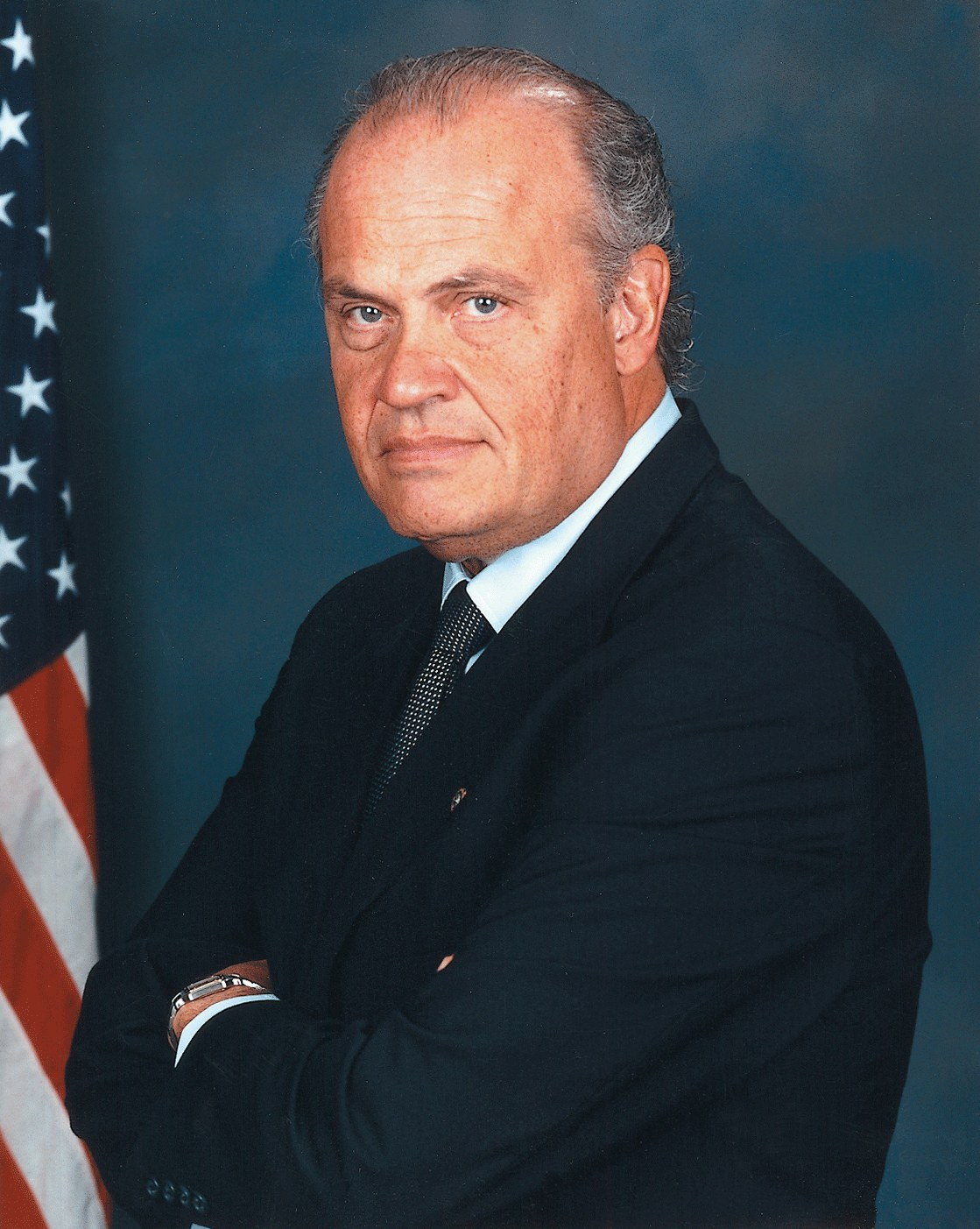
Fred Thompson, U.S. senator from Tennessee

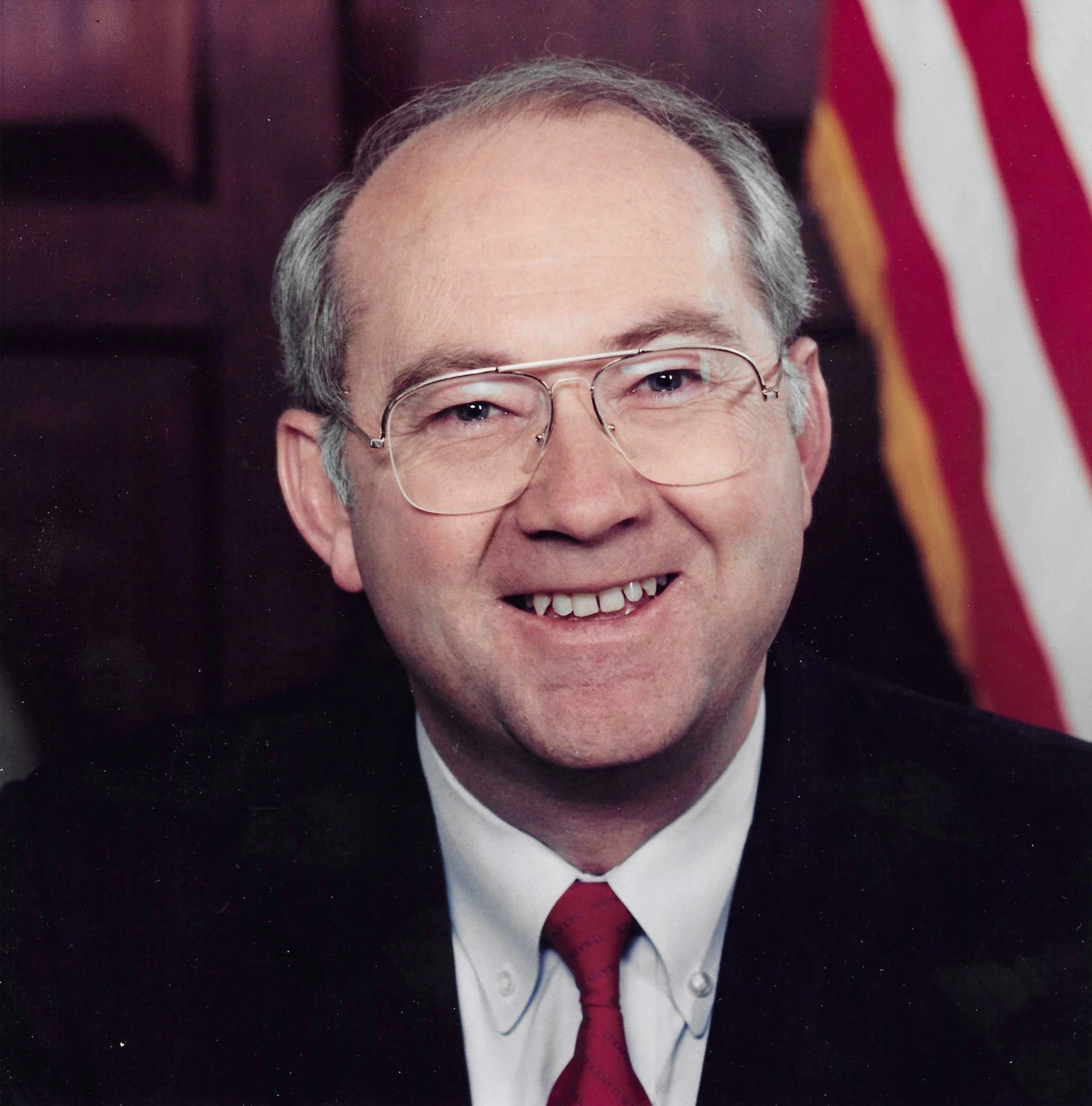
Phil Gramm, U.S. senator from Texas

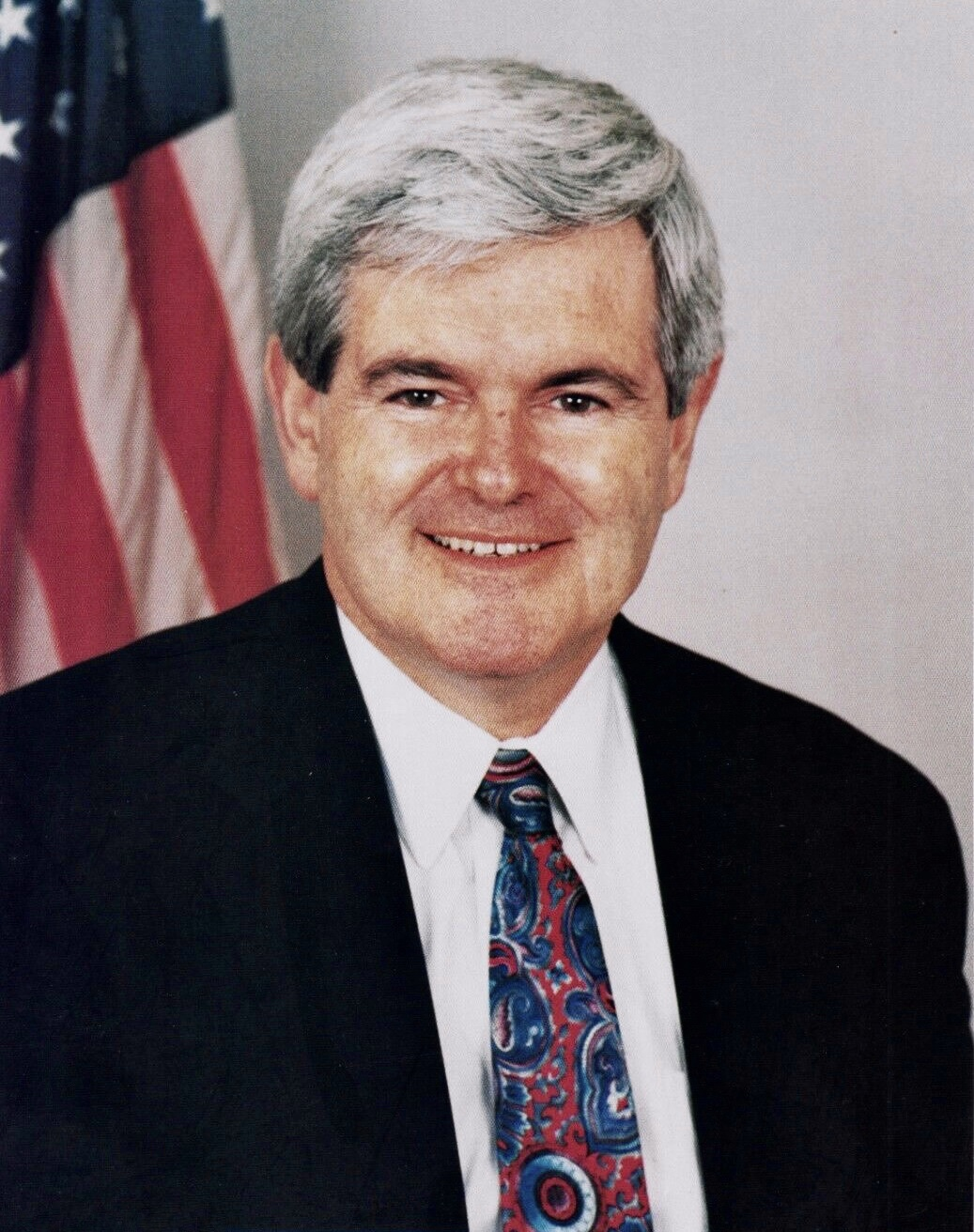
Newt Gingrich, former speaker of the House

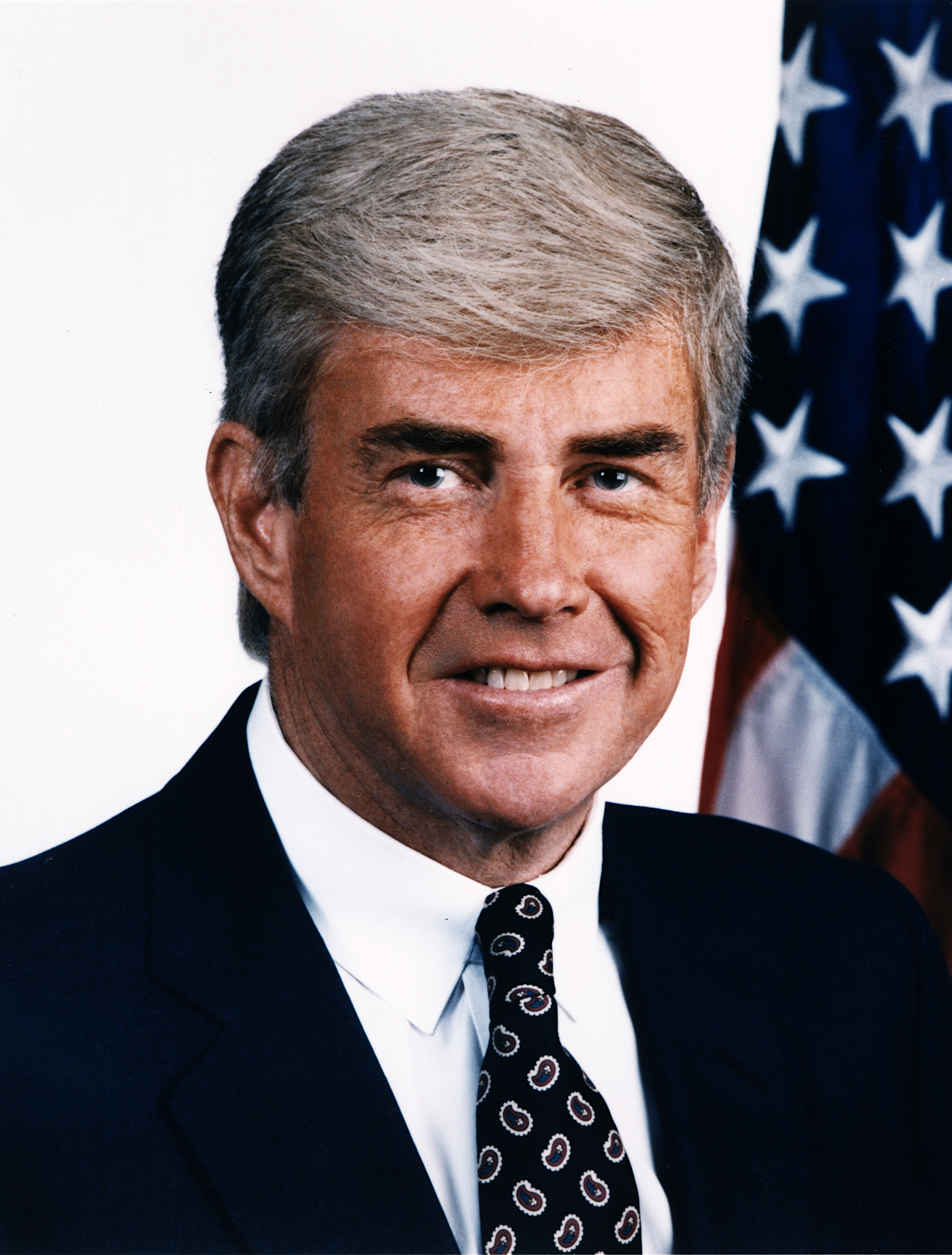
Jack Kemp, Former U.S. representative from New York and 1996 vice presidential nominee

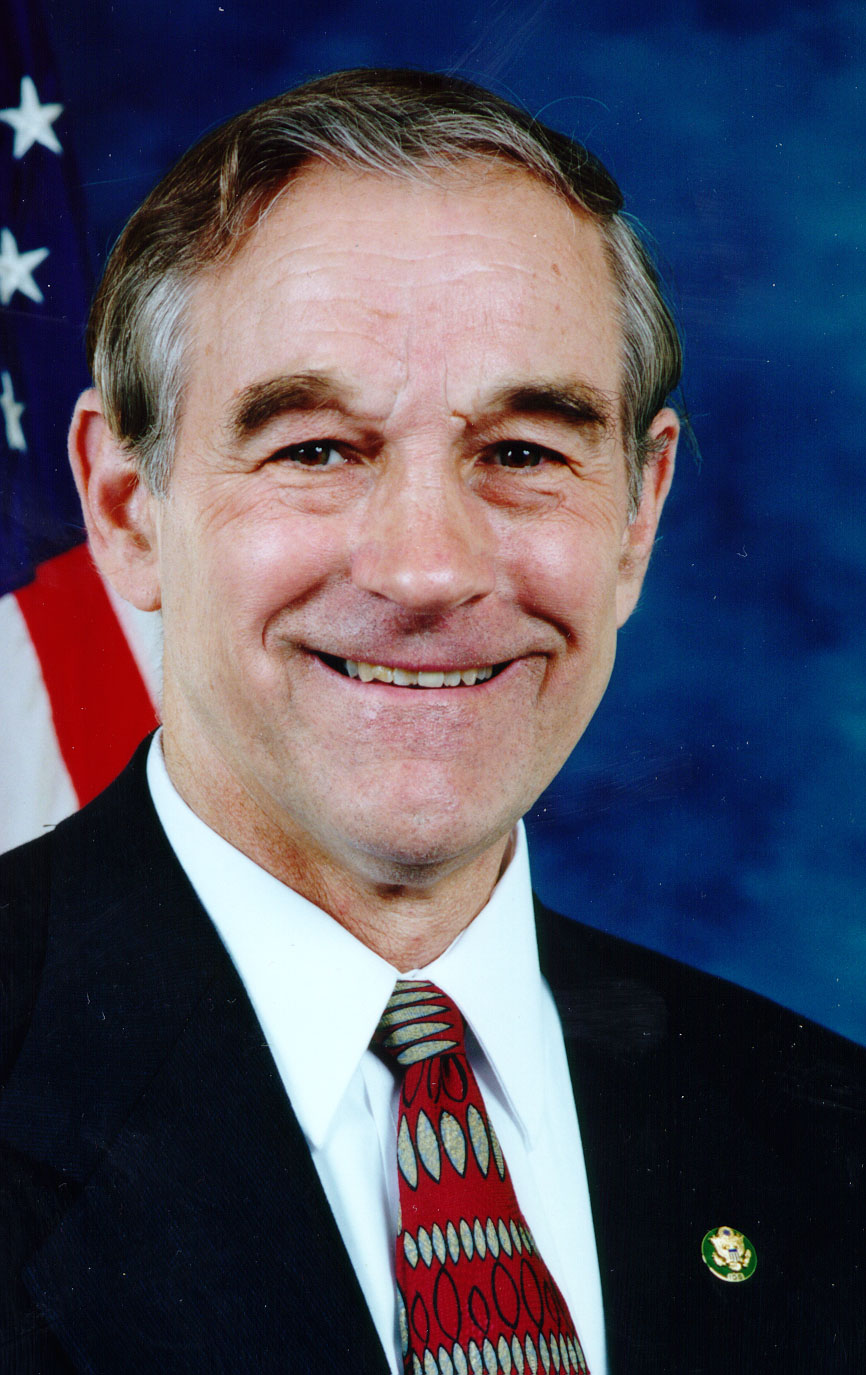
Ron Paul, U.S. representative from Texas (ran for re-election)

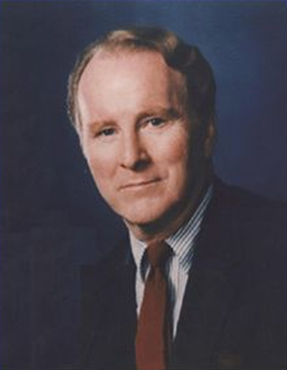
Bob Dornan, former U.S. representative from California

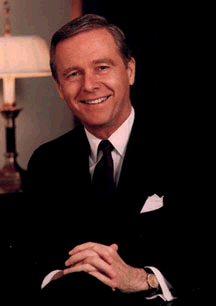
Pete Wilson, former governor of California

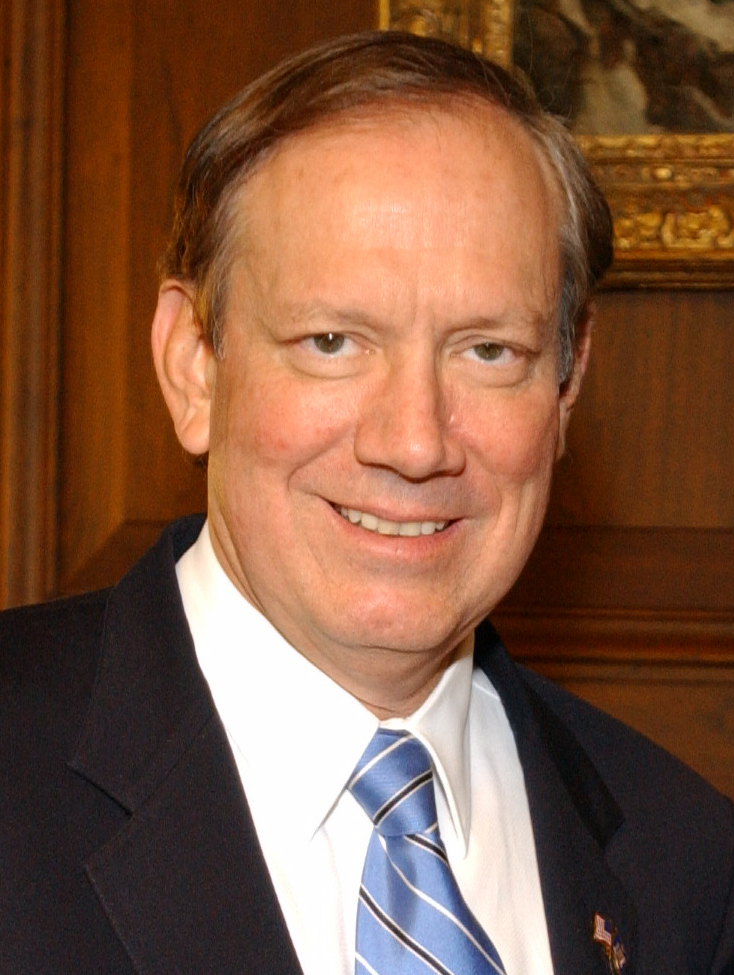
George Pataki, governor of New York

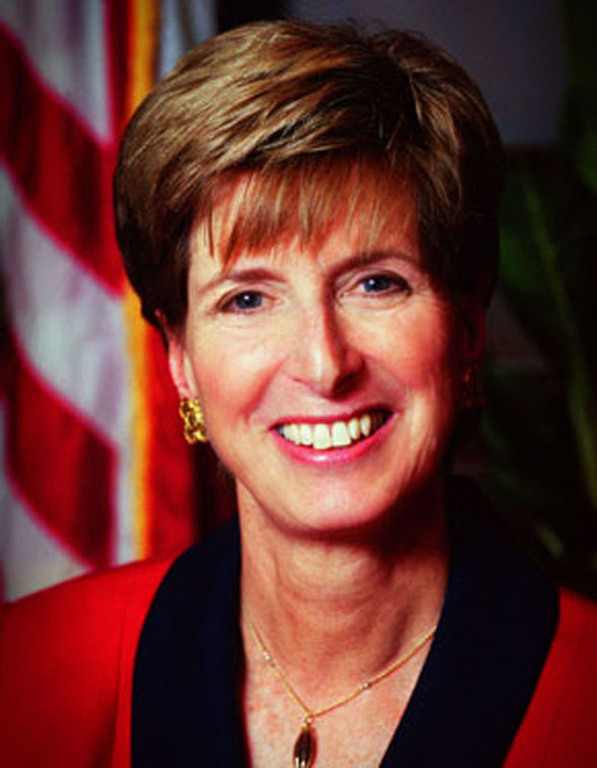
Christine Todd Whitman, governor of New Jersey

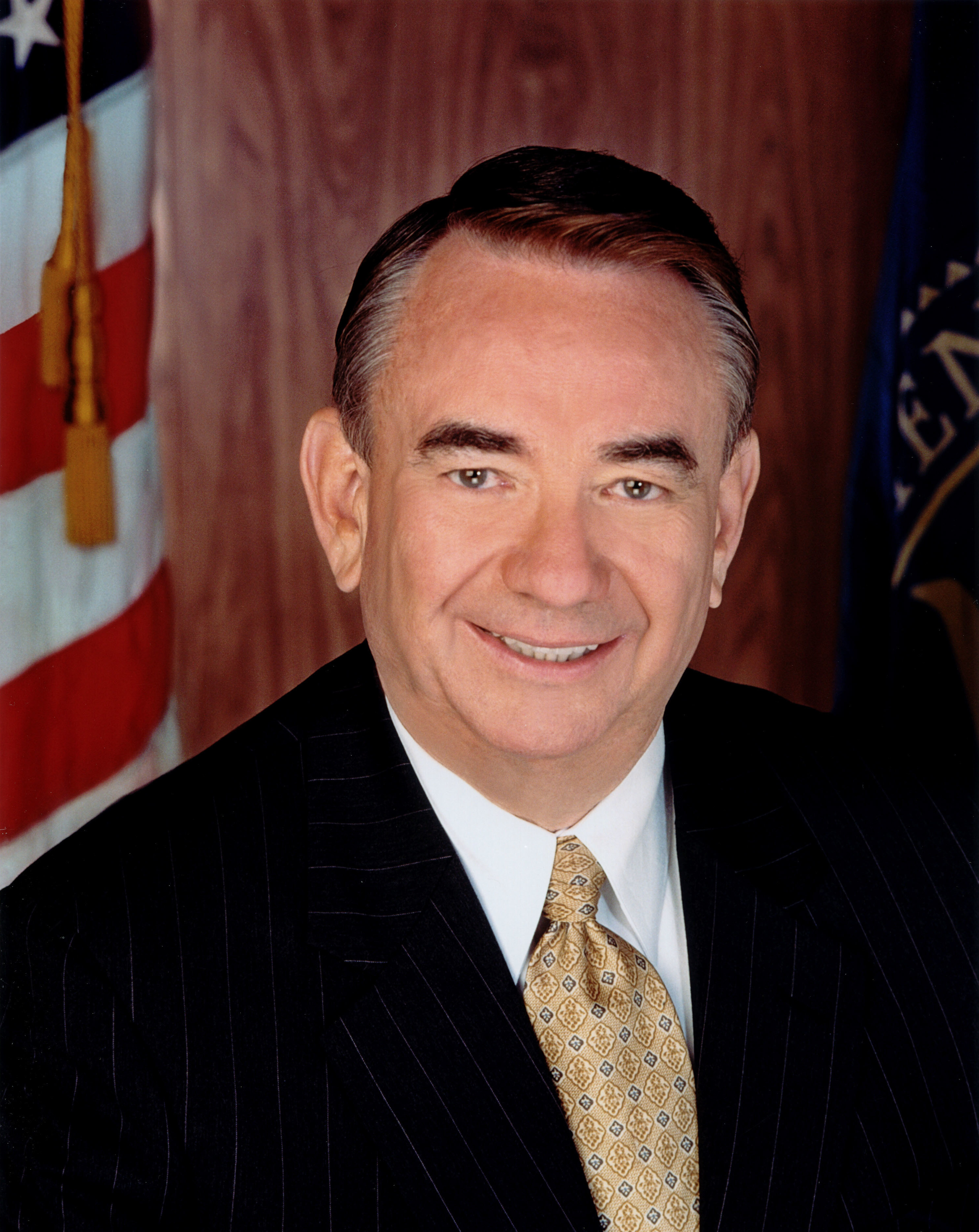
Tommy Thompson, governor of Wisconsin

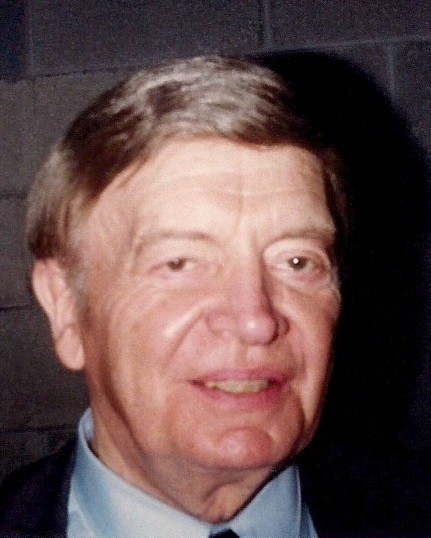
Harold Stassen, former governor of Minnesota

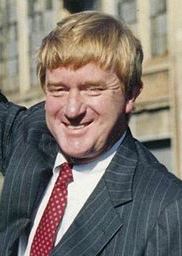
Bill Weld, former governor of Massachusetts

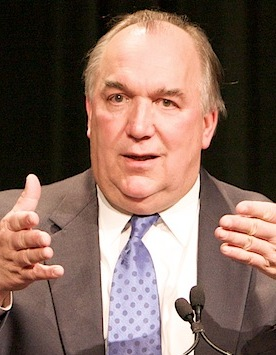
John Engler, governor of Michigan

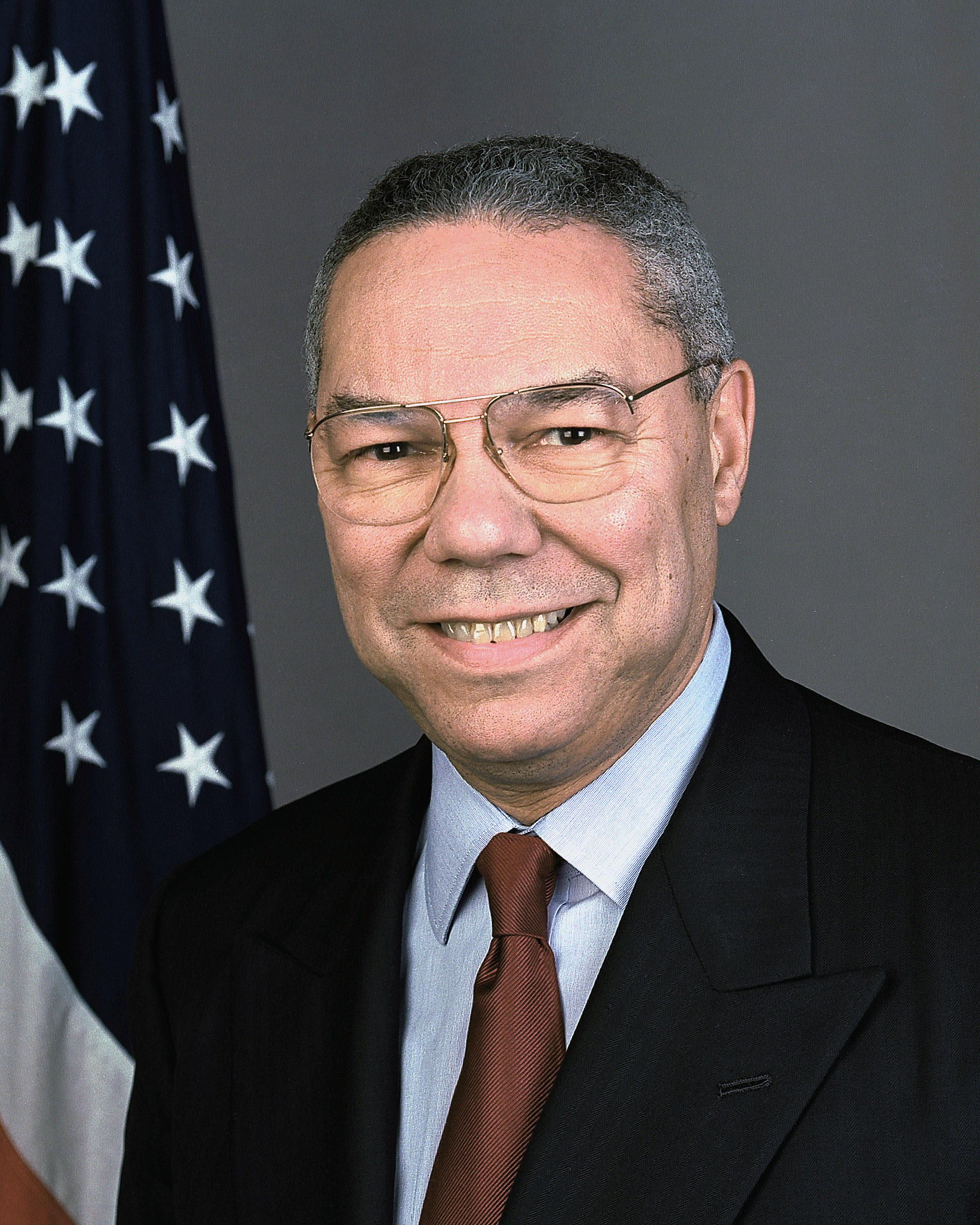
Colin Powell, former chairman of the Joint Chiefs of Staff

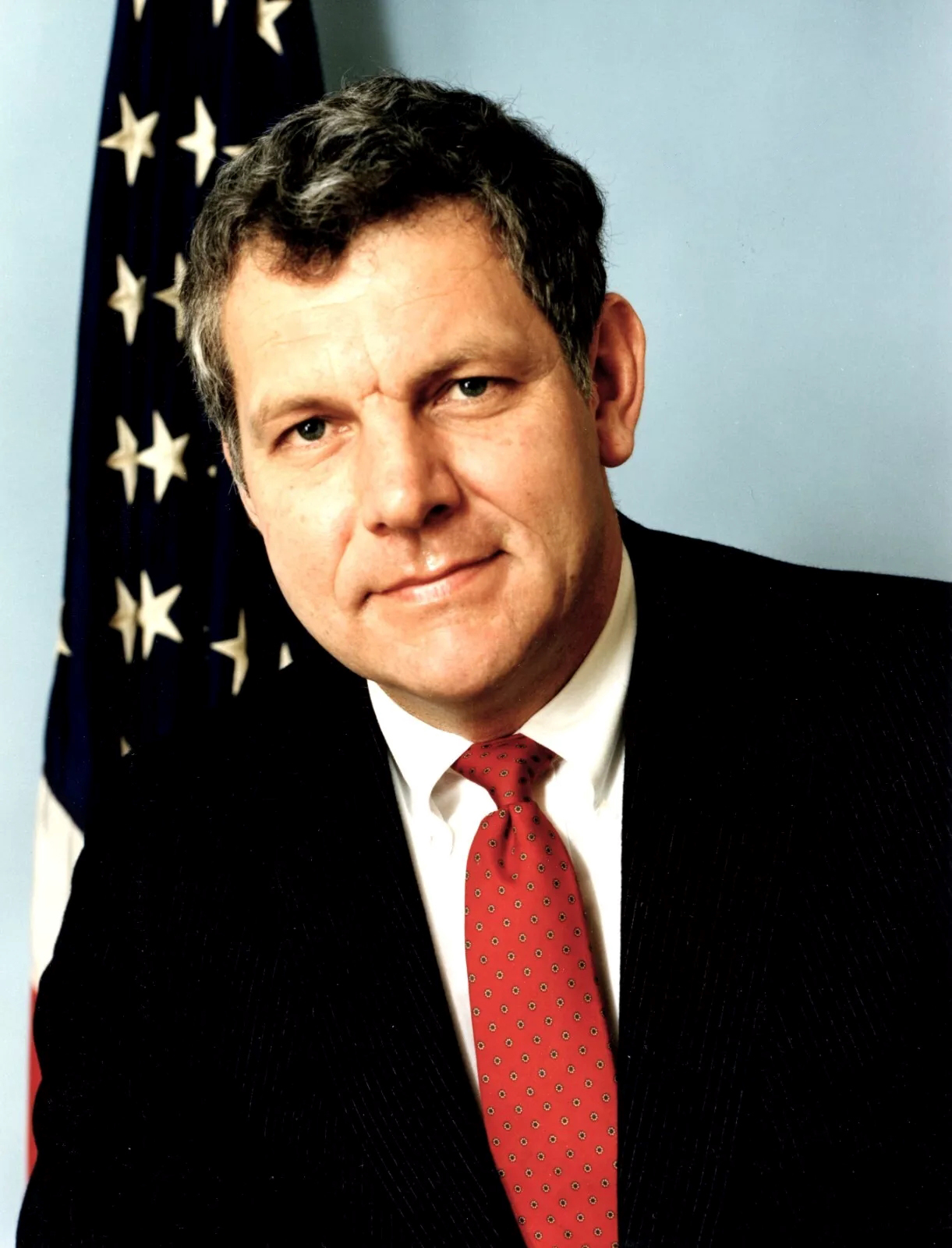
William Bennett, former U.S. secretary of education

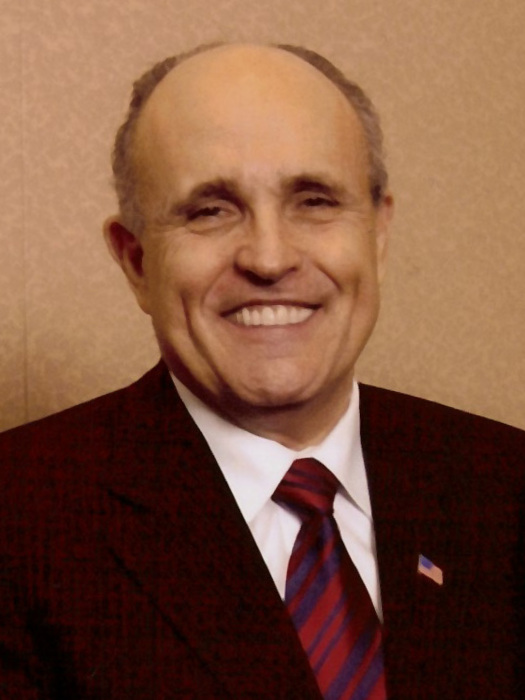
Rudy Giuliani, mayor of New York City (ran for U.S. Senate, but withdrew)

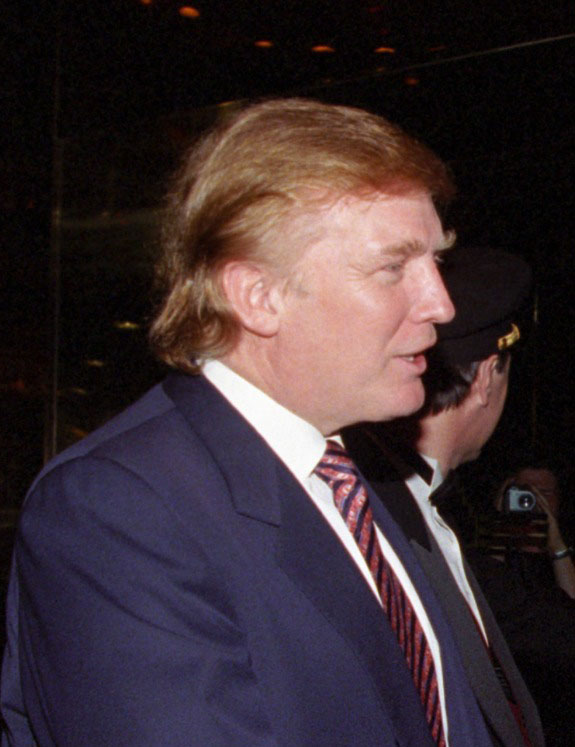
Donald Trump, businessman from New York

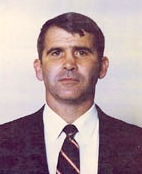
Oliver North, political commentator

== National polling ==
Source	Date	George W. Bush	John McCain	Steve Forbes	Elizabeth Dole	Dan Quayle	Pat Buchanan	Other
Gallup	Sep. 6–7, 1997	22%	–	9%	–	10%	5%	41% (Note: 15% for Jack Kemp, 9% for Christine Whitman, 5% each for Newt Gingrich and Fred Thompson, 3% each for John Ashcroft and Lamar Alexander, and 2% for Bob Smith.)
Gallup	May 8–10, 1998	30%	4%	7%	14%	9%	3%	19% (Note: 9% for Jack Kemp, 6% for Newt Gingrich, 2% for Lamar Alexander, and 1% each for Gary Bauer and John Kasich.)
Gallup	Oct. 23–25, 1998	39%	–	7%	17%	12%	–	16% (Note: 4% each for John Ashcroft, Newt Gingrich, John Kasich, and Lamar Alexander.)
Gallup	Jan. 8–10, 1999	42%	8%	5%	22%	6%	–	9% (Note: 4% for Lamar Alexander, 2% each for Gary Bauer and John Kasich and 1% for Bob Smith.)
Gallup	Mar. 12–14, 1999	52%	3%	1%	20%	9%	4%	7% (Note: 3% for John Kasich, 2% for Lamar Alexander, and 1% each for Gary Bauer and Bob Smith.)
Gallup	Apr. 13–14, 1999	53%	5%	6%	16%	7%	4%	4% (Note: 2% each for Gary Bauer and John Kasich.)
Gallup	Apr. 30 – May 2, 1999	42%	4%	6%	24%	6%	5%	7% (Note: 3% each for Lamar Alexander and Gary Bauer and 1% for John Kasich.)
Gallup	May 23–24, 1999	46%	6%	5%	18%	7%	6%	7% (Note: 2% each for Gary Bauer, John Kasich, and Bob Smith, and 1% for Lamar Alexander.)
Gallup	Jun. 4–5, 1999	46%	5%	5%	14%	9%	6%	6% (Note: 3% for Lamar Alexander and 1% each for Gary Bauer, John Kasich, and Bob Smith.)
Gallup	Jun. 25–27, 1999	59%	5%	6%	8%	6%	3%	10% (Note: 3% for John Kasich, 2% each for Gary Bauer, Lamar Alexander, and Orrin Hatch, and 1% for Bob Smith.)
Gallup	Aug. 16–18, 1999	61%	5%	4%	13%	6%	3%	4% (Note: 2% for Gary Bauer and 1% each for Orrin Hatch and Alan Keyes.)
Gallup	Sep. 10–14, 1999	62%	5%	5%	10%	5%	3%	5% (Note: 2% each for Gary Bauer and Orrin Hatch and 1% for Alan Keyes.)
Gallup	Oct. 8–10, 1999	60%	8%	4%	11%	–	3%	13% (Note: 5% for John Ashcroft, 3% each for Gary Bauer and Alan Keyes, and 2% for Orrin Hatch.)
Gallup	Oct. 21–24, 1999	68%	11%	8%	–	–	–	6% (Note: 3% for Orrin Hatch, 2% for Alan Keyes, and 1% for Gary Bauer)
Gallup	Nov. 4–7, 1999	68%	12%	6%	–	–	–	6% (Note: 2% each for Gary Bauer, Orrin Hatch, and Alan Keyes.)
Gallup	Nov. 18–21, 1999	63%	16%	6%	–	–	–	9% (Note: 4% for Orrin Hatch, 3% for Gary Bauer, and 2% for Alan Keyes.)
Gallup	Dec. 9–12, 1999	64%	18%	7%	–	–	–	8% (Note: 4% for Alan Keyes and 2% each for Gary Bauer and Orrin Hatch.)
Gallup	Dec. 20–21, 1999	60%	17%	9%	–	–	–	7% (Note: 4% for Alan Keyes, 2% for Gary Bauer, and 1% for Orrin Hatch.)
Gallup	Jan. 7–10, 2000	63%	18%	5%	–	–	–	5% (Note: 2% each for Orrin Hatch and Alan Keyes and 1% for Gary Bauer.)
Gallup	Jan. 13–16, 2000	61%	22%	5%	–	–	–	6% (Note: 3% for Alan Keyes, 2% for Gary Bauer, and 1% for Orrin Hatch.)
Gallup	Jan. 17–19, 2000	63%	19%	6%	–	–	–	4% (Note: 2% for Gary Bauer and 1% each for Orrin Hatch and Alan Keyes.)
Gallup	Jan. 25–26, 2000	65%	15%	7%	–	–	–	6% (Note: 4% for Alan Keyes and 2% for Gary Bauer.)
Gallup	Feb. 4–6, 2000	56%	34%	2%	–	–	–	3% (Note: 3% for Alan Keyes.)
Gallup	Feb. 14–15, 2000	58%	31%	–	–	–	–	3% (Note: 3% for Alan Keyes.)
Gallup	Feb. 20–21, 2000	58%	31%	–	–	–	–	3% (Note: 3% for Alan Keyes.)
Gallup	Feb. 25–27, 2000	57%	33%	–	–	–	–	4% (Note: 4% for Alan Keyes.)

== Schedule and results ==
Date (daily totals)	Total pledged delegates	Contest	Delegates won and popular vote						
Date (daily totals)	Total pledged delegates	Contest	George W. Bush	John McCain	Alan Keyes	Steve Forbes	Gary Bauer	Orrin Hatch	Other
January 24	0	Alaska	1,571 (36.28%)	412 (9.52%)	411 (9.49%)	1,566 (36.17%)	207 (4.78%)	163 (3.76%)	—
January 24	0	Iowa	10; 35,384 (41.01%)	4; 4,053 (4.67%)	12,329 (14.25%)	8; 26,338 (30.51%)	2; 7,367 (8.54%)	888 (1.02%)	—
February 1	17	New Hampshire	5; 72,330 (30.36%)	10; 115,606 (48.53%)	15,179 (6.37%)	2; 30,166 (12.66%)	1,640 (0.69%)	163 (0.07%)	3,122 (1.31%)
February 7 – 13	0	Hawaii	—	—	—	—	—	—	~800 (100.00%)
February 8	12	Delaware	12; 15,250 (50.73%)	7,638 (25.41%)	1,148 (3.82%)	5,883 (19.57%)	120 (0.40%)	21 (0.07%)	—
February 19	37	South Carolina	34; 305,998 (53.39%)	3; 239,964 (41.87%)	25,996 (4.54%)	449 (0.08%)	618 (0.11%)	76 (0.01%)	—
February 22 (88)	30	Arizona	115,115 (35.68%)	30; 193,708 (60.03%)	11,500 (3.56%)	1,211 (0.38%)	177 (0.05%)	637 (0.20%)	322 (0.10%)
February 22 (88)	58	Michigan	6; 549,665 (43.05%)	52; 605,805 (50.97%)	59,036 (4.62%)	4,894 (0.38%)	2,733 (0.21%)	905 (0.07%)	8,736 (0.68%)
February 23 – March 21	0	Nevada	—	—	—	—	—	—	? (?%)
February 26 (12)	4	American Samoa	4 ? (?%)	—	—	—	—	—	—
February 26 (12)	4	Guam	4 ? (?%)	—	—	—	—	—	—
February 26 (12)	4	Virgin Islands	4 ? (?%)	—	—	—	—	—	—
February 27	14	Puerto Rico	14; 87,375 (94.21%)	4,903 (5.29%)	49 (0.05%)	210 (0.23%)	34 (0.04%)	—	178 (0.19%)
February 29 (87)	56	Virginia	56; 350,588 (52.79%)	291,488 (43.89%)	20,356 (3.07%)	809 (0.12%)	852 (0.13%)	—	—
February 29 (87)	12	Washington	7; 284,053 (57.84%)	5; 191,101 (38.91%)	11,753 (2.39%)	1,749 (0.36%)	1,469 (0.30%)	1,023 (0.21%)	—
February 29 (87)	19	North Dakota	14; 6,865 (75.72%)	4; 1,717 (18.94%)	1; 481 (5.31%)	—	—	—	3 (0.03%)
March 7 (564) (Super Tuesday)	162	California	162; 1,725,162 (60.58%)	988,706 (34.72%)	112,747 (3.96%)	8,449 (0.30%)	6,860 (0.24%)	5,997 (0.21%)	—
March 7 (564) (Super Tuesday)	25	Connecticut	82,881 (46.28%)	25; 87,176 (48.74%)	5,913 (3.30%)	1,242 (0.69%)	373 (0.21%)	178 (0.10%)	1,222 (0.67%)
March 7 (564) (Super Tuesday)	54	Georgia	54; 430,480 (66.93%)	179,046 (27.84%)	29,640 (4.61%)	1,647 (0.26%)	1,962 (0.31%)	413 (0.06%)	—
March 7 (564) (Super Tuesday)	14	Maine	14; 49,308 (51.03%)	42,510 (44.00%)	2,989 (3.09%)	455 (0.47%)	324 (0.34%)	—	1,038 (1.07%)
March 7 (564) (Super Tuesday)	31	Maryland	31; 211,439 (56.23%)	135,981 (36.16%)	25,020 (6.65%)	1,678 (0.45%)	1,328 (0.35%)	588 (0.16%)	—
March 7 (564) (Super Tuesday)	37	Massachusetts	159,534 (31.78%)	37; 324,708 (64.69%)	12,630 (2.52%)	1,407 (0.28%)	1,744 (0.35%)	262 (0.05%)	1,658 (0.33%)
March 7 (564) (Super Tuesday)	0	Minnesota	11,531 (62.67%)	3,209 (17.44%)	3,661 (19.90%)	—	—	—	—
March 7 (564) (Super Tuesday)	35	Missouri	35; 275,366 (57.93%)	167,831 (35.31%)	27,282 (5.74%)	2,044 (0.43%)	1,038 (0.22%)	363 (0.08%)	1,439 (0.28%)
March 7 (564) (Super Tuesday)	93	New York	67; 1,102,850 (50.30%)	26; 937,655 (43.50%)	71,196 (3.60%)	49,817 (2.60%)	—	—	—
March 7 (564) (Super Tuesday)	69	Ohio	63; 810,369 (57.99%)	6; 516,790 (36.98%)	55,266 (3.95%)	8,934 (0.64%)	6,169 (0.44%)	—	—
March 7 (564) (Super Tuesday)	14	Rhode Island	13,170 (36.43%)	14; 21,754 (60.18%)	923 (2.55%)	89 (0.25%)	35 (0.10%)	35 (0.10%)	114 (0.32%)
March 7 (564) (Super Tuesday)	12	Vermont	28,741 (35.33%)	12; 49,045 (60.29%)	2,164 (2.66%)	616 (0.76%)	293 (0.36%)	—	496 (0.61%)
March 7 (564) (Super Tuesday)	18	Washington	18; 1,256 (82.15%)	197 (12.88%)	76 (4.97%)	—	—	—	—
March 10 (81)	12	Wyoming	12; 77.62%	10.29%	11.66%	—	—	—	
March 10 (81)	40	Colorado	28; 116,897 (64.71%)	12; 48,996 (27.12%)	11,871 (6.57%)	1,197 (0.66%)	1,190 (0.66%)	504 (0.28%)	—
March 10 (81)	29	Utah	29; 57,617 (63.28%)	12,784 (14.04%)	19,367 (21.27%)	859 (0.94%)	426 (0.47%)	—	—
March 14 (341)	80	Florida	80; 516,161 (73.80%)	139,397 (19.94%)	32,343 (4.63%)	6,522 (0.94%)	3,493 (0.50%)	1,371 (0.20%)	—
March 14 (341)	29	Louisiana	29; 86,038 (83.60%)	9,166 (8.91%)	5,900 (5.73%)	1,041 (1.01%)	768 (0.75%)	—	—
March 14 (341)	33	Mississippi	33; 101,042 (87.88%)	6,263 (5.45%)	6,478 (5.63%)	588 (0.51%)	475 (0.41%)	133 (0.12%)	—
March 14 (341)	38	Oklahoma	38; 98,781 (79.15%)	12,973 (10.39%)	11,595 (9.29%)	1,066 (0.85%)	394 (0.32%)	—	—
March 14 (341)	37	Tennessee	37; 193,166 (77.02%)	36,436 (14.53%)	16,916 (6.75%)	1,018 (0.41%)	1,305 (0.52%)	252 (0.10%)	0.68%
March 14 (341)	124	Texas	124; 986,416 (87.54%)	80,082 (7.11%)	43,516 (3.86%)	2,865 (0.25%)	2,189 (0.19%)	1,329 (0.12%)	10,363 (0.92%)
March 21	64	Illinois	64; 496,646 (67.40%)	158,752 (21.54%)	66,057 (8.97%)	10,334 (1.40%)	5,068 (0.69%)	—	—
April 4 (105)	68	Pennsylvania	68; 472,398 (72.46%)	145,719 (22.66%)	—	16,162 (2.51%)	8,806 (1.35%)	—	—
April 4 (105)	37	Wisconsin	37; 343,292 (69.24%)	89,684 (18.09%)	48,919 (9.87%)	5,505 (1.11%)	1,813 (0.37%)	1,712 (0.35%)	1,392 (0.98%)
April 29 – May 13	24	Minnesota	24	—	—	—	—	—	—
May 2 (107)	30	Indiana	30; 330,095 (81.17%)	76,569 (18.83%)	—	—	—	—	—
May 2 (107)	62	North Carolina	49; 253,485 (78.60%)	7; 35,018 (10.86%)	5; 25,320 (7.85%)	—	1; 3,311 (1.03%)	—	3,583 (1.67%)
May 2 (107)	15	Washington, D.C.	15; 1,771 (72.79%)	593 (24.37%)	—	—	—	—	69 (2.84%)
May 5	14	Hawaii	14	—	—	—	—	—	—
May 6	10	Wyoming	10	—	—	—	—	—	—
May 9 (27)	9	Nebraska	9; 145,176 (78.15%)	28,065 (15.11%)	12,073 (6.50%)	—	—	—	444 (0.24%)
May 9 (27)	18	West Virginia	18; 87,050 (79.57%)	14,121 (12.91%)	5,210 (4.76%)	1,733 (1.58%)	1,290 (1.18%)	—	—
May 16	24	Oregon	21; 292,522 (83.62%)	—	3; 46,754 (13.37%)	—	—	—	10,545 (3.01%)
May 19 (33)	23	Alaska	19	—	—	—	—	—	—
May 19 (33)	10	Pennsylvania	10	—	—	—	—	—	—
May 20 – June 3	18	Kentucky	18	—	—	—	—	—	—
May 23 (46)	24	Arkansas	19; 35,759 (80.23%)	—	5; 8,814 (19.77%)	—	—	—	—
May 23 (46)	22	Idaho	16; 116,385 (73.45%)	—	4; 30,263 (19.10%)	—	—	—	2; 11,798 (7.45%)
May 23 (46)	0	Kentucky	75,783 (82.98%)	5,780 (6.33%)	4,337 (4.75%)	1,829 (1.30%)	2,408 (2.64%)	—	1,186 (1.00%)
May 25 (52)	35	Kansas	35	—	—	—	—	—	—
May 25 (52)	17	Nevada	17	—	—	—	—	—	—
May 30	8	New York	8	—	—	—	—	—	—
June 6 (189)	44	Alabama	44; 171,077 (84.24%)	—	23,394 (11.52%)	—	—	—	8,606 (4.24%)
June 6 (189)	25	Indiana	25	—	—	—	—	—	—
June 6 (189)	23	Montana	23; 89,122 (77.59%)	—	20,822 (18.32%)	—	—	—	4,655 (4.10%)
June 6 (189)	54	New Jersey	54; 201,209 (83.56%)	39,601 (16.44%)	—	—	—	—	—
June 6 (189)	21	New Mexico	21; 62,161 (82.63%)	7,619 (10.13%)	4,850 (6.45%)	—	—	—	600 (0.80%)
June 6 (189)	22	South Dakota	22; 35,418 (78.22%)	6,228 (13.75%)	3,478 (7.68%)	—	—	—	155 (0.34%)
June 9	10	Minnesota	10	—	—	—	—	—	—
June 9 – 10	25	Iowa	25	—	—	—	—	—	—
June 10	13	Kentucky	13	—	—	—	—	—	—
June 16 – 17 (17)	10	Illinois	10	—	—	—	—	—	—
June 16 – 17 (17)	7	Washington	7	—	—	—	—	—	—
June 23 – 24	6	Idaho	6	—	—	—	—	—	—
Total 2,066 pledged delegates 19,519,539 votes			1,806 12,034,676 (62.0%)	243 6,061,332 (31.2%)	14 985,819 (5.1%)	2 171,860 (0.9%)	1 60,709 (0.3%)	0 15,958 (0.1%)	0 61,246 (0.3%)

=== Nationwide ===
Results by county, shaded according to winning candidate's percentage of the vote

=== Notable endorsements ===
Note: Some of the endorsers switched positions.

George W. Bush

- Bush's Father & Former President George H.W. Bush from Texas
- Bush's Mother & Former First Lady Barbara Bush from Texas
- Senate Majority Leader Trent Lott from Mississippi
- Former HUD Secretary and 1996 Vice Presidential nominee Jack Kemp from New York
- Senator Bob Smith from New Hampshire
- Former Governor and White House Chief of Staff John H. Sununu of New Hampshire
- Governor Jane Dee Hull of Arizona
- Governor John Engler of Michigan
- Senator John Warner from Virginia
- Governor Jim Gilmore of Virginia
- Senator John Ashcroft from Missouri
- Governor Paul Cellucci of Massachusetts
- Governor Tommy Thompson of Wisconsin
- Representative John Thune from South Dakota

John McCain

- Senator Jon Kyl from Arizona
- Senator Fred Thompson of Tennessee
- Senator Mike DeWine from Ohio
- Senator Chuck Hagel from Nebraska
- Representative Lindsey Graham from South Carolina
- Representative Mark Sanford from South Carolina
- Representative Peter T. King from New York
- Staten Island Borough President Guy Molinari

Steve Forbes

- Governor Gary Johnson of New Mexico
- Representative Bob Barr from Georgia
- Representative Roscoe Bartlett from Maryland
- Ohio Secretary of State Ken Blackwell
- Sarah Palin, mayor of Wasilla, Alaska

Alan Keyes

- Representative Tom Coburn from Oklahoma
- Filmmaker Michael Moore from Michigan (joke endorsement)

Orrin Hatch

- Senator Robert Foster Bennett from Utah

Lamar Alexander

- Governor Mike Huckabee of Arkansas
- Former Governor Terry Branstad of Iowa

Dan Quayle

- Former Governor Carroll A. Campbell of South Carolina

John Kasich

- Mike DeWine (initially)
- Senator George Voinovich from Ohio
- Representative John Boehner from Ohio

== See also ==
- 2000 Democratic Party presidential primaries
