= 2000 California Republican presidential primary =

- March 7, 2000
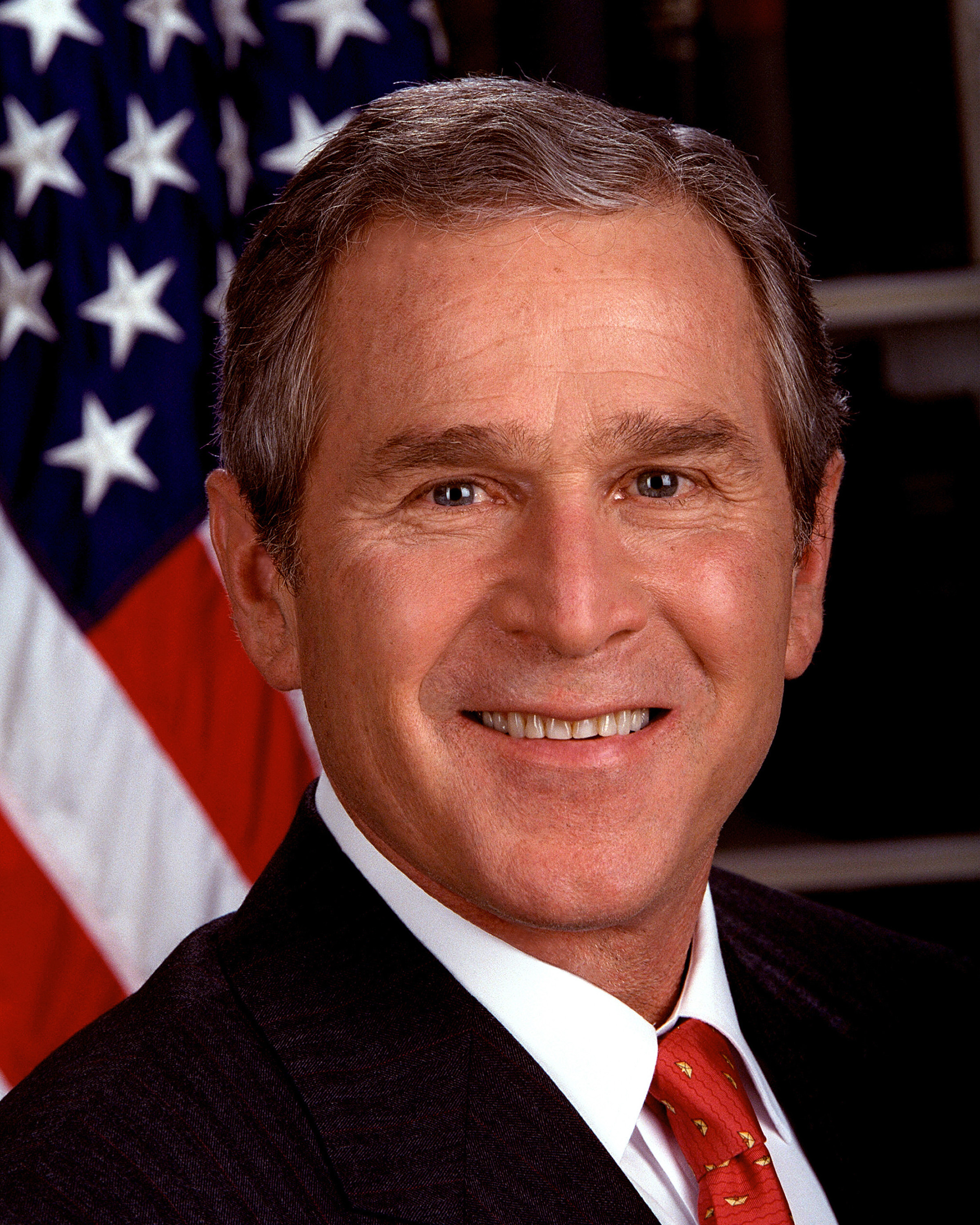

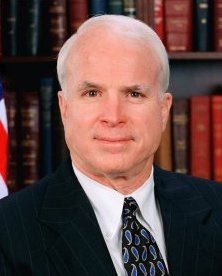
Candidate	George W. Bush	John McCain
Home state	Texas	Arizona
Delegate count	162	0
Popular vote	1,725,162	988,706
Percentage	60.6%	34.7%
- Results by county Bush 40-50% Bush 50-60% Bush 60-70% McCain 40-50% McCain 50-60%

The 2000 California Republican presidential primary was held on March 7, 2000. Governor George W. Bush of Texas won easily over Senator John McCain of Arizona and former Ambassador Alan Keyes.

At the time, California had a blanket primary, meaning all candidates of all parties were on the same ballot, but the state parties, exploiting a loophole in the election law, used color-coded ballots so that only votes from party members would count. Thus, many votes for McCain—nearly 800,000—were discounted. It was thought by pundits that McCain could demonstrate his viability in a large Democratic state if he won the general primary; however, Bush still won a solid majority with all the non-Republican votes factored in.

== Results ==
Key:	Withdrew prior to contest

2000 California Republican presidential primary
Candidate	GOP votes	GOP %	Total votes	Total %	National delegates
George W. Bush	1,725,162	60.58%	2,168,466	52.21%	162
John McCain	988,706	34.72%	1,780,570	42.87%	0
Alan Keyes	112,747	3.96%	170,442	4.10%	0
Steve Forbes	8,449	0.30%	14,484	0.35%	0
Gary Bauer	6,860	0.24%	10,529	0.25%	0
Orrin Hatch	5,997	0.21%	9,202	0.22%	0
Glenn Redwood (write-in)	N/A	0.59%	89	0.59%	0
David S. Rosenbaum (write-in)	N/A	<0.01%	4	<0.01%	0
Totals	N/A	100.00%	4,153,702	100.00%	162

== See also ==
- 2000 California Democratic presidential primary
- 2000 Republican Party presidential primaries
