= 2000 Texas Republican presidential primary =

- March 14, 2000

124 delegates to the 2000 Republican National Convention
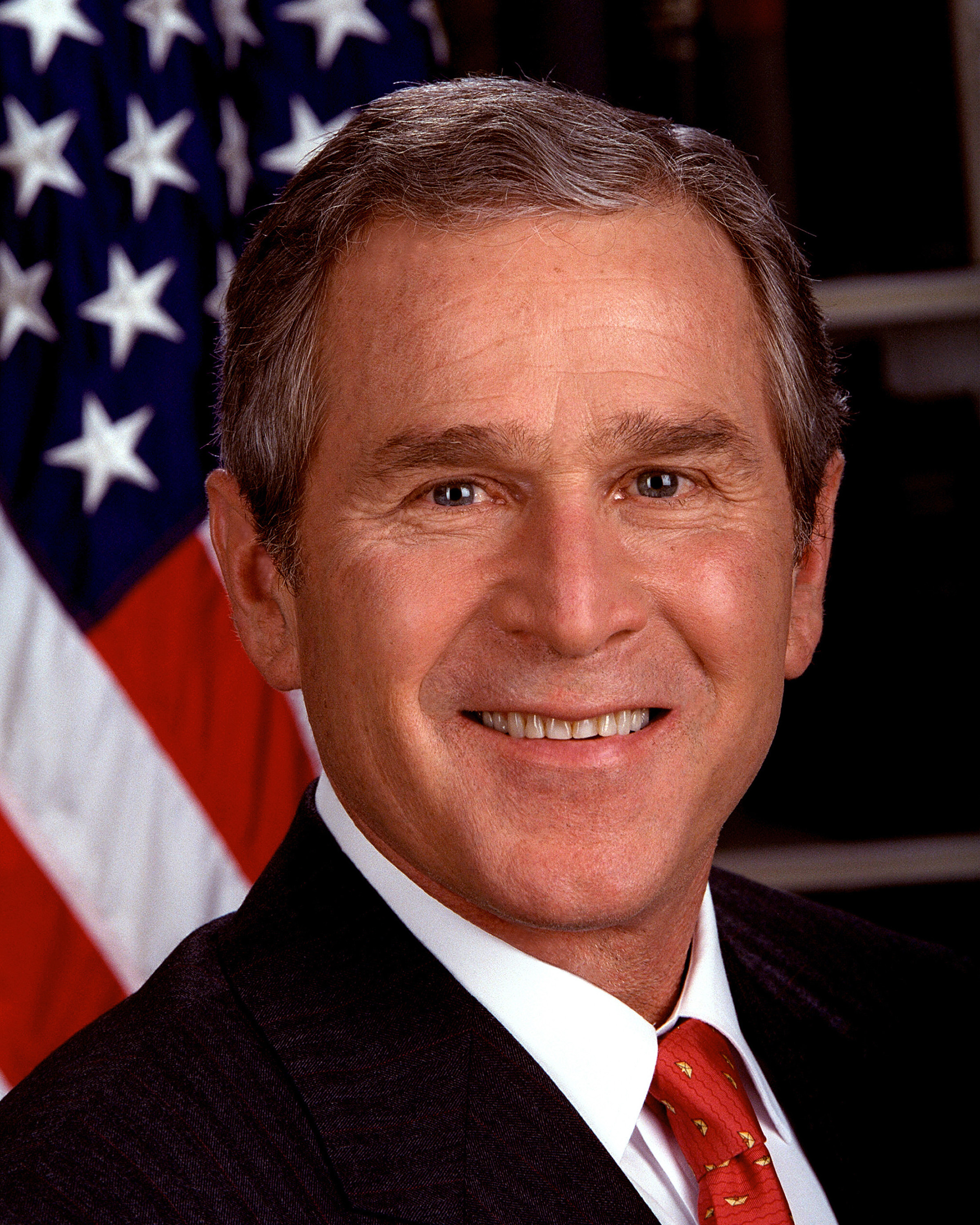

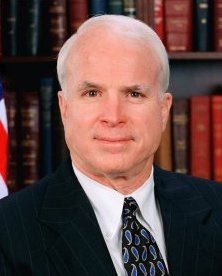
| Candidate | George W. Bush | John McCain |
| Home state | Texas | Arizona |
| Delegate count | 124 | 0 |
| Popular vote | 986,416 | 80,082 |
| Percentage | 87.54% | 7.11% |

The 2000 Texas Republican presidential primary was held on March 14, 2000, as part of the 2000 presidential primaries for the 2000 presidential election. 124 delegates to the 2000 Republican National Convention were allocated to the presidential candidates, the contest was held alongside primaries in Florida, Louisiana, Mississippi, Oklahoma and Tennessee.

Texas Governor George W. Bush won the contest by taking all the delegates.

== Candidates ==
The following candidates on the ballot:

- George W. Bush
- John McCain
- Alan Keyes
- Uncommitted (voting option)
- Steve Forbes
- Gary Bauer
- Orrin Hatch
- Charles Urban

== Results ==
Texas Governor George W. Bush won the contest by taking all 124 delegates to the Republican National Convention, Bush also received almost 88% of the popular votes from the state of Texas, John McCain, U.S. Senator from Arizona, received 7,11% of the popular votes and Alan Keyes received 3,86% of the popular votes.

Texas Republican primary, March 14, 2000
| Candidate | Votes | Percentage | Actual delegate count | | |
| Candidate | Votes | Percentage | Bound | Unbound | Total |
|---|---|---|---|---|---|
| George W. Bush | 986,416 | 87,54% | 124 | | 124 |
| John McCain | 80,082 | 7,11% | | | |
| Alan Keyes | 43,518 | 3,86% | | | |
| Uncommitted (voting option) | 9,570 | 0,85% | | | |
| Steve Forbes | 2,865 | 0,25% | | | |
| Gary Bauer | 2,189 | 0,19% | | | |
| Orrin Hatch | 1,324 | 0,12% | | | |
| Charles Urban | 793 | 0,9% | | | |
| Total: | 1,126,757 | 100.0% | 124 | | 124 |

== See also ==
- 2000 Texas Democratic presidential primary
- 2000 United States presidential election in Texas
- 2000 Republican Party presidential primaries
