= 2000 Illinois Republican presidential primary =

- March 21, 2000

74 Republican National Convention delegates (64 pledged, 10 unpledged) Pledged delegates directly-elected in vote separate from statewide presidential preference vote

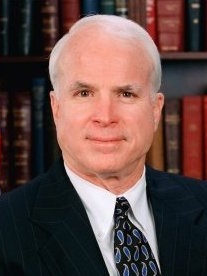

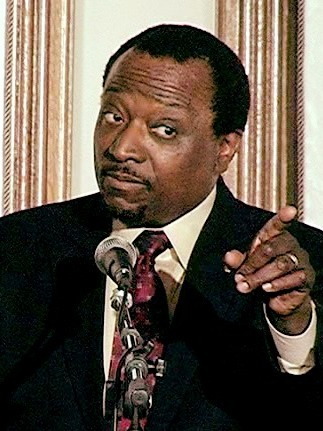
Candidate	George W. Bush	John McCain (withdrawn)	Alan Keyes
Home state	Texas	Arizona	Maryland
Delegate count	64	0	0
Popular vote	496,685	158,768	66,066
Percentage	67.40%	21.54%	8.97%

The 2000 Illinois Republican presidential primary was held on March 21 in the U.S. state of Illinois as one of the Republican Party's statewide nomination contests ahead of the 2000 presidential election. 74 delegates to the 2000 Republican National Convention were allocated to the presidential candidates.

Texas Governor George W. Bush won the contest with 67.40% of the popular vote and the majority in every congressional district.

== Procedure ==
Illinois assigned 60 of its 70 delegates to be directly elected. The Illinois primary was a so-called "loophole" primary, in which delegates were assigned by direct-level voting on delegate candidates whose proclaimed presidential preferences were listed beside their names on the ballot (as opposed to be assigned based upon the performance of a candidate in the presidential preference vote). Congressional districts were allocated delegates based on the extent of the district's support for Bob Dole in the 1996 presidential general election.

The remaining ten unpledged delegates were selected at the Illinois Republican Party Convention.

== Results ==
Texas Governor George W. Bush won the Illinois Republican presidential primary, acquiring all of the state's 64 delegates to the Republican National Convention.

Bush received 67.4% of the popular vote, while John McCain, a Senator from Arizona and the eventual 2008 Republican presidential nominee, and Alan Keyes received 21.54% and 8.97% of the vote, respectively. The split of the popular vote across three candidates, despite McCain's withdrawal earlier in the month and Keyes' status as a fringe candidate, was interpreted as dissatisfaction with Bush as the presumptive nominee.

2000 Illinois Republican presidential primary
Candidate	Votes	%	Delegates
George W. Bush	496,685	67.40	64
John McCain (withdrawn)	158,768	21.54	0
Alan Keyes	66,066	8.97	0
Steve Forbes (withdrawn)	10,334	1.40	0
Gary Bauer (withdrawn)	5,068	0.69	0
Total	736,921	100%	64

== See also ==
- 2000 Illinois Democratic presidential primary
- 2000 United States presidential election in Illinois
- 2000 Republican Party presidential primaries
