= 2000 West Virginia Republican presidential primary =

- May 9, 2000

18 delegates to the 2000 Republican National Convention
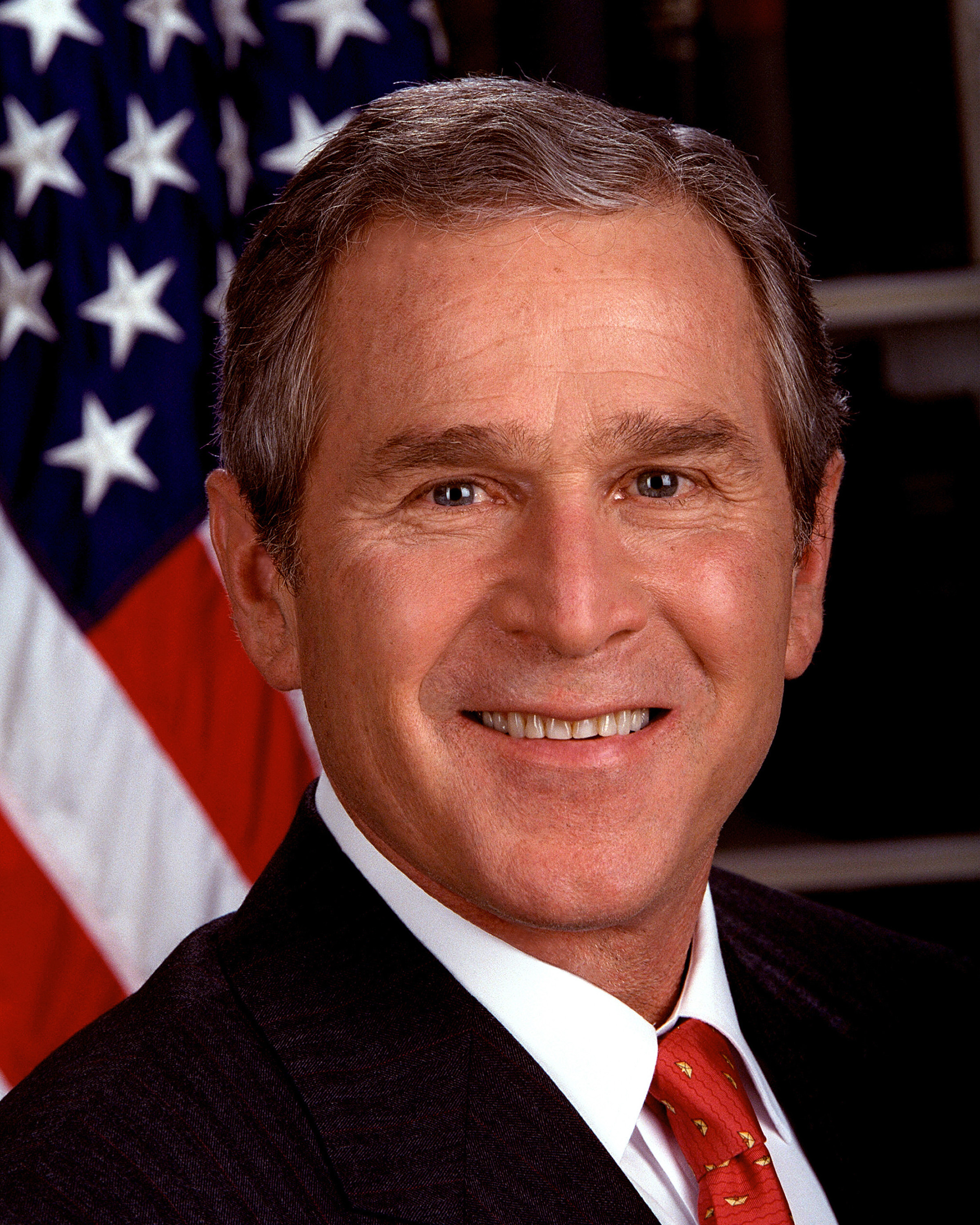

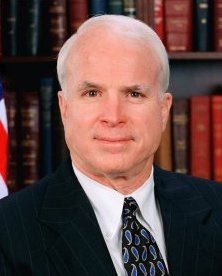
Candidate	George W. Bush	John McCain
Home state	Texas	Arizona
Delegate count	18	0
Popular vote	87,050	14,121
Percentage	79.57%	12.91%
- County results Bush 70-80% Bush 80-90%

The 2000 West Virginia Republican presidential primary was held on May 9, 2000, as part of the 2000 presidential primaries for the 2000 presidential election. 18 delegates to the 2000 Republican National Convention were allocated to the presidential candidates, the contest was held alongside primaries in Nebraska.

Texas Governor George W. Bush won the contest, taking all delegates with 80% of the popular vote.

== Candidates ==
The following candidates achieved on the ballot:

- George W. Bush
- John McCain
- Alan Keyes
- Steve Forbes
- Gary Bauer

== Results ==
With 80% of the popular vote, Texas Governor George W. Bush won in a landslide, also he taking all delegates to the Republican National Convention, the second place was U.S. Senator from Arizona John McCain with his 13% of the popular vote, Alan Keyes was in the third place with his 5% of the popular vote, the other candidates were Steve Forbes in fourth place, and finally Gary Bauer in fifth place.

West Virginia Republican primary, May 9, 2000
Candidate	Votes	Percentage	Actual delegate count		
Candidate	Votes	Percentage	Bound	Unbound	Total
George W. Bush	87,050	79.57%	18		18
John McCain	14,121	12.91%			
Alan Keyes	5,210	4.76%			
Steve Forbes	1,733	1.58%			
Gary Bauer	1,290	1.18%			
Total:	109,404	100.00%	18		18

== See also ==
- 2000 West Virginia Democratic presidential primary
- 2000 United States presidential election in West Virginia
- 2000 Republican Party presidential primaries
