= Dan Quayle 2000 presidential campaign =

American political campaign

Dan Quayle 2000
- Campaign: 2000 United States presidential election
- Candidate: Dan Quayle; 44th Vice President of the United States (1989–1993)
- Affiliation: Republican Party
- Announced: January 21, 1999 (Exploratory committee); April 14, 1999
- Suspended: September 28, 1999

Website
- www.quayle.org (archived – Feb. 8, 1999)

The 2000 presidential campaign of Dan Quayle, former vice president of the United States, began with an announcement on January 21, 1999 that he was forming an exploratory committee. A few months later, on April 14, he officially announced his candidacy for the Republican Party nomination. Dan Quayle had been an elected member of Congress since 1977, and he was George H. W. Bush's running mate in his successful 1988 presidential campaign, serving as vice president from 1989 to 1993, losing reelection in 1992. Throughout his time in government, he was considered a staunch conservative who was especially popular among the Christian right, but several gaffes during his vice presidency had damaged his reputation among the general public. Though he had initially considered running for president in 1996, he ultimately passed on this.

In the years leading up to the 2000 presidential election, multiple news sources speculated that Quayle might run, and during the 1998 midterm elections, he campaigned for numerous Republican candidates. However, when Quayle announced the formation of an exploratory committee in early 1999, political analysts were skeptical of his chances of winning, citing his image issues and the popularity of George W. Bush (son of former President Bush). Opinion polling throughout the campaign seemed to confirm this, as he usually polled in the single-digits, far behind the frontrunner Bush.

Quayle made family values and his foreign policy experience a keystone of his campaign and attacked the Bill Clinton administration on both fronts repeatedly, while on specific policy proposals, he emphasized his plan for a 30 percent tax cut across the board. However, Quayle continued to trail other Republican candidates in both fundraising and support, and by August, numerous news sources were reporting that a poor performance in the Iowa Straw Poll could be disastrous for his campaign. Quayle finished eighth in the straw poll and a little over a month later, on September 28, Quayle withdrew from the race, citing a lack of funds and low polling numbers. The following year, Quayle endorsed Bush, who went on to win the general election.

== Background ==
James Danforth Quayle was born in Indianapolis, Indiana in 1947. He attended college at DePauw University and Indiana University Indianapolis, during which time he also served as a member of the Indiana National Guard. In 1974, the same year he graduated, he was admitted to the bar and began practicing law in Huntington, Indiana. In 1976, he was elected as a member of the Republican Party to the United States House of Representatives, a position he would hold until being elected to the United States Senate in 1980. During the 1988 United States presidential election, he was chosen as the running mate of eventual winner George H. W. Bush, with Quayle sworn in as Vice President of the United States in 1989. However, Bush and Quayle lost reelection in the 1992 presidential election.

As an elected official, Quayle was a staunch conservative, appealing to the Christian right and positioning himself as a Reagan Republican. Despite his electoral successes at a young age (being elected as a representative at 29, a senator at 33, and vice president at 41), he lacked significant support from Republican leaders. In a 1999 article in The Washington Post, journalist David Von Drehle stated that Quayle "was never the darling of the party core". His selection as Bush's running mate was questioned by some within the party, and his numerous gaffes damaged his political reputation. Following his term as vice president, Quayle considered running for president in the 1996 presidential election, going so far as establishing an exploratory committee and raising money through a political action committee (PAC) in late 1994. However, he withdrew from the race in February 1995. Prior to his withdrawal, The New York Times had labeled Quayle as "the most popular candidate among religious conservatives", and Executive Director Ralph Reed of the Christian Coalition of America stated that many of his group's members "felt an almost bottomless well of admiration" for Quayle.

== Speculation ==
In the years leading up to the 2000 presidential election, news sources began to speculate that Quayle would again attempt a run for the presidency. In May 1997, The Washington Post reported that Quayle's political group Campaign America (a PAC he had inherited from President Bush) had relocated its headquarters to near Phoenix, Arizona in order to be located closer to the strategically important state of California, where Quayle had been developing support. Quayle had also been active in campaigning for Republican candidates in elections across the United States, such as in the Virginia's gubernatorial election and in New Mexico's 3rd congressional district special election, and he made numerous speeches and appearances at events nationwide. However, at the time, opinion polls still placed Quayle behind other potential candidates including Texas Governor George W. Bush (son of former President Bush) and retired General Colin Powell. In late February and early March 1998, Quayle participated in the Southern Republican Leadership Conference in Biloxi, Mississippi, but in the straw poll conducted there, he came in third place behind Bush (who did not attend the conference) and businessman Steve Forbes. During the 1998 elections, Quayle visited 35 states and made 175 campaign visits, while his PAC raised $6 million for Republican candidates. In addition, former New Hampshire Governor and White House Chief of Staff John H. Sununu remained a firm supporter of Quayle, having previously supported him during his tentative 1996 run. On December 30 of that year, Senator John McCain of Arizona became the first Republican to officially declare his candidacy when he filed to create an exploratory committee that day.

== Exploratory committee ==
On January 21, 1999, while on CNN's Larry King Live, Quayle announced his intention to run for president. The same night, he sent out a press release from the "Quayle 2000 Exploratory Committee" that outlined some of his policy proposals and attacked "liberal Republicans". He also directed an attack towards George W. Bush by saying that he had ordered his staff to never use the phrase "compassionate conservative" (a slogan Bush had embraced), arguing that the "silly and insulting term was created by liberal Republicans and is nothing more than code for surrendering our values and principles". However, Quayle stopped short of attacking any candidates by name, referencing an adherence he had to the Eleventh Commandment. Among his proposals was a 30 percent tax cut across the board. Quayle stated that he would make a formal announcement on February 3, by which time he would have filed an official statement of candidacy with the Federal Election Commission (FEC). Speaking to Larry King, he said his goal was to raise $20 million (equivalent to $38.7 million in 2020) for the campaign.

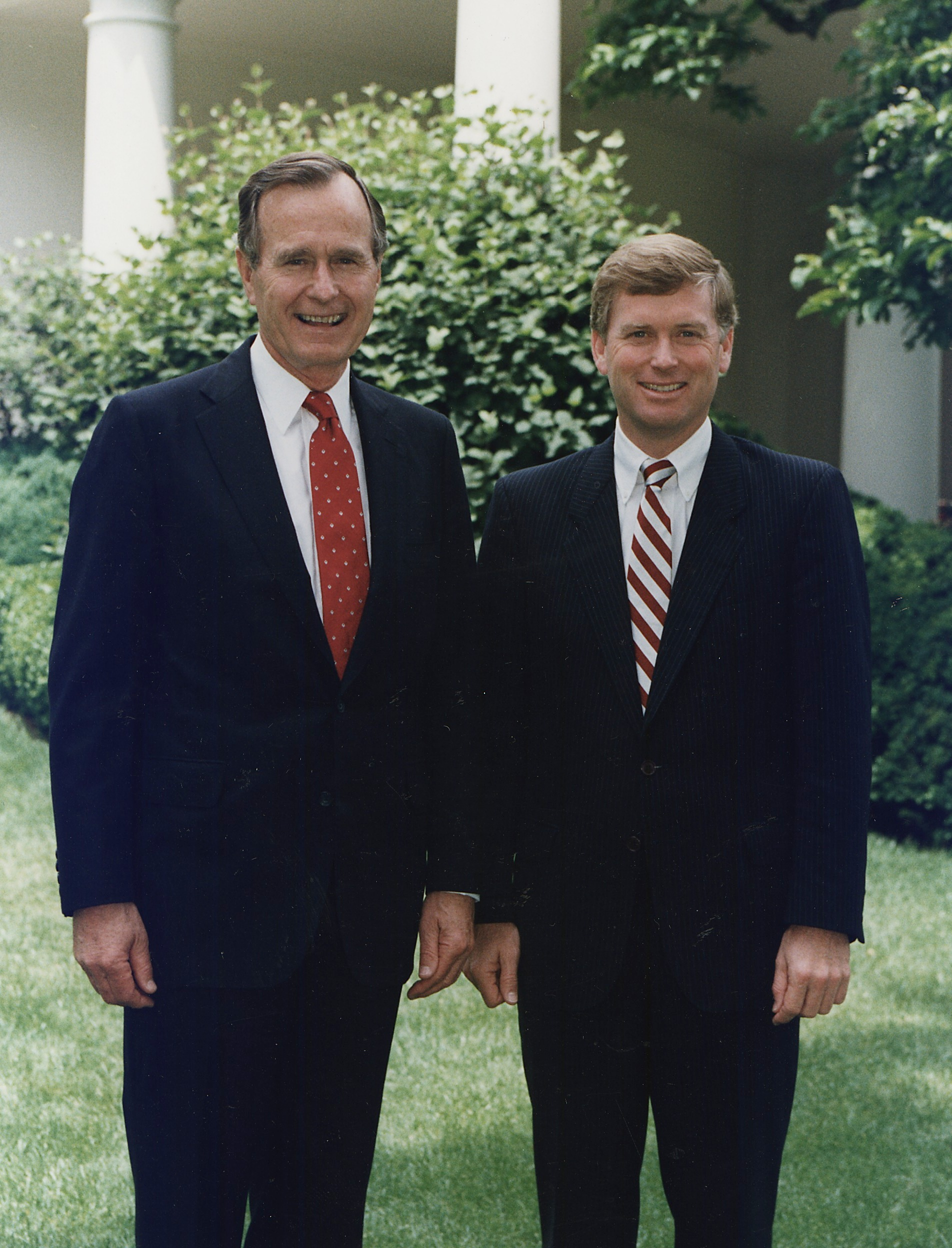
Quayle served as vice president for President George H. W. Bush (left), who supported his son over Quayle in the 2000 election.

The day after this announcement, Quayle spoke at the annual meeting of the Conservative Political Action Conference. Commenting on the announcement, political analyst Stuart Rothenberg said, "On one level he isn't the joke some people make him out to be, and on a personal level he is liked by Republicans, has the ability to raise money and appeals to social conservatives. But his big problem is the problem. I don't think there are enough Republicans who take him seriously as someone who can get the nomination and be elected President." Additional concern came from Quayle's former chief of staff, Bill Kristol, who questioned if Quayle could overcome his public image issues that had plagued his vice presidency. Addressing analysts who claimed his campaign was a longshot, Quayle said, "I want to be president. I love proving people wrong, and I'm going to do it again." King, in a somewhat double-edged comment, told Quayle, "You're not a joke like you once were". In a more positive review, Ralph Reed stated that Quayle had name brand recognition and could be underestimated in the campaign.

On January 28, Quayle filed with the FEC to officially form an exploratory committee. On February 3, before an audience in Indianapolis, Quayle announced that he had established an exploratory committee. In the proceeding weeks, he traveled to numerous spots around the country on a campaign tour, including New Hampshire, which holds the first primaries in the nation. That same month, he talked to former President Bush about the campaign and said that the former president was going to support his son in the election, which Quayle said was understandable. On March 19, Quayle criticized President Bill Clinton and his administration's relationship with China at a speech given to the Los Angeles World Affairs Council, which The Washington Post called "the first foreign policy speech" of his campaign. Through April, however, Quayle continued to poll in the single digits. On April 8, Reuters reported that Quayle's campaign had raised over $2 million, placing him behind Bush and McCain (who had raised approximately $7 million and $4 million, respectively), but ahead of candidate Gary Bauer, who had raised about $1.4 million. According to Sununu, former President Bush's support of his son significantly helped his fundraising at Quayle's expense.

== Campaign developments ==
=== Announcement ===
On April 14, 1999, at a speech in front of about 5,000 attendees at Huntington North High School in Huntington County, Indiana, Quayle officially announced his candidacy. During the speech, he touted his 30 percent tax cut proposal and his executive experience while criticizing the "dishonest decade of Bill Clinton and Al Gore". (Note: Journalist Christopher Caldwell stated that the "dishonest decade" is an allusion to a line from the poem "September 1, 1939" by W. H. Auden.) He also made veiled attacks at George W. Bush, saying, "We don't need another President who needs on-the-job training" and "The Presidency is not to be inherited". He also announced that former Senator Dan Coats of Indiana, who was appointed to fill Quayle's Senate seat following the latter's ascension to the Vice Presidency, would serve as his campaign's national chairman.

=== Campaign activities ===
On May 7, CNN reported that the Quayle campaign had spent roughly $26,000 (one of their largest expenditures) setting up the campaign's website. On May 19, Quayle gave a speech at the Commonwealth Club of California where he spoke in favor of family values in light of violent events involving young Americans, such as the recent Columbine High School massacre. Quayle blamed the "legal aristocracy" on what he called a decline in morals and emphasized that, while he supported measures such as raising the legal age for purchasing some firearms from 18 to 21, he was more concerned with changes to American culture. Quayle also continued to emphasize his experience in foreign policy, criticizing the Clinton administration's actions in the Yugoslav Wars and their interactions with China. Both foreign policy and family values would remain a keystone of Quayle's campaign. By the end of May, Quayle had recruited former Senator Mack Mattingly of Georgia to head his campaign. However, the Quayle campaign was still failing to gain traction, with a Gallup Poll released in early June showing him polling at 9 percent, 37 percent below Bush. Bush remained the frontrunner, despite not having formally declared his candidacy yet. That same month, Quayle appeared on CBS This Morning where he claimed that, despite Bush's lead, he expected to beat him in both the Iowa caucuses and New Hampshire primaries. Quayle would continue to attack Bush, and in particular his "compassionate conservative" slogan, arguing instead for "real compassion" that his campaign offered. By mid-June, Bush had officially declared his candidacy, which CNN reported had "[left] other hopefuls scrambling". Meanwhile, Quayle's campaign faced some instability issues after national co-chairman Kirk Fordice, a former governor of Mississippi, resigned following revelations that Fordice was engaged in an extramarital affair. In a poll collected on June 27, Bush placed first with 59 percent, followed by what CNN called a "four-way tie" with Elizabeth Dole (8 percent), Forbes, Quayle (both 6 percent), and McCain (5 percent). The following day, Quayle spoke in Washington, D.C. before the American Enterprise Institute. Additionally, in July, he released a book, published by Word Publishing, that outlined many of his policy proposals, Worth Fighting For. Also, on July 22, he appeared on The Tonight Show with Jay Leno.

=== Iowa Straw Poll ===
By August, multiple news sources were stating that performing well in the Iowa Straw Poll, held on August 14, was crucial to Quayle's continuing candidacy. (Note: Sources included CNN, The Guardian, the San Francisco Chronicle, and The Washington Post.) By August 9, Quayle had spent 39 days campaigning in the state, and he had attacked the Clinton administration's agriculture policies while campaigning in the largely agricultural state. Quayle, however, downplayed the importance of the poll and compared it to a political machine, where candidates "buy votes". Quayle also stated that he would continue his campaign regardless of his finish in the poll. On August 11, in an opinion poll conducted prior to the straw poll, Quayle received 5 percent of the vote, behind Bush (37 percent), Forbes (14.6 percent), and Dole (9 percent). The straw poll results were worse for Quayle, as they saw him finish in eighth place and behind several other conservative candidates. In total, he gathered 916 votes for 4 percent of the total, compared to Bush, the winner, who gathered 7,418 votes for 31 percent of the total. Following the straw poll, numerous news sources began to report that Quayle's campaign would be significantly hurt by the results, while Bush had solidified his frontrunner status. Kristol stated, "I think he should get out [of the race]. He's a good man, and he's served the country well, but it'd be better for him to get out now than to soldier on." However, Quayle remained in the race and continued to downplay the straw poll, stating in one interview that he participated "out of respect to the Iowa Republican Party". As late as September 9, journalist Adam Nagourney of The New York Times stated that Quayle receiving the Republican nomination remained "a realistic goal, if admittedly a difficult one". Meanwhile, Representative Roscoe Bartlett, who had just taken over as head of Quayle's campaign operations in Maryland, called his task in the campaign either "a profile in courage or an act of stupidity".

=== Withdrawal ===
On September 27, despite continued campaigning, multiple sources reported that, according to some of his advisors, Quayle was planning to drop out of the race. (Note: Sources included BBC News, the Chicago Tribune, the New York Post, The New York Times, and the San Francisco Chronicle.) By this point in the race, Bush had firmly established himself as the frontrunner and had raised over $50 million compared to Quayle's $3.4 million. The following day, at a ballroom in the Arizona Biltmore Hotel in Phoenix, Quayle announced an end to his candidacy, citing a lack of funds and support. While he did not offer an endorsement for any other candidates, he stated his intent to help whoever gained the Republican nomination to succeed. On October 5, he appeared on the Late Show with David Letterman, where he stated that he would be uninterested in becoming the Republican nominee's running mate. By 2000, Quayle had endorsed George W. Bush, who would go on to win the election and be inaugurated as president in 2001.

Quayle would be the last former Vice President until fellow Hoosier Mike Pence in 2024 to not receive their party's nomination.

== Aftermath ==
In 1999, the same year Bloomberg News reports that Quayle "left politics", he joined the private-equity firm Cerberus Capital Management. In 2001, The New York Times speculated that Quayle might run in the 2002 Arizona gubernatorial election, though he later declined. Talking about the campaign in 2020, Quayle stated that it had been "bad luck" and "bad timing" that he had run at the same time that George W. Bush did. As of 2021, he is the chairman of the global investments branch of Cerberus.
