= 2000 South Dakota Republican presidential primary =

- June 6, 2000

22 delegates to the Republican National Convention (22 pledged) The number of pledged delegates received is determined by the popular vote
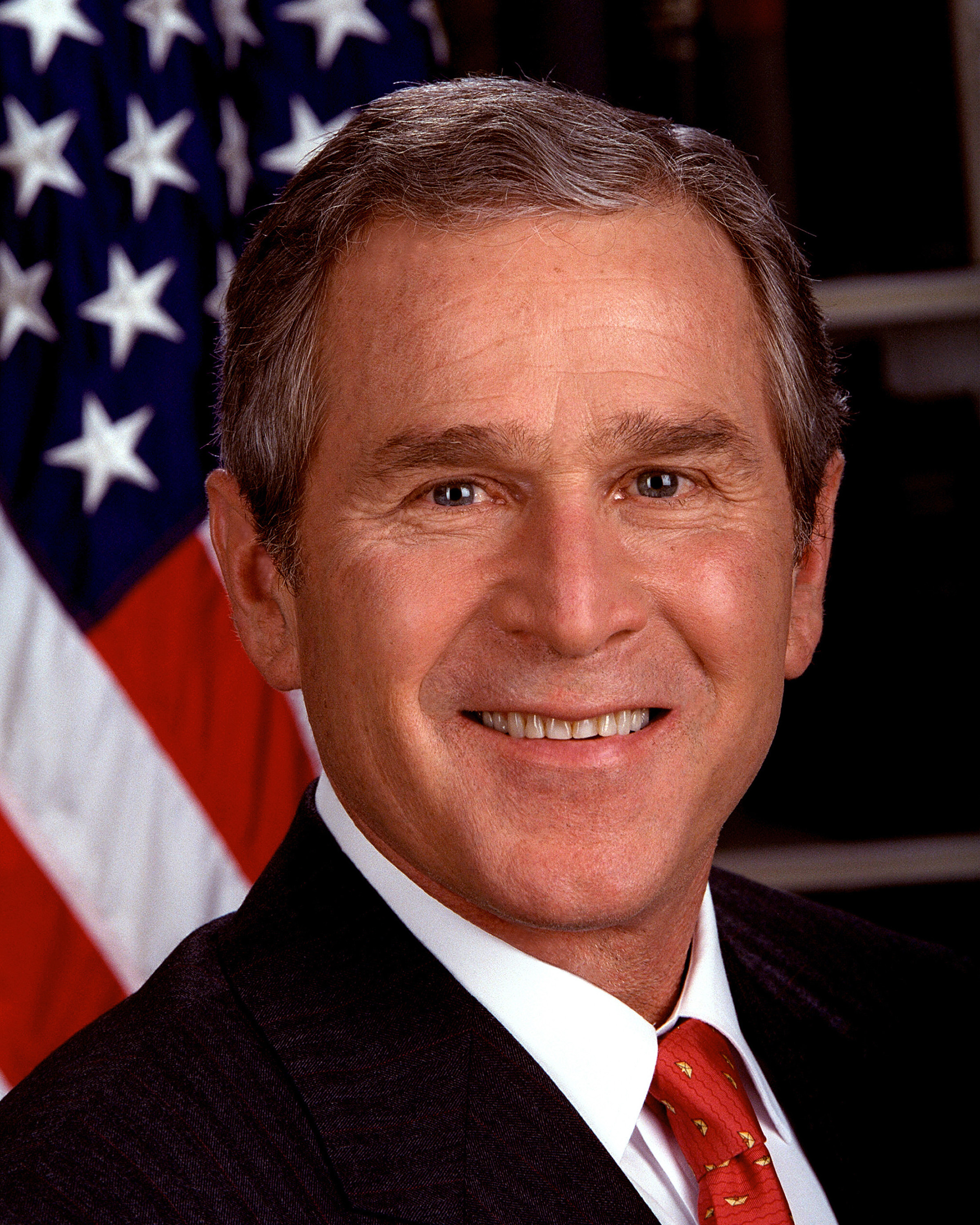

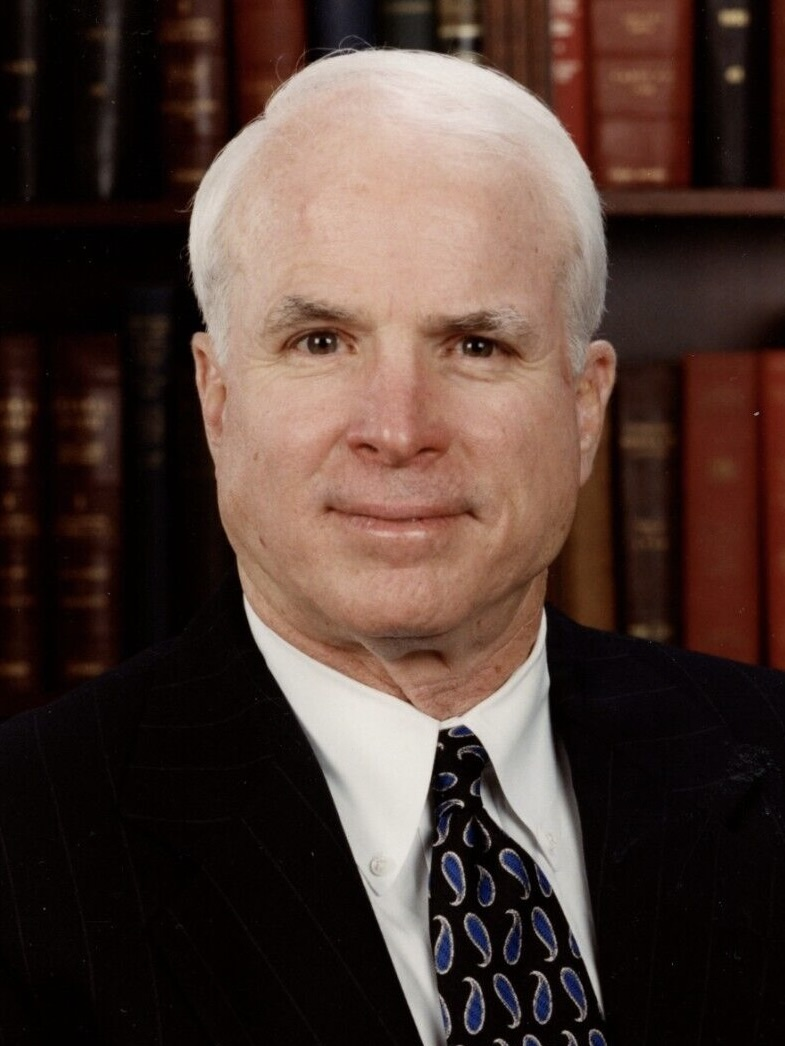

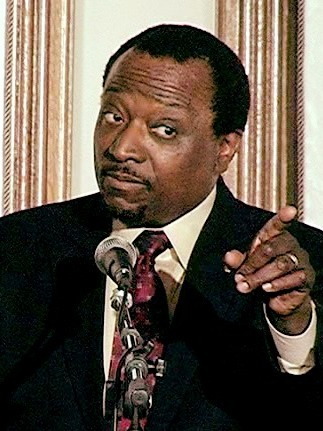
Candidate	George W. Bush	John McCain (withdrawn)	Alan Keyes
Home state	Texas	Arizona	Maryland
Delegate count	22	0	0
Popular vote	35,418	6,228	3,478
Percentage	78.22%	13.75%	7.68%
- Primary results by county

The 2000 South Dakota Republican presidential primary took place on June 6, 2000, as one of five final primaries on the same day in the Republican Party primaries for the 2000 presidential election. The South Dakota primary was a closed primary, with the state awarding 22 delegates to the 2000 Republican National Convention, of whom all 22 were pledged delegates allocated on the basis of the primary results.

Texas governor and presumptive nominee George W. Bush won the primary with roughly 79% of the vote and won 22 delegates, helping him solidify his presumptive nomination over John McCain, who had suspended his campaign three months earlier. McCain garnered 14% of the vote, while Alan Keyes received roughly 8%. Minor candidate James Attia received under 1% of the vote.

== Procedure ==
South Dakota was one of five states that voted on June 6, 2000, in the Republican primaries, along with Alabama, Montana, New Jersey, and New Mexico.

Voting took place throughout the state from 8 a.m. until 8 p.m. In the closed primary, candidates had to meet a threshold of 20% at the congressional district or statewide level in order to be considered viable. The 22 pledged delegates to the 2000 Republican National Convention were allocated proportionally on the basis of the primary results. Of these, 1 was allocated to the state's lone congressional district and another 6 were allocated on an at-large basis, in addition to 13 bonus delegates.

Pledged national convention delegates
Type	Del.
CD1	1
CD2	1
CD3	1
At-large	6
Bonus	13
Total pledged delegates	22

== Candidates ==
The following candidates appeared on the ballot:

Running

- George W. Bush
- Alan Keyes
- James Attia

Withdrawn

- John McCain

== Results ==
2000 South Dakota Republican presidential primary
Candidate	Votes	%	Delegates
George W. Bush	35,418	78.22	22
John McCain (withdrawn)	6,228	13.75	
Alan Keyes	3,478	7.68	
James Attia	155	0.34	
Total	45,279	100%	22
