= Political positions of George W. Bush =

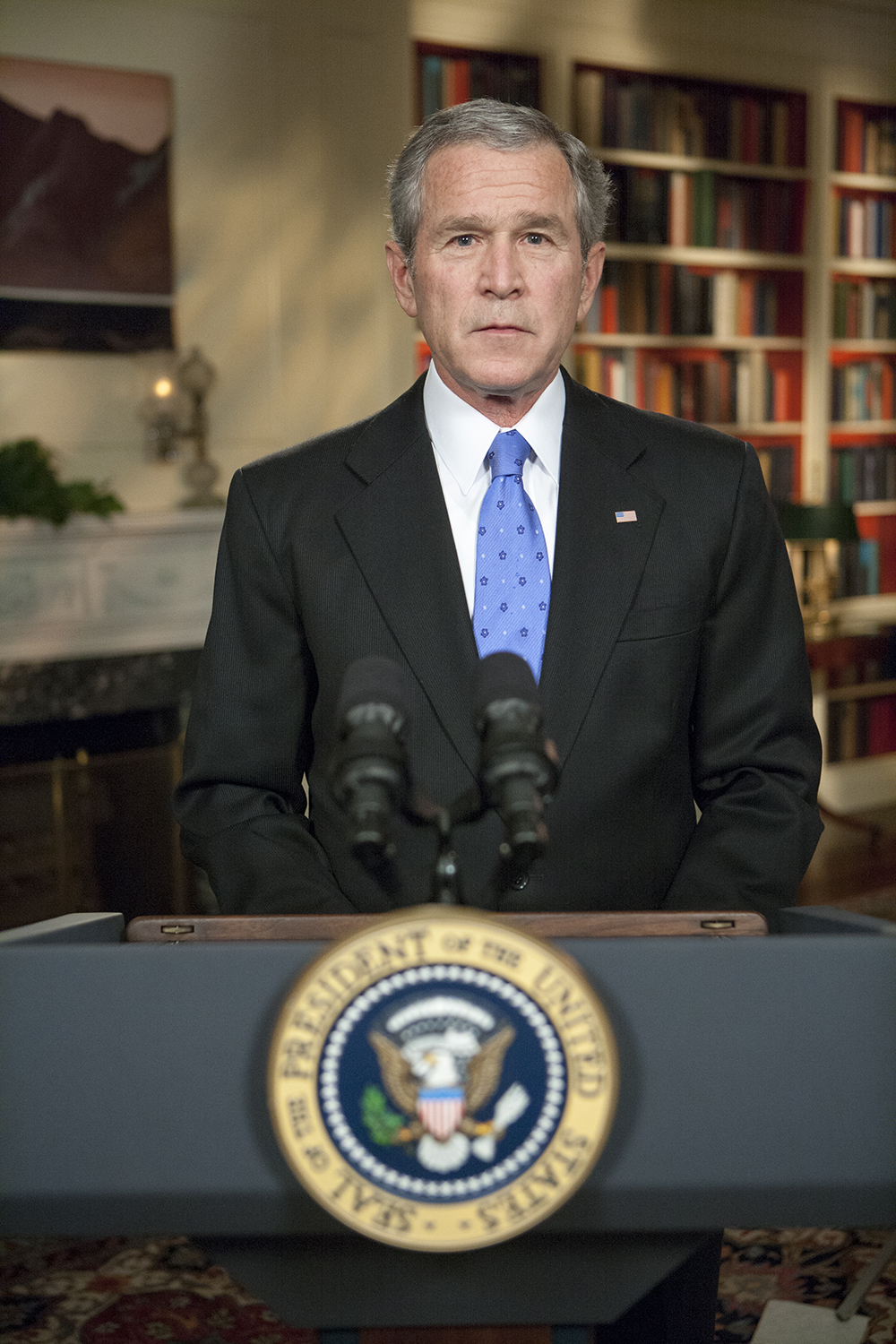
Bush during an address speech in 2007

George W. Bush's political positions have been expressed in public statements, and through his actions in the executive roles of governor of Texas and president of the United States.

== Economic policy ==
=== Fiscal policy and taxation ===
During his administration, George Bush supported enacting generous tax cuts on the model of Ronald Reagan's supply-side fiscal policies. He believed this would help the economy at large.

=== Energy policy ===
George Bush supported nuclear power and expanded domestic drilling. Bush pledged to work toward reduced reliance on foreign oil by reducing fossil fuel consumption and increasing alternative fuel production. He lifted a ban on offshore drilling in 2008, saying at the time, "This means that the only thing standing between the American people and these vast oil reserves is action from the U.S. Congress." Bush said in June 2008, "In the long run, the solution is to reduce demand for oil by promoting alternative energy technologies. My administration has worked with Congress to invest in gas-saving technologies like advanced batteries and hydrogen fuel cells... In the short run, the American economy will continue to rely largely on oil. And that means we need to increase supply, especially here at home. So my administration has repeatedly called on Congress to expand domestic oil production."

In 2008, Bush announced that the United States would commit $2 billion towards an international fund to promote clean energy technologies, saying, "along with contributions from other countries, this fund will increase and accelerate the deployment of all forms of cleaner, more efficient technologies in developing nations like India and China, and help leverage substantial private-sector capital by making clean energy projects more financially attractive."

=== Entitlement reform ===
Bush supported the privatization of Social Security by allowing individuals to set up personal retirement accounts. He also supported the expansion of Medicare to cover prescription drugs using private insurance through his Medicare Part D program.

=== Economic system and ideology ===
Bush generally supported free-market capitalism, but claimed to understand the importance of government involvement in private financial affairs to mitigate negative effects of the economy. In November 2008, Bush said, "Our aim should not be more government. It should be smarter government." Bush also embraced democratic capitalism, saying that "Democratic capitalism is the greatest system ever conceived." While he supported free-market capitalism, he also supported state interventionism and a bigger welfare state. Because of this, Bush is viewed by some as a Third Way advocate and compared to Bill Clinton. Right-libertarians from the Cato Institute have criticized Bush due his support of state interventionism while claiming to support free-market capitalism. In practice, Bush advocated for a mixture of neoliberalism and Keynesianism. Besides his tax cuts and his proposed privatization of social security, due his economic interventionism, Bush was criticized to be a socialist in terms of economics.

==== Practice ====
During the beginning of his first term, Bush enacted corporate tax cuts in the hopes that the economy would flourish as a result. Later, in 2008, Bush supported major bailout plans for mortgage lenders and automakers who were facing bankruptcy. Bush also enacted the first major economic stimulus of the 2008 Recession, which provided stimulus checks to American citizens.

=== Immigration ===
During his Presidency, Bush supported a temporary-worker program to create a legal path for foreign workers to enter the United States. He opposed amnesty for those already in the country illegally, although said he does not support deporting people that are already here. He also put a strong emphasis on secure borders and support for border patrol.

=== Trade ===
While in office, Bush was a supporter of free trade, and called on nations to reject protectionism.

=== Health care ===
Bush supported a free-market health care system, and opposed a universal health plan. In 2004, Bush planned a health care program that he said would cover as many as 10 million people lacking health insurance at a cost of $102 billion over the next decade.

== Foreign policy ==
=== Iraq War ===
On March 19, 2003, Bush ordered an invasion of Iraq, launching the Iraq War. That night, he addressed the nation, stating that his decision to invade Iraq served "to disarm Iraq, to free its people and to defend the world from grave danger". The United States and its allies charged that Saddam Hussein's government possessed weapons of mass destruction (WMDs), and thus posed a serious and imminent threat to the security of the United States and its coalition allies. This assessment was supported by the U.K. intelligence services, but not by other countries such as France, Russia and Germany. After the war, extensive searches and investigations revealed that the claimed "weapons of mass destruction" never existed; this was confirmed by the findings reported by multiple international and national commissions.

=== Axis of evil ===
In his 2002 State of the Union Address, Bush declared the nations of North Korea, Iran, and Iraq, as well as "their terrorist allies", were part of the axis of evil for their alleged support of terrorism.

=== Homeland security ===
After the attacks on the World Trade Center on September 11, 2001, President Bush founded the Department of Homeland Security. He initially opposed it, arguing that the department placed an unnecessary bureaucratic burden on the U.S. government. Bush changed his mind in June 2002, approving of the proposal; however, its creation was delayed due to disagreements in Congress over labor protection and the role of trade unions in the department. The department was created on November 25, following the passage of the Homeland Security Act.

== Civil liberties ==
=== Anti-terrorism and domestic surveillance ===
In office, Bush was a supporter of anti-terrorist surveillance and information-gathering methods. In 2001, he signed the Patriot Act into law, a piece of anti-terrorism regulation that remained in place until its expiration in March 2020.

=== Habeas corpus ===
The November 13, 2001, Presidential Military Order gave the President of the United States the power to detain suspects, suspected of connection to terrorists or terrorism as an unlawful combatant. As such, it was asserted that a person could be held indefinitely without charges being filed against him or her, without a court hearing, and without entitlement to a legal consultant. Many legal and constitutional scholars contended that these provisions were in direct opposition to habeas corpus and the United States Bill of Rights.

=== Gun policy ===
Although generally an opponent of gun control, Bush showed support for certain gun-restrictive policies. Following a shooting spree in Atlanta in July 1999, Bush announced his support for a ban on high-capacity magazines and an increase of the legal age for firearms from 18 to 21, calling these "reasonable measures." As governor of Texas, Bush initiated a program to provide Texas handgun owners with free trigger locks in May 2000, and pledged to push for the initiative on a nationwide scale if elected president. In 2003, Bush declared that he would seek a renewal of the Federal Assault Weapons Ban which was due to expire the following year, however it was later reported that he "seemed disinclined" to push for it in Congress. Bush signed the Protection of Lawful Commerce in Arms Act into law in October 2005.

== Social policy ==
=== Education: No Child Left Behind ===
President Bush proposed the No Child Left Behind Act on January 23, 2001, just three days after his first inauguration. It was coauthored by Representatives John Boehner (R-OH) and George Miller (D-CA) and Senators Edward "Ted" Kennedy (D-MA) and Judd Gregg (R-NH). The United States House of Representatives passed the bill on May 23, 2001 (voting 384–45), and the United States Senate passed it on June 14, 2001 (voting 91–8). President Bush signed it into law on January 8, 2002.

=== Abortion ===
In office, Bush maintained a strong anti-abortion and pro-life stance, consistently opposing abortion while supporting parental notification for minor girls who want abortions, the Mexico City Policy, a ban on intact dilation and extraction (commonly known as partial-birth abortion), adoption tax credits, and the Unborn Victims of Violence Act. While running for Congress in 1978, Bush said that the decision to have an abortion should be a woman's personal decision, but he declared that he was anti-abortion in 1994.

=== Death penalty ===
Bush supported the death penalty. As Governor of Texas, he allowed 152 executions. He commuted the sentence of one prisoner on death row, Henry Lee Lucas, on June 15, 1998.

=== Environment ===
Bush opposed the Kyoto Protocol, saying that the treaty neglected and exempted 80 percent of the world's population and would have cost tens of billions of dollars per year. Bush announced the Clear Skies Act of 2003, aimed at amending the Clean Air Act to reduce air pollution through the use of emissions trading programs. The initiative was introduced to Congress, but failed to make it out of committee.

Bush said that global warming is real and noted that it is a serious problem, but asserted there is a "debate over whether it's manmade or naturally caused". He announced plans to reaffirm the United States' commitment to work with major economies, and, through the United Nations, to complete an international agreement that will slow, stop, and eventually reverse the growth of greenhouse gases; he stated, "this agreement will be effective only if it includes commitments by every major economy and gives none a free ride."

=== LGBT issues ===
Bush opposed same-sex marriage. During his 2004 reelection campaign, he called for an amendment to the U.S. Constitution that would ban same-sex marriage in the United States but allow for the possibility of civil unions on the state level. He also stated in the famous Wead tapes that he would not "kick gays" and worried his refusal to do so might upset his evangelical supporters, and that "I think it is bad for Republicans to be kicking gays."

=== Prayer in public schools ===
Bush supported "voluntary, student-led prayer" but not "teacher-led prayers."

=== Stem cell research ===
Bush opposed federal funding for research relating to newly derived embryonic stem cell lines. He supported federal funding for research on pre-existing embryonic stem cell lines.

== See also ==
- You're either with us, or against us
