= Gary Bauer =

American politician and activist (born 1946)

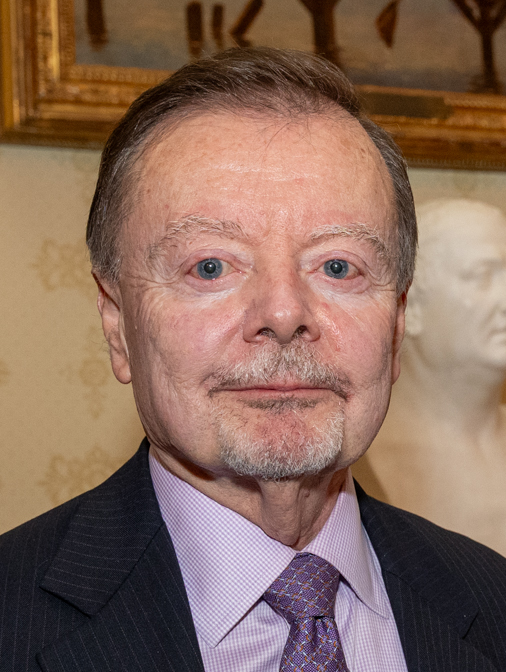
- Bauer in 2025

Member of the United States Commission on International Religious Freedom
- In office May 2018 – May 2021
- Appointed by: Donald Trump

2nd President of the Family Research Council
- In office 1988–1999
- Preceded by: Gerald P. Regier
- Succeeded by: Kenneth L. Connor

Assistant to the President for Policy Development
- In office 1987–1988
- President: Ronald Reagan
- Preceded by: John A. Svahn
- Succeeded by: Franmarie Kennedy-Keel

United States Under Secretary of Education
- In office 1985–1987
- President: Ronald Reagan
- Preceded by: Gary L. Jones
- Succeeded by: Linus D. Wright

United States Deputy Under Secretary of Education for Planning and Budget
- In office 1982–1985
- President: Ronald Reagan
- Preceded by: Gary L. Jones
- Succeeded by: Bruce M. Carnes

Personal details
- Born: Gary Lee Bauer; May 4, 1946 (age 80) Covington, Kentucky, U.S.
- Party: Republican
- Education: Georgetown College (BA); Georgetown University (JD)
- Occupation: Politician

Gary Lee Bauer (born May 4, 1946) is an American civil servant, activist, and former political candidate. He served in President Ronald Reagan's administration as Under Secretary of Education and Chief Domestic Policy Advisor, and later became president of the Family Research Council and a senior vice president of Focus on the Family, both conservative Christian organizations. Bauer was a candidate in the 2000 Republican Party presidential primaries and participated in five national debates. He is known for his advocacy of religious liberty, support for Israel, and his dedication to electing conservative candidates to Congress.

Currently, Bauer is president of the advocacy organization American Values. In May 2018, President Donald Trump appointed him to the United States Commission on International Religious Freedom.

== Background ==
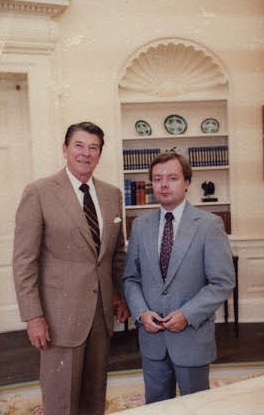
Bauer with President Ronald Reagan in 1982

Gary Bauer was born in Covington, Kentucky, and was reared in Newport, Kentucky, in a working-class family, the son of Elizabeth "Betty" (Gossett) and Stanley Rynolds Bauer, a laborer. He was reared in the Southern Baptist faith. Of his hometown, Bauer has said, "in the years I grew up there, the town was literally under the control of an organized crime syndicate out of Toledo, Ohio. And when I say under the control of it, literally the mayor, the city council, even the police department were all being paid handsomely." Bauer cited the community's efforts to oppose this corruption as a significant influence on his political conservatism.

Bauer received a bachelor's degree from Georgetown College in Georgetown, Kentucky, in 1968 and a J.D. degree from Georgetown University in Washington, D.C., in 1973. While attending law school, he worked as the assistant director of Opposition Research at the Republican National Committee from 1969 to 1973. He then took a position as the director of government relations for the Direct Mail Marketing Association, from 1973 to 1980. He served as a Deputy Under Secretary for Planning and Budget in the United States Department of Education, from 1982 to 1987, and as an advisor on domestic policy from 1987 to 1988. While serving under Reagan, he was named Chairman of President Reagan's Special Working Group on the Family. His report, "The Family: Preserving America's Future," was presented to the President in December 1986.

Bauer served as the president of the Family Research Council from 1988 to 1999. He resigned from this position to run for the Republican Party nomination for President of the United States. He left the race after the primaries in February 2000. In 1996, he founded the Campaign for Working Families (CWF), a political action committee dedicated to electing "pro-family, pro-life and pro-free enterprise" candidates to federal and state offices. In addition to serving as the chairman of CWF, Bauer is also the president of American Values, a non-profit organization "committed to defending life, traditional marriage, and equipping our children with" conservative values. He also serves on the executive board of Christians United for Israel, a lobby group headed by John Hagee. Gary Bauer was one of the signers of the Statement of Principles of Project for the New American Century (PNAC) on June 3, 1997. He also serves on the board of the Emergency Committee for Israel.

Bauer currently serves as the president of American Values (conservative values advocacy organization). At the end of May 2018, Bauer was appointed by President Trump to the United States Commission on International Religious Freedom.

Bauer is married to the former Carol Hoke, and lives in Virginia. Gary and Carol have three adult children.

== Political positions ==
Bauer has been described as a "politically conservative Baptist with strong commitments to preserving the traditional family and the Judeo-Christian values he believes are the foundation of American society." Bauer is anti-abortion. He is in support of repealing laws that allow abortion. He advocates for the Supreme Court's overturn of Roe v. Wade as the first step in the anti-abortion cause. He wants to cut funding for Planned Parenthood and do away with any U.S. aid for organizations that provide or advise abortions. Bauer also says that he would counsel raped family members against abortion. He points to the Constitution and the Christian view of human life as reasons for not supporting euthanasia, stating that, "all people have immeasurable value because they have been created in the image and likeness of God." He is a supporter of the death penalty for death row inmates. Bauer opposes cloning and embryonic stem cell research, but supports adult stem cell research. He supports a Constitutional amendment to ban same-sex marriage, and prefers abstinence programs to comprehensive sex education programs. Bauer wants to remove from the tax code all economic disincentives to marry.

On foreign policy issues, Bauer supports strong ties with Israel, would not trade with China until the country improves its human rights record, and supported full funding for the Iraq War. Bauer believes that America should advance and protect freedom worldwide and "bring the message of freedom to the Arab world". He is a critic of Islam.

Bauer supports enforcing all laws against illegal immigration and that all immigrants should learn English and U.S. traditions.

On economic issues, Bauer supports income tax cuts and decreased regulation of small businesses. He thinks that government should not set a minimum wage. He has stated that corporations should serve the U.S. as well as their shareholders, and has occasionally been critical of the World Trade Organization.

== Presidential campaign ==
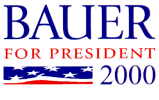
2000 campaign logo

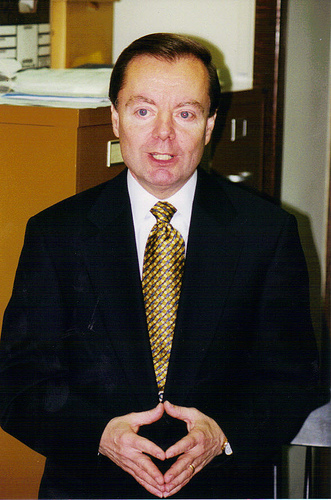
Bauer in Concord, New Hampshire, campaigning for the 2000 Republican presidential nomination

Bauer announced his presidential campaign in April 1999, running on a platform built mostly upon social issues such as abortion. Bauer received over 8% of the vote in the Iowa Republican caucuses, and less than 1% of the vote in the New Hampshire Republican primary before withdrawing from the race for the Republican presidential nomination. Bauer endorsed John McCain when he pulled out of the race in February 2000. In the fall of 1999, two senior members of Bauer's campaign staff raised questions about closed-door meetings between Bauer and a female campaign aide. Bauer's denial of any impropriety prompted two campaign workers to resign. There was never any actual evidence of infidelity brought against Bauer.

His presidential campaign is mostly remembered for an incident at the Bisquick Pancake Presidential Primary Flip-Off on January 31, 2000. The candidates each took a turn to mount a four-foot stage, make, flip and catch a pancake in a pan. When Bauer took his turn, he tossed his pancake too high and, trying to follow it, fell off the back of the stage, disappearing through a blue curtain. He emerged, unhurt, with no pancake and no pan. He then flipped and caught a pancake without falling on his second attempt. Bauer joked that it might be the best thing to happen to his campaign and said that he was "the Ken Griffey of the presidential candidates. I dove into the dugout to catch my pancake." Years later, Bauer recalled that as he toppled off the stage and through the curtain, fellow candidate George W. Bush, who was standing backstage having already successfully completed his pancake toss, shouted "here comes Bauer!"

== Media activities ==
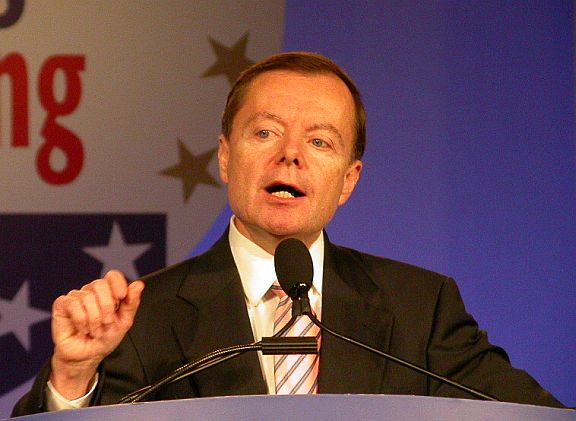
Bauer speaking at the Values Voters conference in 2007

Bauer co-hosted a talk radio show with former Jerusalem Post CEO and President Tom Rose from March 2006 to March 2007 on WMET, a Washington, D.C. metropolitan area radio station. Bauer is also a frequent guest on many conservative talk-radio programs across the country. Gary and Tom were co-hosts on SiriusXM Patriot Channel 125 Bauer and Rose Show for 9 years and their popular show ended April 9, 2017 with Tom Rose taking a position in the White House as assistant and adviser to Vice President Pence.

== Manhattan Declaration ==
In November 2009, Bauer signed an ecumenical statement known as the Manhattan Declaration calling on evangelical, Catholic and Orthodox Christians not to comply with rules and laws which they claim would compel participation in or blessing of abortion, same-sex marriage and other matters that go against their religious consciences.

== Publications ==
Bauer is the author of several books, including:

- Our hopes, our dreams: a vision for America. Focus on the Family Pub. January 1996. ISBN 978-1-56179-433-1.
- Doing Things Right. Word Pub. August 1, 2001. ISBN 978-0-8499-1684-7.
- Children at Risk. Thomas Nelson Incorporated. July 1, 1994. ISBN 978-0-8499-3584-8. (with James C. Dobson)
- Our journey home. Word Pub. September 1, 1992. ISBN 978-0-8499-0931-3.
