= 2000 New Hampshire Republican presidential primary =

2000 United States Republican presidential primary in New Hampshire

- February 1, 2000

17 pledged Republican National Convention delegates
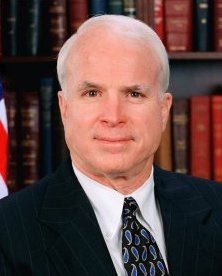

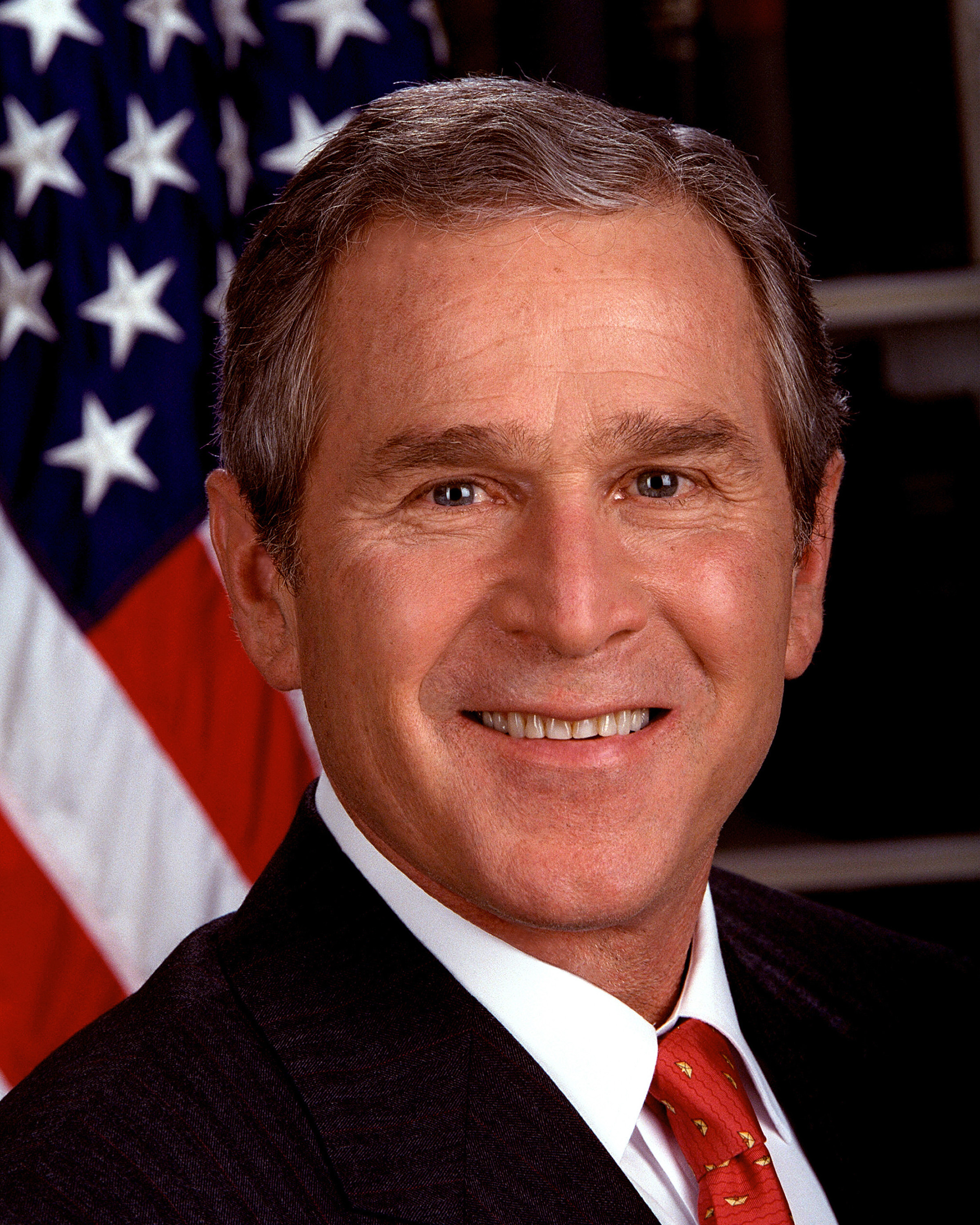

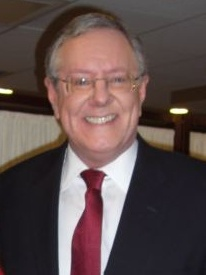

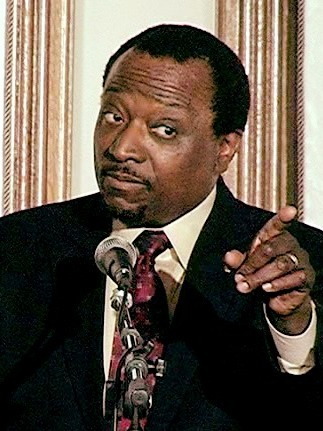
Nominee	John McCain	George W. Bush
Home state	Arizona	Texas
Delegate count	10	5
Popular vote	115,606	72,330
Percentage	48.53%	30.36%
Nominee	Steve Forbes	Alan Keyes
Home state	New York	Maryland
Delegate count	2	0
Popular vote	30,166	15,179
Percentage	12.66%	6.37%
- County results McCain: McCain 40-50% McCain 50-60%

The 2000 New Hampshire Republican presidential primary took place on February 1, 2000. New Hampshire traditionally served as the second state in a presidential primary cycle, after the Iowa. Senator John McCain of Arizona who had diverted resources from Iowa to focus on securing victory in New Hampshire, won a surprising victory, defeating the frontrunner for the Republican nomination, Governor George W. Bush of Texas.

== Background ==
=== Historical context ===
New Hampshire's presidential primary had served as a crucial early test for presidential candidates since 1920. The state's traditional position following the Iowa caucuses had created a unique political environment where retail politics dominated, requiring candidates to engage in intimate town hall meetings and direct voter interactions. This tradition would prove particularly significant in the 2000 campaign.

=== Pre-primary campaign ===
The 2000 primary field featured several prominent Republican candidates, led by Texas Governor George W. Bush, who entered the race with substantial financial resources and broad establishment support. As the son of former President George H. W. Bush, he carried both the advantages and potential drawbacks of his family name. Senator John McCain positioned himself as a maverick reformer, while publishing executive Steve Forbes returned for a second campaign after his 1996 bid. The field also included former diplomat Alan Keyes and social conservative activist Gary Bauer.

McCain's campaign strategy centered on his "Straight Talk Express" bus tour, which became the defining symbol of his New Hampshire campaign. During his intensive focus on the state, McCain conducted more than 114 town hall meetings, a stark contrast to Bush's 36 days of campaigning in the state. McCain's emphasis on campaign finance reform, government reform, and his compelling biography as a Vietnam War veteran and former prisoner of war resonated strongly with New Hampshire voters.

== Campaign dynamics ==
=== Strategy and messaging ===
The McCain campaign's emphasis on direct voter engagement through the "Straight Talk Express" created a media phenomenon that transformed the race. Reporters received unprecedented access to the candidate, leading to extensive favorable coverage that helped shape McCain's image as an authentic, accessible candidate. The constant media presence on his campaign bus created a narrative of transparency and openness that contrasted with the more controlled environment of the Bush campaign.

Bush's campaign stressed his record as Texas governor and promoted his "compassionate conservative" platform, emphasizing tax cuts, education reform, and social conservative values. However, his decision to skip two in-state debates and his relatively limited public appearances in New Hampshire would later be cited as crucial strategic errors. The presence of his father on the campaign trail, while intended to showcase family strength, inadvertently reinforced criticisms that he was overly reliant on his family's political legacy.

== Opinion polling ==
Poll source	Date(s)	Sample size	John McCain (R)	George W. Bush (R)	Steve Forbes (R)	Other / undecided (Note: Calculated by taking the difference of 100% and all other listed candidates combined. For polls that do not report a figure for Forbes, this includes his support.)
Gallup	January 31, 2000	888	44%	32%	13%	11%
University of New Hampshire Survey Center	January 31, 2000	400	41%	34%	13%	12%
Zogby Analytics	January 31, 2000	813	41%	31%	—	28%
American Research Group	January 30, 2000	600	36%	38%	16%	10%
Hart Research Associates/Public Opinion Strategies	January 30, 2000	502 (Note: Average of multiple versions or turnout models listed in the poll; the source dataset gives the sample size as 501.5.)	38%	32%	12%	18%
KRC Research	January 30, 2000	400	38%	34%	—	28%
Zogby Analytics	January 30, 2000	600	39%	34%	13%	14%
CBS News/The New York Times	January 29, 2000	450	39%	35%	10%	16%
Franklin Pierce University	January 29, 2000	506	40%	29%	15%	16%
Quinnipiac University	January 29, 2000	606	39%	29%	—	32%
RKM Research and Communications Inc.	January 29, 2000	412	39%	31%	11%	19%
SurveyUSA	January 29, 2000	881	41%	35%	—	24%
University of Massachusetts	January 29, 2000	400	37%	28%	15%	20%
Gallup	January 28, 2000	600 (Note: Sample size unavailable; 600 is a default estimate used in the source dataset.)	39%	34%	15%	12%
KRC Research	January 28, 2000	400	37%	36%	—	27%
Mason-Dixon Polling & Strategy	January 28, 2000	428	36%	35%	15%	14%
Yankelovich Partners Inc.	January 28, 2000	500	39%	37%	—	24%
American Research Group	January 27, 2000	600	36%	34%	17%	13%
University of New Hampshire Survey Center	January 27, 2000	400	41%	33%	16%	10%
Zogby Analytics	January 27, 2000	600	38%	32%	12%	18%
CBS News/The New York Times	January 26, 2000	397	36%	31%	15%	18%
KRC Research	January 26, 2000	400	36%	31%	—	33%
Dartmouth College	January 25, 2000	436	37%	34%	15%	14%
Franklin Pierce University	January 25, 2000	447	38%	30%	13%	19%
Gallup	January 25, 2000	589	40%	35%	14%	11%
RKM Research and Communications Inc.	January 25, 2000	404	32%	27%	16%	25%

== Results ==
Primary results
Candidate	Votes	Percentage	Delegates
John McCain	115,606	48.53%	10
George W. Bush	72,330	30.36%	5
Steve Forbes	30,166	12.66%	2
Alan Keyes	15,179	6.37%	0
Gary Bauer	566	0.69%	0
Total	237,640	100%	17

== Analysis ==
McCain's victory marked the largest margin in the New Hampshire primary since Ronald Reagan's win in the 1980 campaign and represented a significant setback for the Bush campaign. Exit polling revealed that McCain dominated among independent voters, securing more than sixty percent of their support. These independent voters constituted forty percent of the primary electorate. Perhaps more surprisingly, McCain achieved parity with Bush among registered Republicans, a voting bloc the Bush campaign had considered their reliable base.

The demographic breakdown showed McCain's particular strength among moderate voters, while Bush maintained an advantage with conservatives, though not by a sufficient margin to overcome McCain's broader coalition. Veterans and higher-education voters showed particular enthusiasm for McCain's candidacy, responding to his military service and reform message.

Bush campaign officials attributed their defeat primarily to McCain's strategic decision to concentrate resources in New Hampshire while largely bypassing Iowa. Internal campaign assessments also suggested that Governor Bush's appearances with his father, former President George H. W. Bush, may have backfired by emphasizing dynasty politics over individual merit. The Voter News Service analysis showed that Bush's decision to skip two candidate debates had damaged his standing with local voters who traditionally expect significant personal attention from presidential candidates.

== Aftermath ==
The Bush campaign responded to their New Hampshire defeat by pivoting to a more aggressive strategy focused on the upcoming South Carolina primary. This strategic shift would include a stronger emphasis on Bush's evangelical Christian faith and the deployment of more confrontational campaign tactics. The campaign also intensified its ground operations and voter outreach efforts in upcoming Southern primary states.

Gary Bauer, following his disappointing showing in both Iowa and New Hampshire, withdrew from the race and endorsed John McCain, though this would prove insufficient to maintain McCain's momentum in later contests. The endorsement highlighted growing divisions within the social conservative movement, as other prominent conservatives, including Pat Robertson and Jerry Falwell, aligned with Bush.

The primary results triggered a significant shift in campaign fundraising patterns. McCain's victory led to a surge in small-dollar donations through his newly established online platform, while Bush relied increasingly on his network of PAC supporters and traditional party donors.

Despite McCain's commanding victory in New Hampshire and a subsequent win in Michigan, Bush would eventually secure the Republican nomination through strong performances in the Southern primaries and support from the party establishment. Bush went on to win the presidency in the highly contested general election against Democratic nominee Al Gore.

The aftermath of the New Hampshire primary also influenced the Democratic contest, as Bill Bradley's narrow loss to Al Gore in the concurrent Democratic primary effectively ended his chances of securing his party's nomination. The dual primaries highlighted New Hampshire's continuing role as a crucial early test in presidential politics, capable of both validating frontrunners and enabling surprising insurgent victories.

== Legacy ==
The 2000 New Hampshire primary has become a case study in the importance of retail politics and the potential vulnerability of establishment frontrunners in early primary states. McCain's "Straight Talk Express" established a new standard for media access in presidential campaigns, though few candidates have since attempted to replicate its open-access model. The primary also demonstrated the continuing significance of independent voters in New Hampshire's open primary system, a factor that continues to influence campaign strategies in subsequent election cycles.

== See also ==
- 2000 United States presidential election
- 2000 Republican Party presidential primaries
- 2000 South Carolina Republican presidential primary
- 2000 New Hampshire Democratic presidential primary
