= 2000 South Carolina Republican presidential primary =

2000 U.S. primary election

- February 19, 2000
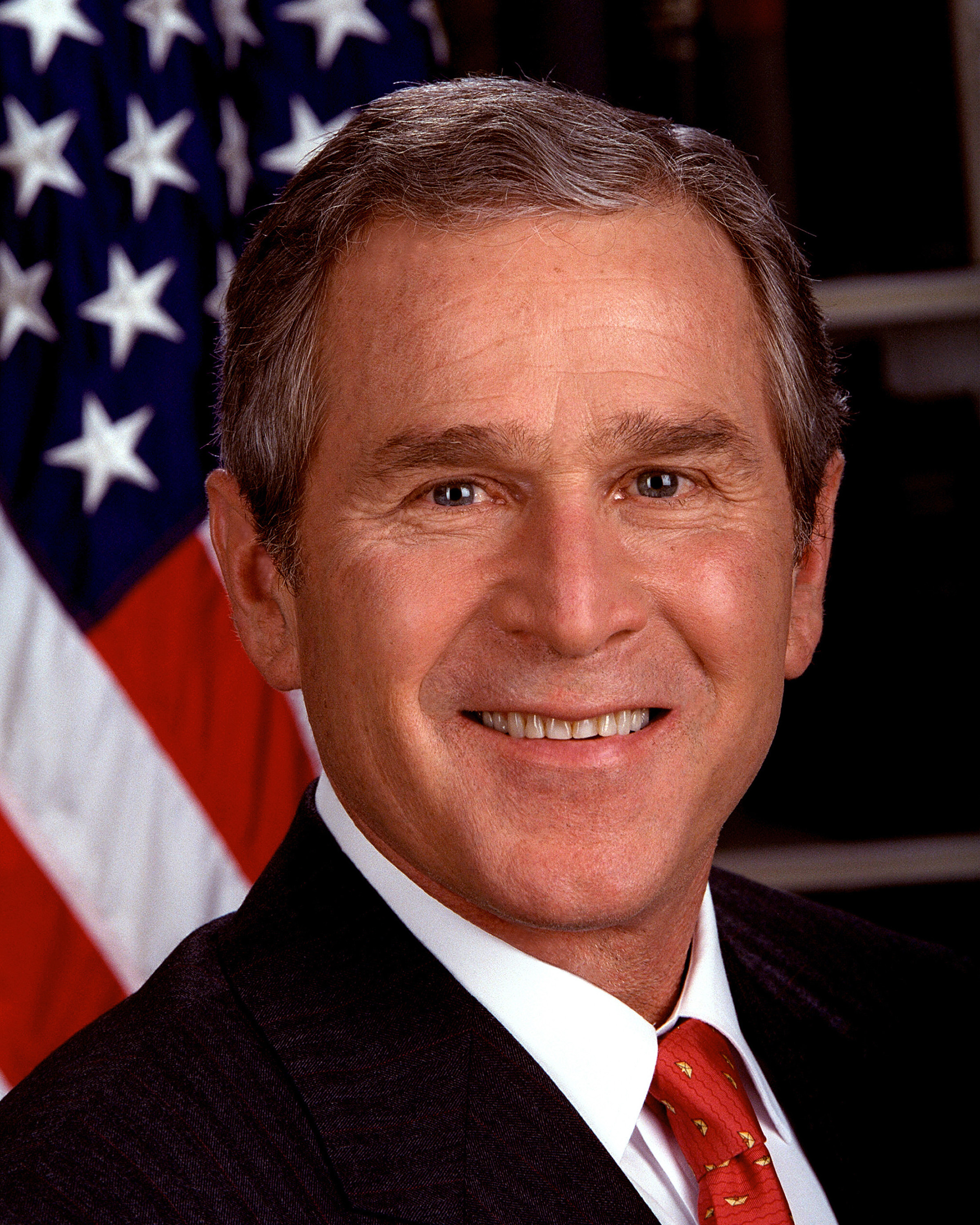

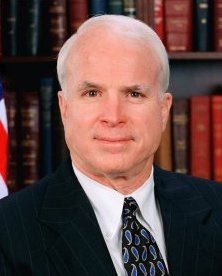

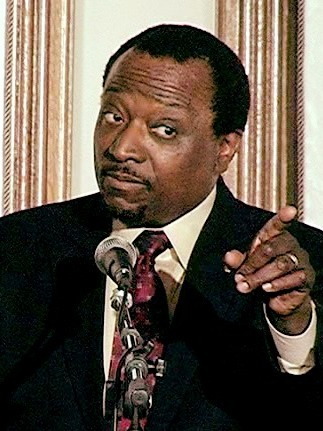
Candidate	George W. Bush	John McCain	Alan Keyes
Home state	Texas	Arizona	Maryland
Delegate count	34	3
Popular vote	305,998	239,964	25,996
Percentage	53.39%	41.87%	4.54%

The 2000 South Carolina Republican primary was held on February 19, 2000, to elect 37 delegates to the 2000 Republican National Convention. Texas governor George W. Bush defeated Arizona senator John McCain, winning 34 of 37 delegates and taking over 53 percent of the popular vote. South Carolina proved to be a crucially important state for Bush on his way to the Republican nomination; after McCain had surprised him in the New Hampshire primary three weeks earlier. The South Carolina primary was noted for its aggressiveness and viciousness, with McCain subject to attacks from anonymous phone calls questioning his patriotism and suggesting that his adopted daughter, who was born in Bangladesh, was an illegitimate child.

== Background ==
Governor George W. Bush of Texas entered the primary as the presumptive frontrunner and establishment favorite. His campaign emphasized his record of bipartisan governance in Texas, his proposal for extensive tax cuts, and his plans for education reform. Bush's message of "compassionate conservatism" sought to broaden the Republican Party's appeal while maintaining its conservative base.

Arizona senator John McCain of Arizona campaigned as a maverick reformer, emphasizing his military service and commitment to campaign finance reform. Alan Keyes focused his campaign on social conservative issues and moral values, though he struggled to gain significant traction against the two leading candidates.

The 2000 South Carolina Republican primary represented a critical juncture in the 2000 Republican nomination process. Following McCain's stunning victory in the New Hampshire primary, the Bush campaign viewed South Carolina, the first Southern state on the primary calendar, as an essential battleground. The conservative electorate, combined with its substantial military presence and influential Southern Baptist community, made it an ideal battleground between Bush's establishment conservative appeal and McCain's reformist message and military background.

The primary also took place against the backdrop of growing national debates over campaign finance reform, which had become McCain's signature issue, and the role of the Christian right in Republican politics.

== Candidates ==
- George W. Bush, governor of Texas and son of George H. W. Bush
- Alan Keyes, former U.S. assistant secretary of state for international organization affairs and candidate for president in 1996
- John McCain, U.S. senator from Arizona

=== Withdrew ===
- Gary Bauer, former U.S. under secretary of education (suspended campaign February 4)
- Steve Forbes, publisher of Forbes magazine and candidate for president in 1996 (suspended campaign February 7)
- Orrin Hatch, U.S. senator from Utah (suspended campaign January 26)

== Campaign ==
=== Strategy and tactics ===
The primary campaign was characterized by intense strategic maneuvering from both leading campaigns. The Bush team, led by strategist Karl Rove, focused on mobilizing the state's substantial evangelical Christian base while emphasizing Bush's record as Texas governor and his promise of "Compassionate conservatism." The campaign established a robust ground operation and secured endorsements from many of the state's prominent Republican leaders.

McCain's campaign attempted to replicate their New Hampshire success by appealing to the state's large veteran population, drawing on McCain's background as a Vietnam War veteran and POW. His campaign also sought to attract independent voters and reform-minded Republicans with his message of campaign finance reform and government accountability. The campaign organized extensively around military bases and in the more moderate coastal regions of the state. His campaign particularly resonated with the state's large population of military personnel and veterans, especially around bases such as Fort Jackson and MCAS Beaufort.

=== Controversies ===
The primary became notorious for its aggressive campaign tactics and negative messaging. Anonymous push poll phone calls circulated throughout the state questioning McCain's personal life and patriotism. Particularly controversial were rumors spread about McCain's adopted daughter from Bangladesh, which falsely suggested he had fathered an illegitimate child.

The ongoing debate over the Modern display of the Confederate flag at the South Carolina State House became another contentious issue. Both candidates faced criticism for their carefully worded positions on the flag's display, attempting to balance competing political interests. The issue highlighted the complex racial and cultural dynamics still at play in South Carolina politics.

Questions about Bush's service in the Texas Air National Guard during the Vietnam War also emerged as a campaign issue, though they gained limited traction among the state's conservative voters.

== Endorsements ==
The battle for endorsements reflected the broader ideological divide within the state's Republican establishment. Bush secured support from Governor Jim Hodges and longtime Senator Strom Thurmond, representing the traditional conservative establishment. The endorsement of prominent religious right figures, including several megachurch pastors from the Upstate region, bolstered Bush's credentials with evangelical voters.

McCain countered with endorsements from former Governor Carroll Campbell and Representative Mark Sanford, both known for their reform-minded approach to governance. His campaign also highlighted support from several retired military leaders, reinforcing his appeal to the state's substantial veteran population.

== Polling ==
Public polling throughout the primary campaign showed a gradually tightening race. Initial surveys gave Bush a commanding lead, but after McCain won New Hampshire, polls tightened significantly, with some showing him ahead.

The final weeks saw particularly volatile polling numbers, with Bush's initial twenty-point lead shrinking to single digits in some surveys. The Zogby tracking poll showed particular movement among independent voters and military veterans, two key constituencies that would prove crucial to the final outcome.

Poll source	Date(s)	Sample size	Margin of error	George W. Bush (R)	John McCain (R)	Other / undecided (Note: Calculated by taking the difference of 100% and all other candidates combined.)
Gallup	February 17, 2000	563	—	52%	40%	8%
SurveyUSA	February 16, 2000	500	—	42%	42%	16%
Zogby Analytics	February 16, 2000	600	—	43%	42%	15%
Hart Research Associates/Public Opinion Strategies	February 15, 2000	639	—	44%	38%	18%
Mason-Dixon Polling & Strategy	February 15, 2000	600	—	45%	42%	13%
Rasmussen Reports	February 15, 2000	600	—	47%	35%	18%
Vox Populi Communications	February 15, 2000	500	—	44%	36%	20%
American Research Group	February 14, 2000	627	—	47%	41%	12%
Gallup	February 12, 2000	552	—	49%	42%	9%
Los Angeles Times	February 12, 2000	1,047	—	42%	40%	18%
American Research Group	February 10, 2000	600	—	46%	39%	15%
Princeton Survey Research Associates International	February 10, 2000	500	—	43%	40%	17%
ABC News/The Washington Post	February 5, 2000	490	—	48%	43%	9%
Yankelovich Partners Inc.	February 5, 2000	515	—	40%	44%	16%
American Research Group	February 3, 2000	600	—	42%	45%	13%
Rasmussen Reports	February 2, 2000	600	—	41%	40%	19%
Zogby Analytics	February 2, 2000	400	—	39%	44%	17%
	February 1, 2000	McCain wins the New Hampshire primary				
	January 24, 2000	Bush wins the Iowa caucuses				

== Results ==
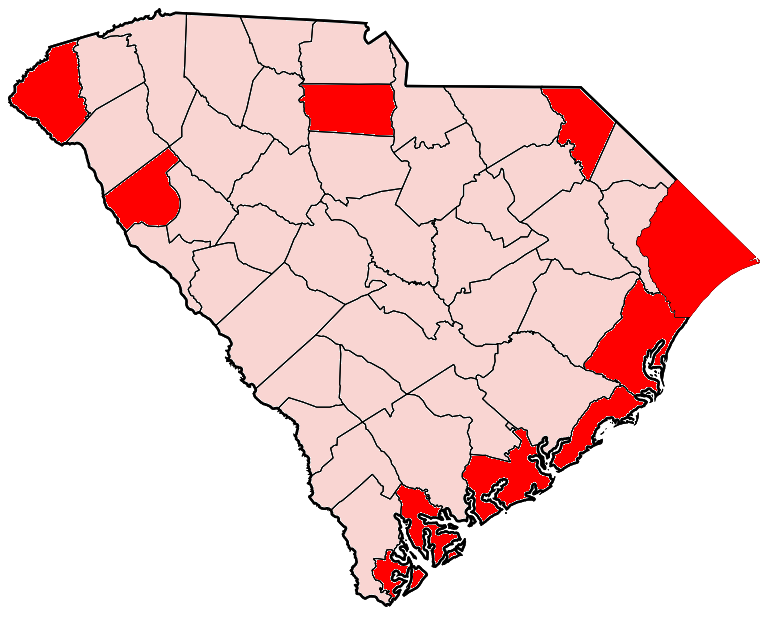
2000 South Carolina Primary county Map George W. Bush John McCain

The primary results revealed clear geographic and demographic divisions within the Republican electorate. Bush's victory margin of 11.5 percentage points exceeded late polling predictions and demonstrated the enduring strength of traditional conservative coalition-building in Southern Republican politics.

Candidate	Votes	Percentage	Delegates
George W. Bush	305,998	53.39%	34
John McCain	239,964	41.87%	3
Alan Keyes	25,996	4.54%	0
Other	1,144	0.20%	0
Total	573,101	100%	37

=== Regional analysis ===
The Upstate region, centered around Greenville and Spartanburg, provided Bush with his strongest support. This traditionally conservative region, home to a high concentration of evangelical Christians and Bob Jones University, delivered substantial margins that proved decisive in the overall result.

The Midlands region, including the state capital of Columbia, showed a more competitive race. Bush's organization proved effective in turning out traditional Republican voters, while McCain's appeal to military personnel around Fort Jackson helped him remain competitive.

In the Lowcountry, particularly around Charleston, McCain performed well among moderate Republicans and independents. The region's more moderate political climate and significant military presence provided fertile ground for McCain's message, though it wasn't enough to overcome Bush's advantages elsewhere.

== Impact and aftermath ==
The South Carolina primary proved decisive in shaping the remainder of the 2000 Republican nomination contest. Bush's victory effectively halted McCain's momentum from New Hampshire and established a pattern that would repeat itself across the South. The win reinforced Bush's status as the favorite of the Republican establishment and demonstrated his ability to unite different factions of the party's conservative base.

In the immediate aftermath, McCain's campaign struggled to regain its footing. His criticism of certain religious right leaders in Virginia days after the South Carolina loss further complicated his path forward in Southern states. The primary's outcome also influenced the tone of subsequent contests, with increased focus on social issues and questions of conservative authenticity.

The controversial tactics employed during the primary sparked significant debate within the Republican Party about campaign practices and the role of state parties in the nomination process. Several reform proposals emerged, though few significant changes were ultimately implemented for future primary cycles.

== Legacy ==
The 2000 South Carolina Republican primary has become a frequently cited example in discussions of modern campaign tactics and primary politics. Political scientists and campaign strategists often reference it when analyzing the role of state-level contests in presidential nominations and the importance of coalition-building within the Republican Party.

The primary's impact on campaign finance reform efforts proved significant. McCain's experience in South Carolina helped fuel his subsequent partnership with Senator Russ Feingold on what would become the Bipartisan Campaign Reform Act of 2002, though the legislation did not address many of the campaign practices that proved controversial in South Carolina.

The contest also influenced future Republican presidential campaigns in South Carolina. Subsequent candidates have studied the Bush campaign's successful coalition-building strategy, particularly its ability to unite economic conservatives, evangelical Christians, and military veterans. The primary remains a crucial test for Republican presidential hopefuls, with campaigns frequently employing staff and consultants with experience from the 2000 race.

== See also ==
- 2000 Republican Party presidential primaries
- George W. Bush 2000 presidential campaign
- John McCain 2000 presidential campaign
- South Carolina primary
- Southern strategy
- Solid South
