= Iowa caucuses =

United States electoral event

The Iowa caucuses are quadrennial electoral events for the Democratic and Republican parties in the U.S. state of Iowa. Unlike primary elections, where registered voters cast ballots at polling places on election day, Iowa caucuses are meetings where voters gather to discuss and select candidates for their registered party. Political parties hold the caucuses, in contrast to most state-run primaries. Both presidential and midterm elections in Iowa use caucuses. The caucuses are also held to select delegates to county conventions and party committees, among other party activities.

The Iowa caucuses are noteworthy as the first major contest of the United States presidential primary season. Although caucus-goers have been unrepresentative of the nation's overall demographic, caucuses are still seen by some as a strong indicator of how a presidential candidate will do in later contests. Candidates who do poorly in the Iowa caucus frequently drop out in the following days.

The 2020 Iowa Republican caucuses and the 2020 Iowa Democratic caucuses took place on February 3, 2020. The Democratic caucus proved controversial after difficulties and errors in the reporting of the final vote totals. Iowa Democratic Party Chair Troy Price resigned on February 12, 2020, over the chaos resulting from the caucus.

On February 4, 2023, the Democratic National Committee approved a new calendar for the 2024 Democratic Party presidential primaries, moving the South Carolina Democratic primary to be held first on February 3, and pushing the Iowa Democratic caucuses later to March. The Republican National Committee still announced plans to hold the Iowa Republican caucuses first in the 2024 Republican Party presidential primaries. By October 6, the Democratic National Committee reached a compromise in which the in-person Iowa Democratic caucuses focusing on party business could still be held in January, but voting on presidential candidates would be done via mail-in ballots until Super Tuesday, March 5.

== Background ==
Political parties in Iowa have used caucuses to select party leaders and candidates for office since the 1800s. Before 1907, parties selected all candidates for political office through the caucus system. Iowa held a presidential primary in 1916, but returned to the caucus system in 1917 due to high costs and low participation.

After the 1968 Democratic National Convention protest activity, Democratic Party leaders decided to make changes to their presidential nomination process by spreading out the schedule in each state. Because Iowa had a complex process of precinct caucuses, county conventions, district conventions, and a state convention, they chose to start early. In 1972, Iowa was the first state to hold its Democratic caucus, and it had the first Republican caucus four years later.

Under Iowa law, political parties are required to hold caucuses every two years to select delegates to county conventions and party committees.

For Republicans, the Iowa caucus used to follow the Iowa Straw Poll in August of the preceding year. The Iowa Straw Poll was held six times, beginning in 1979, but only three Straw Poll winners went on to win the caucus the following year. The Straw Poll was discontinued in June 2015.

With an emphasis on retail politics, candidates have often pursued the "full Grassley" or Iowa 99, as they visit all of the counties of the state.

== Process ==
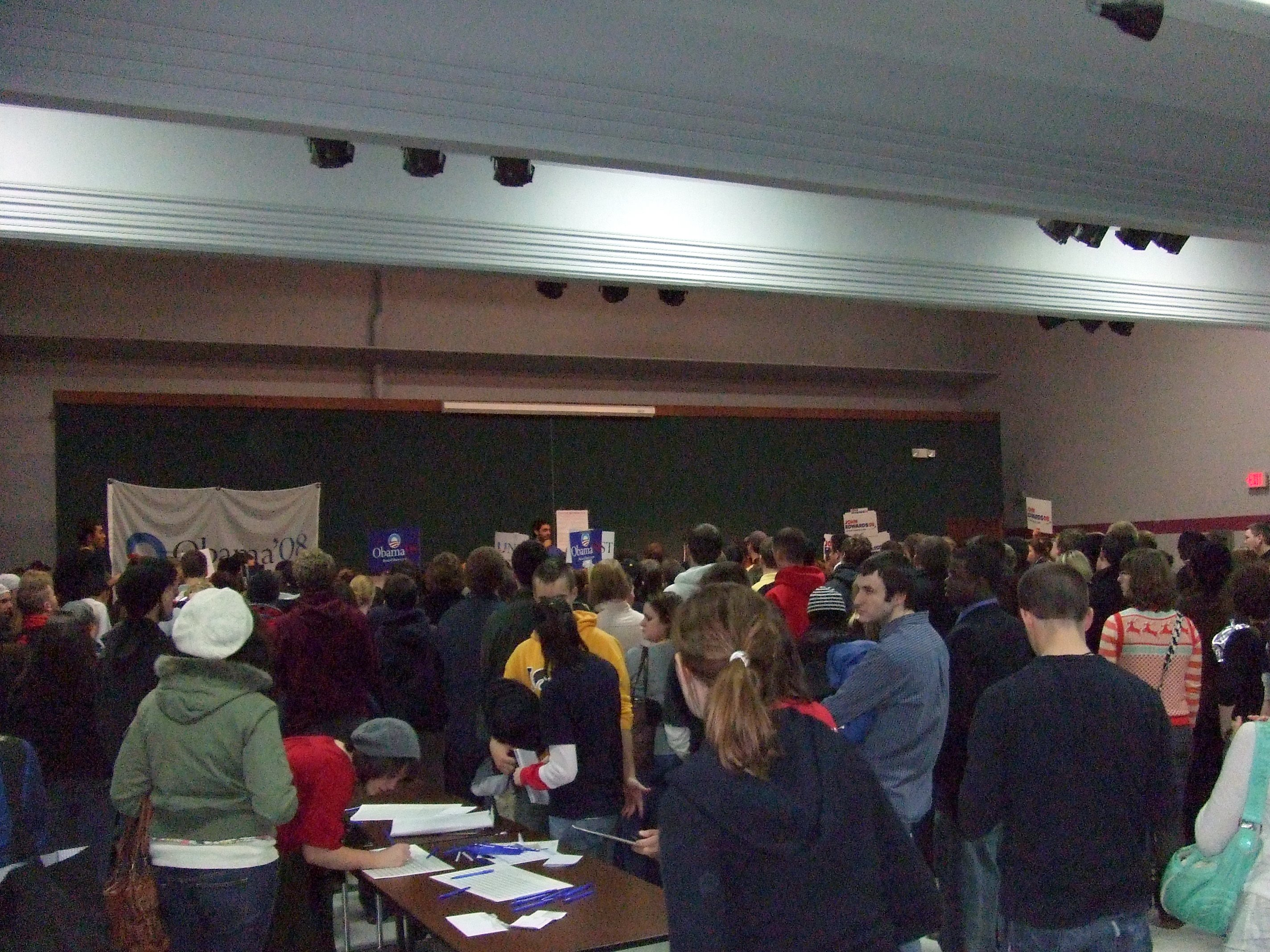
A 2008 Democratic caucus meeting in Iowa City, Iowa

The Iowa caucuses operate differently from the primary election used by most other states (see U.S. presidential primary). The caucuses are generally defined as "gatherings of neighbors". Rather than going to polls and casting ballots, Iowans gather at a set location in each of Iowa's precincts. Typically, these meetings occur in schools, churches, public libraries, or even individuals' houses. Caucuses are held every two years, during both the presidential and midterm election seasons, but those that receive national attention are the presidential preference caucuses, held every four years. The rules of the caucus process to determine delegates to national conventions are determined by the party and differ substantially between the Democratic and Republican parties.

In addition to the voting and the presidential preference choices, caucus-goers begin the process of writing their parties' platforms by introducing resolutions.

=== Criticisms ===
Public focus has been increasingly drawn to the Iowa caucus procedure. Public confidence in the integrity of the caucus system was heavily undermined after the 2020 Iowa Democratic caucus in which numerous irregularities were revealed, including disputed caucus totals following the use of a new smartphone app developed for the caucus, and a failure to publish official results for nearly a week.

Many political figures have also echoed concerns. Sen. Dick Durbin (D-IL): "I think the Democratic caucus in Iowa is a quirky, quaint tradition which should come to an end. As we try to make voting easier for people across America, the Iowa caucus is the most painful situation we currently face for voting." Former presidential candidate Julián Castro, who has long been critical of the Iowa caucuses, blasted the process: "It's a mess. What we saw out there and heard about are, consistently, errors in the way that this process was done, whether in the initial phase or the realignment. Inconsistencies in how it was done across precinct sites, caucus sites. It is a total mess."

=== Democratic Party ===
Each precinct divides its delegate seats among the candidates in proportion to caucus goers' votes. Participants indicate their support for a particular candidate by standing in a designated area of the caucus site (forming a preference group). An area may also be designated for an "uncommitted" group. Participants may try to convince their neighbors to support their candidates. Each preference group might informally deputize a few members to recruit supporters from the other groups and, in particular, from among those undecided. Undecided participants might visit each preference group to ask its members about their candidate.

After some time, the electioneering is temporarily halted, and the supporters for each candidate (and for "uncommitted") are counted. At this point, the caucus officials determine which candidates or groups are viable, potentially including the "uncommitted" group. Depending on the number of county delegates to be elected, the viability threshold is no less than 15% of attendees. (For four or more delegates, the threshold is 15%. For three delegates, the threshold is the total number of voters, divided by 6, roughly 16.66%. For two delegates, the threshold is 25%. For one delegate, there is no threshold, and the delegate is elected by a majority vote of eligible voters in attendance, following the first round of alignment.) For a candidate (or the "uncommitted" group) to earn any delegates from a particular precinct, the candidate or group must have the support of at least the percentage of participants required by the viability threshold. Once viability is determined, participants have an opportunity to realign: although supporters of viable candidates or groups are locked into their choice, the supporters of nonviable candidates or groups may find a viable candidate or group to support, join with supporters of another nonviable candidate or group to secure a delegate for one of the two, or abstain. This realignment is a distinction of caucuses in that (unlike in most primaries) a voter's second choice can help a candidate.

When the voting is closed, a final headcount is conducted, and each precinct apportions delegates to the county convention. These numbers are reported to the state party, which counts the total number of delegates for each candidate (and delegates who are "uncommitted") and reports the results to the media. Most of the participants go home, leaving a few to finish the business of the caucus: each preference group elects its delegates, and then the groups reconvene to elect local party officers and discuss the platform. The delegates are chosen by the precinct then go to a later caucus, the county convention, to choose delegates to the district convention and state convention. Most of the delegates to the Democratic National Convention are selected at the district convention, with the remaining ones selected at the state convention. Delegates to each level of convention are initially bound to support their chosen candidate but can later switch in a process very similar to what occurs at the precinct level; however, as major shifts in delegate support are rare, the media declares the candidate with the most delegates on the precinct caucus night the winner and relatively little attention is paid to the later caucuses.

In 2014, the Iowa Democratic Party introduced changes to the caucus system to allow members of the military to participate in a statewide caucus and establish satellite caucuses for voters with disabilities and others who have trouble making it to the physical location of the caucuses.

In 2016, the Iowa Democratic Party held the first-ever tele-caucus for members of the military serving outside Iowa and their families; Iowans in the Peace Corps and Diplomatic Corps; and students and Iowans living abroad. In addition, it held satellite caucuses in 2020, in an attempt to improve accessibility and participation in the Iowa caucuses. Starting in 2020, 10% of state convention delegates will be assigned through tele-caucuses.

Beginning with the 2020 caucus, the Iowa Democratic Party publishes not only "State Delegate Equivalents", based on a calculation of likely delegate results after the state caucus is held, but also a statewide raw vote count after the first alignment round (including results for all non-viable candidates) and a statewide raw vote count for all viable candidates after the second alignment round.

=== Republican Party ===
The process of selecting Iowa delegates to the Republican National Convention prior to the 2016 election cycle started with the selection of delegates to the county conventions, which in turn affected the delegates elected to district conventions who also served as delegates to the state convention where delegates were chosen for the national convention.

This process rewarded candidate organizers who not only got supporters to the caucus sites but also got supporters willing to serve as delegates to county conventions and willing to vote for other delegates who supported a specific candidate. In 2012, this process resulted in Ron Paul supporters dominating the Iowa delegation to the Republican National Convention, having 22 of the 28 Iowa delegates, with Mitt Romney getting the other six delegates.

Because the delegates elected at the caucuses are not required to declare a candidate preference, the media does not always have a purely objective way to determine the success of individual candidates at the caucuses. The media focused on the secret ballot polling conducted at the caucus sites and have generally referred to this non-binding poll as the caucus. There were irregularities in the 2012 caucus site polling results, including the fact that eight precinct results went missing and were never counted.

Because of the irregularities in the process and the fact that the totals reported to the media were unrelated to the delegate selection process, there have been changes in both how the caucus site secret ballot polling is sent to state party headquarters and in how Iowa delegates to the national convention are required to vote.

Beginning with the 2012 presidential election, Iowa switched from the old winner-take-all allocation to proportional allocation. The change was made to prolong the race, giving lesser-known candidates a chance and making it harder for a frontrunner to secure the majority early. It was also hoped that this change in the election system would energize the base of the party.

Starting in 2016, caucus results have become binding when selecting delegates. Acting in accordance with a mandate from the Republican National Committee, the delegates are bound on the first ballot to vote for candidates in proportion to the votes cast for each candidate at the caucus sites.

== History ==
Since 1972, the Iowa caucuses have had a 55% success rate at predicting which Democrat, and a 43% success rate at predicting which Republican, will go on to win the nomination of their political party for president at that party's national convention.

=== 2004 ===
Since Republican President George W. Bush did not face any opposition in 2004, only Democratic caucuses were held. The meetings ran from 6:30 p.m. until approximately 7:00 p.m. on January 19, 2004, with a turnout of about 124,000 caucus-goers. The county convention occurred on March 13, the district convention on April 24, and the state convention on June 26. Delegates could and did change their votes based on further developments in the race; for instance, in 2004 the delegates pledged to Dick Gephardt, who left the race after the precinct caucuses, chose a different candidate to support at the county, district, and state level.

The number of delegates each candidate receives eventually determines how many state delegates from Iowa that candidate will have at the Democratic National Convention. Iowa sends 56 delegates to the DNC out of a total of 4,366.

Of the 45 delegates that were chosen through the caucus system, 29 were chosen at the district level. Ten delegates were at-large delegates, and six were "party leader and elected official" (PLEO) delegates; these were assigned at the state convention. There were also 11 other delegates, eight of whom were appointed from local Democratic National Committee members; two were PLEO delegates and one was elected at the state Democratic convention. John Kerry won the Iowa caucuses with 38% of the vote, John Edwards coming second.

=== 2008 ===
Election results by county. Red for Mike Huckabee, Green for Mitt Romney, Yellow for Ron Paul.

Purple for Barack Obama, Orange John Edwards, Yellow for Hillary Clinton

The 2008 Iowa Democratic caucuses and 2008 Iowa Republican caucuses took place January 3 at 7 p.m. CT. Candidates spent tens of millions of dollars on local television advertisements and hundreds of paid staff in dozens of field offices. Barack Obama (D) and Mike Huckabee (R) were the eventual winners.

=== 2012 ===
The 2012 Iowa caucuses took place on Tuesday, January 3, starting at 7 p.m. CST. Incumbent president Barack Obama only faced minor opposition in the Democratic caucus and received 98% of the vote, but the Republican caucus was heavily contested between several challengers. Initial results reported that Mitt Romney beat out Rick Santorum by just 8 votes, but when the final results came out two weeks later Rick Santorum secured the victory over Romney by a margin of 34 votes with Ron Paul in a strong 3rd. Results were certified by the Caucus, but not by the Republican party, who declared it a split decision due to missing reports from 8 precincts, but who later certified the caucus as a win for Santorum. The caucus winner changed yet again when the Iowa delegate totals were finally determined giving Ron Paul the win along with several other states that same weekend.

=== 2016 ===
Election results by county. Yellow for Ted Cruz, Blue for Donald Trump, Red for Marco Rubio.

Yellow for Hillary Clinton, Green for Bernie Sanders

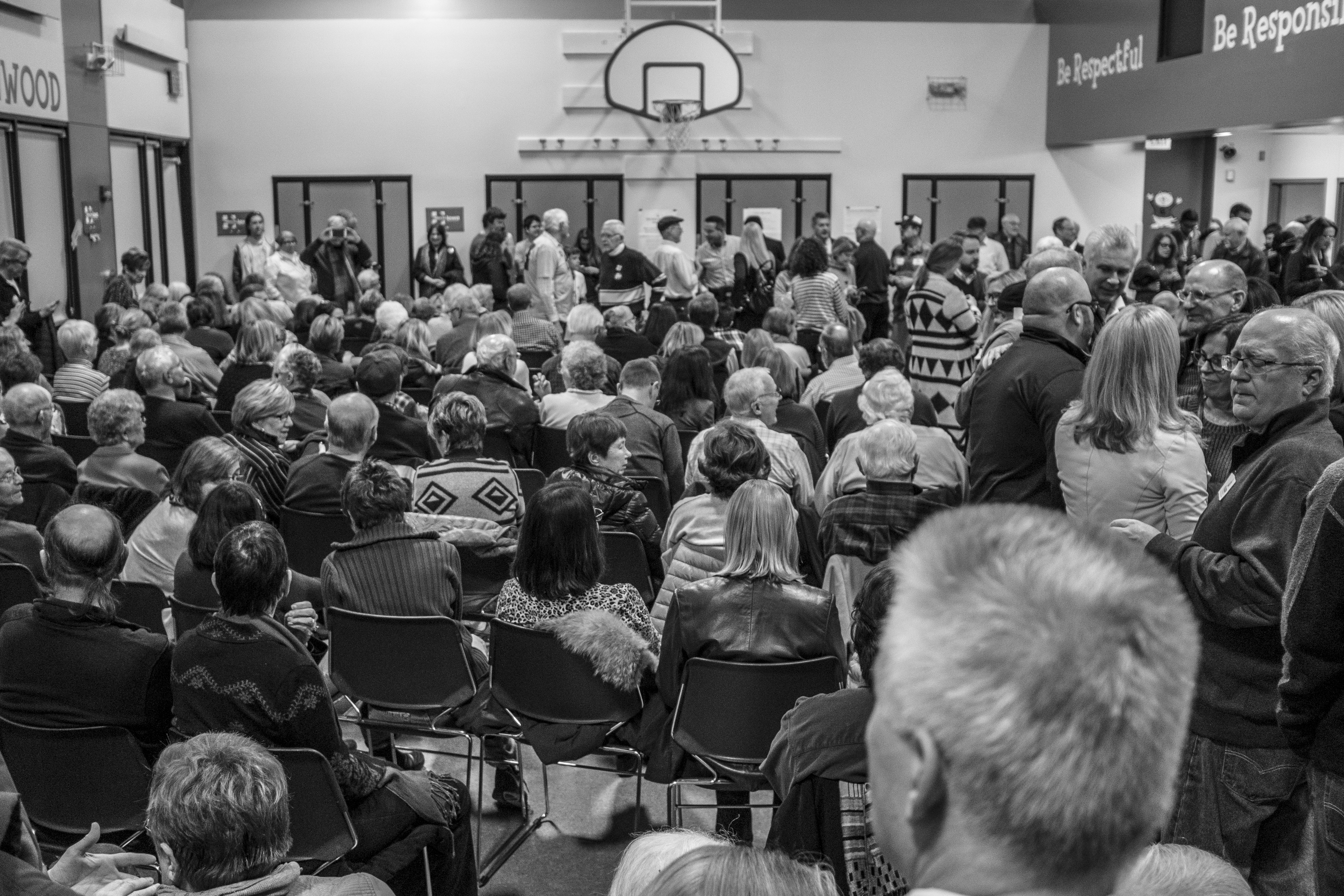
Democratic precinct 61, 2016

The 2016 Iowa caucuses took place on Monday, February 1. The counting started at 7 p.m. CST and lasted one hour, after the caucus discussions. For the first time, results were electronically sent to both Democratic and Republican headquarters.

In the Democratic caucus, Hillary Clinton received 45% of the vote and 23 pledged delegates, defeating Bernie Sanders, with 41% and 21 delegates. The Republican caucus awarded delegates to nine candidates: 8 to Ted Cruz, with 28% of the vote; 7 each to Donald Trump and Marco Rubio, with 24% and 23% respectively; 3 to Ben Carson, with 9%; and 1 delegate each to five other candidates.

=== 2020 ===
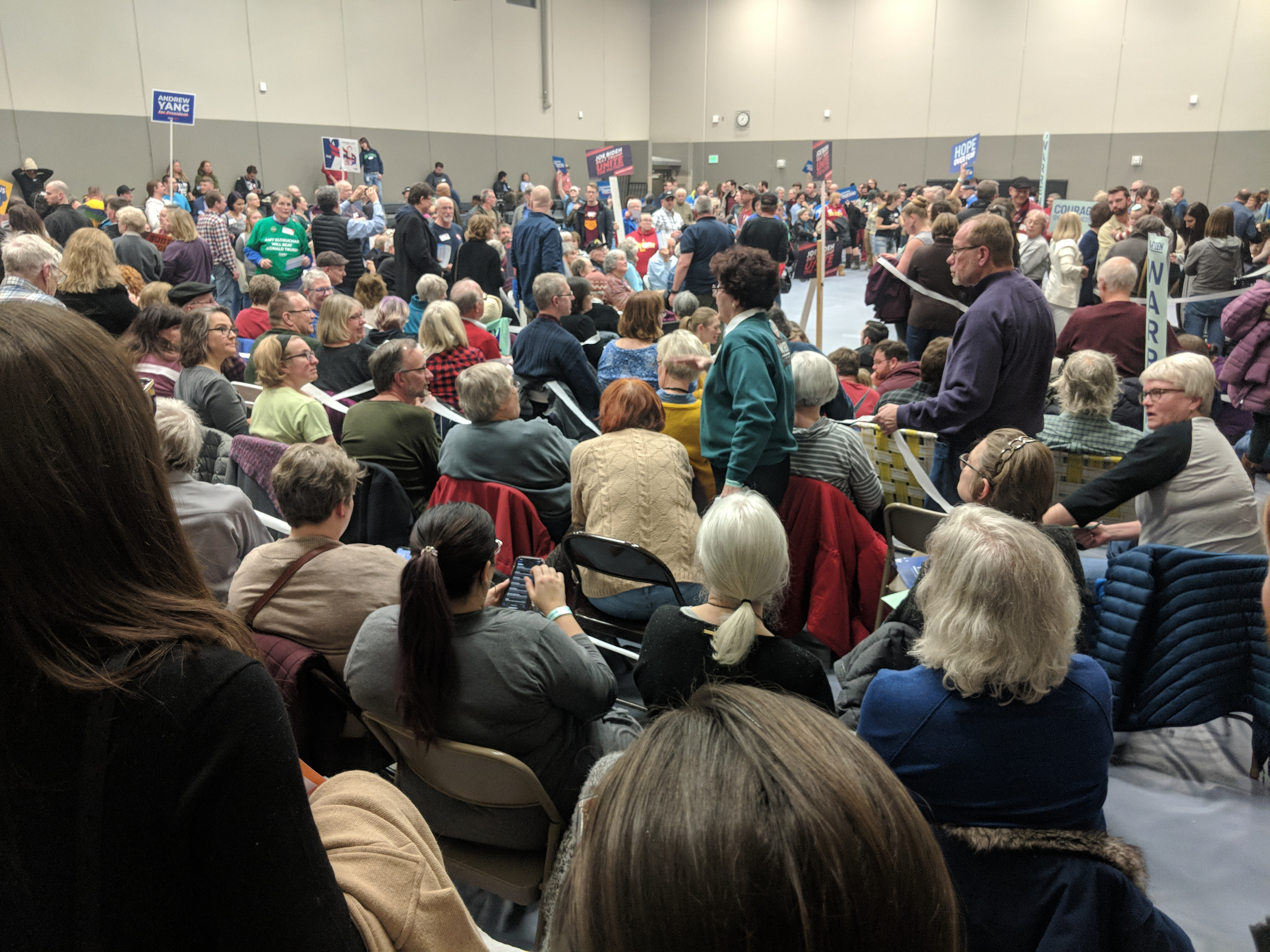
Iowa Caucus Precinct 15 in Ames (2020) During First Alignment

The 2020 Iowa caucuses occurred on Monday, February 3. The results of the 2020 Iowa Democratic caucus were delayed due to "inconsistencies in the reporting of three sets of results," according to Mandy McClure, the party's communications director. "In addition to the tech systems being used to tabulate results, we are also using photos of results and a paper trail to validate that all results match and ensure that we have confidence and accuracy in the numbers we report. This is simply a reporting issue, the app did not go down and this is not a hack or an intrusion. The underlying data and paper trail is sound and will simply take time to further report the results."

Delays in reporting were attributed to the failure of a new reporting app for the Iowa Democratic Party presidential caucus, including an inability to download or launch the app as well as an inability for the app to function well once launched; the failure of the backup phone number system after too many people attempted to call the phone number due to the failing app; and confusion over the correct way to count and calculate the initial and final popular votes as well as state delegate equivalent values.

A complete official count of the first alignment popular vote, the second alignment popular vote, and state delegate equivalents was released on February 6, 3 days after Iowa Democrats voted. However, various outlets including The New York Times and NBC News reported logical inconsistencies in certain precincts (such as state delegate equivalents being awarded to the wrong candidates and more people voting for the second alignment than the first alignment). This led the Democratic National Committee chairman Tom Perez to request the state Democratic Party (which runs the caucuses) to "recanvass" or recalculate the results including state delegate equivalents.

The app in question was provided by a 5-month-old company, Shadow Inc., which failed to develop and test the product adequately. The CEO and founder, Tara McGowan, also founded the ACRONYM corporation in 2017 and Courier Newsroom in 2019. Her husband, Michael Halle, is a senior strategist to the campaign of Pete Buttigieg. Multiple unverified claims of the Buttigieg campaign funding the organization, having investment interests in, and even sharing partial ownership in either company have been made. However, the only verified transactions between the Buttigieg campaign and either entity is a contract for text and messages services. The Joe Biden campaign had also contracted with Shadow, Inc for the same services, as well as former candidate Kirsten Gillibrand. After the app failure, McGowan distanced herself and ACRONYM from Shadow Inc., stating that it was an "independent" entity. Both companies are founded and directed by McGowan and Halle, and they share the same registered address. While the corporation's official website doesn't officially name its members, data gathered from LinkedIn reveals that its top executives were all involved in one way or another with Hillary Clinton's 2016 election campaign. James Hickey (Shadow, Inc.'s Chief Operating Officer) and Krista Davis (its Chief Software Architect) were both vital to the digital aspect of her campaign.

=== 2024 ===
The 2024 Iowa Republican presidential caucuses were held on January 15, 2024, with 40 delegates to the 2024 Republican National Convention allocated on a proportional basis. The winner was Donald Trump, followed by Ron DeSantis and Nikki Haley.

Iowa's Democratic presidential caucuses had in-person gatherings on January 15 focusing only on party business. Voting on candidates will be done exclusively via mail-in ballots from January 12 until Super Tuesday, March 5, 2024. This was the result of a compromise between the Iowa Democratic Party and the Democratic National Committee. Iowa traditionally holds its race first during the presidential primary and caucuses season, but the DNC originally wanted South Carolina to instead hold its race first on February 3. 46 delegates to the Democratic National Convention will be allocated to presidential candidates.

== Democratic results ==
Notes: An asterisk indicates a write-in candidate. Candidates in bold won the primary. Candidates in italics were incumbent presidents.

- 1972 (January 24): **"Uncommitted"** (36%), Edmund Muskie (36%), George McGovern (23%), Hubert Humphrey (2%), Eugene McCarthy (1%), Shirley Chisholm (1%), and Henry M. Jackson (1%)
- 1976 (January 19): **"Uncommitted"** (37%), Jimmy Carter (28%), Birch Bayh (13%), Fred R. Harris (10%), Morris Udall (6%), Sargent Shriver (3%), and Henry M. Jackson (1%)
- 1980 (January 21): **Jimmy Carter** (59%) and Ted Kennedy (31%)
- 1984 (February 20): **Walter Mondale** (49%), Gary Hart (17%), George McGovern (10%), Alan Cranston (7%), John Glenn (4%), Reubin Askew (3%), and Jesse Jackson (2%)
- 1988 (February 8): **Dick Gephardt** (31%), Paul Simon (27%), Michael Dukakis (22%), Jesse Jackson (9%), and Bruce Babbitt (6%)
- 1992 (February 10): **Tom Harkin** (76%), "Uncommitted" (12%), Paul Tsongas (4%), Bill Clinton (3%), Bob Kerrey (2%), and Jerry Brown (2%)
- 1996 (February 12): **Bill Clinton** (98%), "Uncommitted" (1%), and Ralph Nader (1%)
- 2000 (January 24): **Al Gore** (63%) and Bill Bradley (37%)
- 2004 (January 19): **John Kerry** (38%), John Edwards (32%), Howard Dean (18%), Dick Gephardt (11%), and Dennis Kucinich (1%)
- 2008 (January 3): **Barack Obama** (38%), John Edwards (30%), Hillary Clinton (29%), Bill Richardson (2%), and Joe Biden (1%)
- 2012 (January 3): **Barack Obama** (98%) and "Uncommitted" (2%)
- 2016 (February 1): **Hillary Clinton** (50%), Bernie Sanders (49%), and Martin O'Malley (1%)
- 2020 (February 3):
  - State Delegate Equivalents: **Pete Buttigieg** (26%), Bernie Sanders (26%), Elizabeth Warren (18%), Joe Biden (16%), Amy Klobuchar (12%), and others (2%)
  - Delegates: **Pete Buttigieg** (14), Bernie Sanders (12), Elizabeth Warren (8), Joe Biden (6), Amy Klobuchar (1), and others (0)
  - First Round Popular Vote: **Bernie Sanders** (25%), Pete Buttigieg (21%), Elizabeth Warren (18%), Joe Biden (15%), Amy Klobuchar (13%), Andrew Yang (5%), Tom Steyer (2%), and others (1%)
  - Second Round Popular Vote: **Bernie Sanders** (27%), Pete Buttigieg (25%), Elizabeth Warren (20%), Joe Biden (14%), Amy Klobuchar (12%), Andrew Yang (1%), uncommitted (1%), and others (0%)
- 2024 (March 5): **Joe Biden** (90%) and "Uncommitted" (4%)

== Republican results ==
Notes: An asterisk indicates a write-in candidate. Candidates in bold won the primary. Candidates in italics were incumbent presidents.

- 1976 (January 19): **Gerald Ford** (45%) and Ronald Reagan (43%)
- 1980 (January 21): **George H. W. Bush** (32%), Ronald Reagan (30%), Howard Baker (15%), John Connally (9%), Phil Crane (7%), John B. Anderson (4%), and Bob Dole (2%)
- 1984 (February 20): **Ronald Reagan** (unopposed)
- 1988 (February 8): **Bob Dole** (37%), Pat Robertson (25%), George H. W. Bush (19%), Jack Kemp (11%), and Pete DuPont (7%)
- 1992 (February 10): **George H. W. Bush** (unopposed)
- 1996 (February 12): **Bob Dole** (26%), Pat Buchanan (23%), Lamar Alexander (18%), Steve Forbes (10%), Phil Gramm (9%), Alan Keyes (7%), Richard Lugar (4%), and Morry Taylor (1%)
- 2000 (January 24): **George W. Bush** (41%), Steve Forbes (31%), Alan Keyes (14%), Gary Bauer (9%), John McCain (5%), and Orrin Hatch (1%)
- 2004 (January 19): **George W. Bush** (unopposed)
- 2008 (January 3): **Mike Huckabee** (34%), Mitt Romney (25%), Fred Thompson (13%), John McCain (13%), Ron Paul (10%), Rudy Giuliani (4%), and Duncan Hunter (1%)
- 2012 (January 3): **Rick Santorum** (25%), Mitt Romney (25%), Ron Paul (21%), Newt Gingrich (13%), Rick Perry (10%), Michele Bachmann (5%), and Jon Huntsman (1%)
- 2016 (February 1): **Ted Cruz** (28%), Donald Trump (24%), Marco Rubio (23%), Ben Carson (9%), Rand Paul (5%), Jeb Bush (3%), Carly Fiorina (2%), and others (7%)
- 2020 (February 3): **Donald Trump** (97%), Bill Weld (1%), Joe Walsh (1%), and others (1%)
- 2024 (January 15): **Donald Trump** (51%), Ron DeSantis (21%), Nikki Haley (19%), Vivek Ramaswamy (8%), and others (1%)

== See also ==
- United States presidential election
- Iowa Straw Poll
- New Hampshire presidential primary, first official election-year event since 1952
