= Doug Wead =

American writer (1946–2021)

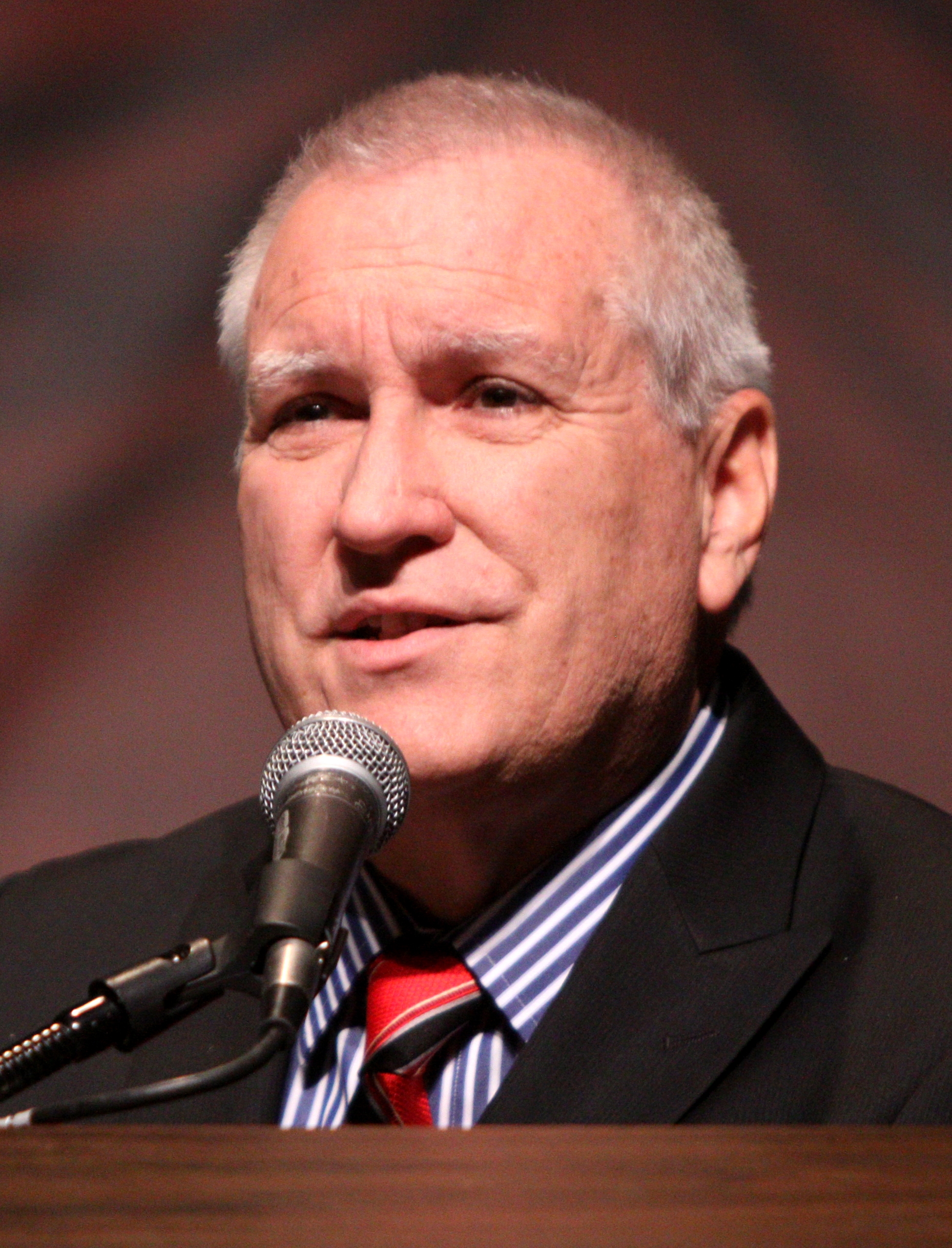
- Wead in 2011
- Born: Douglas Wead; May 17, 1946; Muncie, Indiana, U.S.
- Died: December 10, 2021 (aged 75)
- Occupations: Writer, political commentator
- Political party: Republican

Roy Douglas Wead (May 17, 1946 – December 10, 2021) was an American conservative commentator and writer. He wrote 27 books.

In 1992, Wead was the Republican candidate for Arizona's 6th congressional district, but was defeated by the Democratic candidate, Karan English. He served as special assistant to U.S. president George H. W. Bush, and has been credited with coining the phrase "compassionate conservative". Between 1997 and 2000, Wead recorded several hours of phone conversations between himself and George W. Bush without Bush's knowledge.

== Early life and education ==
Wead was born in Muncie, Indiana. He attended Riley High School, in South Bend, Indiana, then graduated from Canyonville Bible Academy, a private boarding school in Canyonville, Oregon, in 1964. He also attended Central Bible College in Springfield, Missouri. In 1990, Wead was given an honorary degree from Oral Roberts University in Tulsa, Oklahoma.

== Career ==
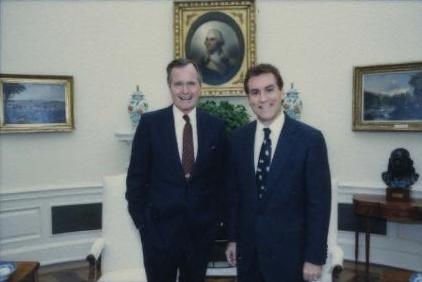
Wead with President George H. W. Bush in 1990

In 1979, Wead gave a speech titled "The Compassionate Conservative" at the annual Charity Awards Dinner, and tapes of the speech were later sold at corporate seminars.

In 1992, Wead was the Republican candidate for U.S. Congress in Arizona's 6th congressional district, despite having lived in Arizona for only two years. Wead won the Republican nomination by proposing a tax limit and airing a television commercial featuring praise by former President Ronald Reagan for his humanitarian efforts. The Democratic nominee, Karan English, received the endorsement of former Arizona Senator and 1964 Republican presidential nominee Barry Goldwater, who noted her 22 years of residency in the state. Wead countered that Goldwater's support of abortion rights spurred the unexpected crossing of party lines. He lost the general election to English.

Wead was an active participant in the 2000 United States presidential election, receiving some credit for George W. Bush's victory in the Iowa straw polls of 1999. Time magazine called Wead an insider in the Bush family orbit and "the man who coined the phrase 'compassionate conservative'", which George W. Bush picked up in 1987 from Wead.

Wead was a senior adviser to the Ron Paul 2012 Campaign, and the Rand Paul 2016 campaign.

Wead wrote the 2019 book Inside Trump's White House: The Real Story of His Presidency, published November 2019 by Center Street, an imprint of Hachette Book Group. The book made headlines when it claimed that the Obama White House held "Political Correctness" meetings. Former Obama administration members denied this, and responded that Wead was likely referring to the "Principals Committee" meetings of senior national security and Cabinet members. Wead confirmed that this was so, and blamed his false assertion on "a misunderstanding between him and his source".

=== September 2021 indictment ===
On September 20, 2021, the United States Department of Justice announced that Wead, along with Jesse Benton, had been indicted. Benton and Wead were both charged with one count of conspiracy to solicit and cause an illegal campaign contribution by a foreign national, effect a conduit contribution, and cause false records to be filed with the FEC, one count of contribution by a foreign national, one count of contribution in the name of another and three counts of making false entries in an official record.

=== George W. Bush taping controversy ===
In 1987, Doug Wead began tape recording members of the Bush family, with their permission, providing a historical record of the family. George Bush: Man of Integrity, which includes accounts of all family members, was published in 1988, written primarily from these taped conversations.

Wead continued his taping of George W. Bush between 1997 and 2000, recording at least nine hours of telephone conversations with Bush, who was then governor of Texas, as he engaged in his presidential run; the recordings were made without Bush's knowledge. Wead stated that he wanted to create an ongoing record of Bush as a historical figure. In February 2005, a month after Bush was sworn into office for his second term as president, Wead revealed the existence of the tapes to The New York Times, and publicly released twelve excerpts from them, each one ranging in length from five minutes to half an hour. He insisted that the taping was legal, having been made only in U.S. states where there was no law against taping someone without their consent. Several newsworthy revelations emerged from the tapes, such as Bush appearing to acknowledge having previously used marijuana and other drugs, and saying he would not answer press questions about his drug use because he did not want to set a bad example for children; calling then-primary opponent Steve Forbes "mean-spirited" and saying Forbes could not rely on Bush's help if Forbes won the Republican nomination; and calling his eventual Democratic election opponent, Al Gore, "pathologically a liar". Other excerpts seemed to match Bush's public persona, such as his statement that he was not worried about getting corrupted by the presidency because he read the Bible daily, which he called "pretty good about keeping your ego in check"; and his insistence that he was not homophobic, regardless of his opposition to gay marriage.

The release prompted some hostility from members of Bush's inner circle: Bush's wife, Laura Bush, said in an interview, "I don't know if I'd use the word 'betrayed,' but I think it's a little bit awkward for sure"; while Bush evangelical ally James Dobson said he was "shocked by [Wead's] breach of trust". Bush himself did not comment. The tapes' release also provoked negative reaction from some commentators, such as Bill Press, who called Wead "scum", and Bill O'Reilly, who called Wead "the lowest form of debris in the country."

== Death ==
Following a massive stroke in early December 2021, Wead's son Scott Wead confirmed that he had been taken off artificial respiration and died on December 10.

== Books ==
Wead's books include:

- Catholic Charismatics: Are They for Real? (1972)
- Tonight They'll Kill a Catholic (1974)
- The Compassionate Touch (1980)
- Don't Let Anyone Steal Your Dream (1978)
- Millionaire Mentality (1993)
- Reagan in Pursuit of the Presidency (1980)
- The Iran Crisis (1980)
- All the Presidents' Children: Triumph and Tragedy in the Lives of the First Families (2004)
- The Raising of a President: The Mothers and Fathers of Our Nation's Leaders (2006)
- Game of Thorns: The Inside Story of Hillary Clinton's Failed Campaign and Donald Trump's Winning Strategy (2017)
- Inside Trump's White House: The Real Story of His Presidency (2019)
