= 2000 Iowa Republican presidential caucuses =

- January 24, 2000

30 unpledged Republican National Convention delegates
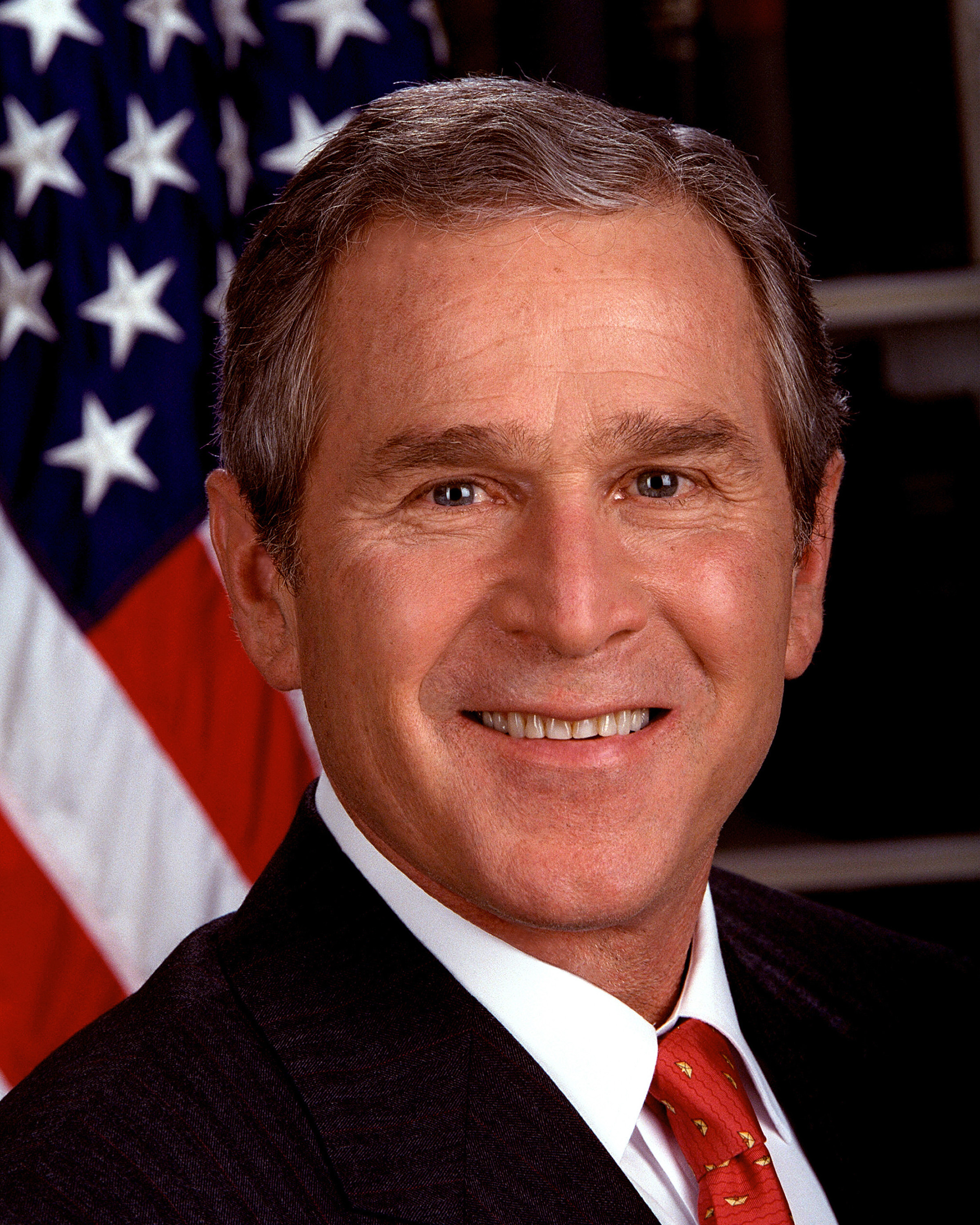

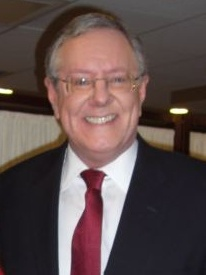

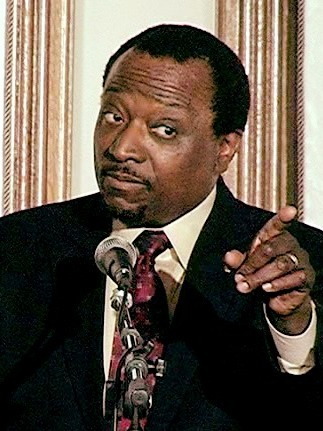

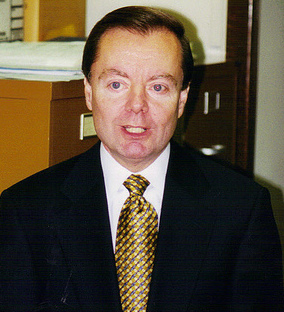
Nominee	George W. Bush	Steve Forbes
Home state	Texas	New York
Delegate count	10	8
Popular vote	35,948	26,744
Percentage	40.99%	30.50%
Nominee	Alan Keyes	Gary Bauer
Home state	Maryland	Kentucky
Delegate count	4	2
Popular vote	12,496	7,487
Percentage	14.24%	8.53%
- Iowa results by county George W. Bush Steve Forbes Gary Bauer

The 2000 Iowa Republican presidential caucuses took place on January 24, 2000. The Iowa Republican caucuses are an unofficial primary, with the delegates to the state convention selected proportionally via a straw poll. The Iowa caucuses marked the traditional formal start of the delegate selection process for the 2000 United States presidential election.

== Background ==
The 2000 election cycle marked the first open Republican presidential primary since 1996, following two terms of Democratic President Bill Clinton. The Republican field was notably crowded, with several prominent candidates vying for the nomination. Texas Governor George W. Bush entered the race as the presumptive frontrunner, having secured significant party establishment support and unprecedented early fundraising success, raising over $37 million by mid-1999.

Bush faced competition from several experienced politicians and businesspeople. Steve Forbes, the publisher of Forbes magazine, launched his second presidential campaign after his unsuccessful 1996 bid, focusing heavily on his proposal for a flat tax. Gary Bauer, the former president of the Family Research Council, positioned himself as a champion of social conservatives and the pro-life movement.

=== Campaign activity ===
The months leading up to the caucuses saw intense retail campaigning across Iowa's 99 counties. Bush's campaign emphasized his record as Texas governor, particularly his work on education reform and tax cuts, while promoting his philosophy of "compassionate conservatism." His campaign built an extensive ground operation, led by future Republican National Committee chairman Ken Mehlman, which focused on identifying and turning out likely supporters.

Forbes invested heavily in television advertising across the state, spending millions from his personal fortune to promote his economic agenda. His campaign particularly emphasized opposition to the Internal Revenue Service and support for school choice. The Forbes campaign also built a sophisticated voter identification system, attempting to replicate the success of his second-place finish in the 1996 Iowa caucuses.

== The Ames Straw Poll ==
The 2000 Ames straw poll was held at Iowa State University's Hilton Coliseum on August 14, 1999. The event served as a major fundraiser for the Iowa Republican Party, with participants required to purchase $25 tickets to participate. Campaigns typically purchased large blocks of tickets and provided free transportation to supporters, making the event as much a test of organizational strength as voter preference.

=== Results and Impact ===
George W. Bush secured a convincing victory with 31% of the vote, helped by superior organization and the enthusiasm of Iowa Republicans for his candidacy. Steve Forbes finished second with 21%, demonstrating that his message continued to resonate with fiscal conservatives. Elizabeth Dole, the former Red Cross president and wife of 1996 Republican nominee Bob Dole, placed third with 14%, but the performance failed to provide the momentum her campaign needed.

The results had immediate consequences for the Republican field. Lamar Alexander, former governor of Tennessee, withdrew from the race two days after his sixth-place finish. Dan Quayle, the former vice president, saw his campaign severely weakened by a disappointing eighth-place showing.

== January 2000 procedure ==
The Republican caucus process differed significantly from its Democratic counterpart in both rules and execution. While Democrats used a complex system of preference groups and realignment, Republicans employed a straightforward straw vote system that more closely resembled a traditional primary election.

Caucus meetings took place in approximately 2,000 precincts across Iowa's 99 counties. Party rules required all caucus locations to be accessible to persons with disabilities and provide adequate parking, in compliance with the Americans with Disabilities Act.

=== Voting Process ===
Each caucus began with the election of temporary officers, including a chairperson and secretary. Representatives of campaigns were allowed to make brief speeches on behalf of their candidates, typically limited to two minutes each per party rules.

The actual voting process was notably simple: participants received blank pieces of paper and wrote down their preferred candidate's name. Results were tallied at each precinct and reported to Republican Party headquarters in Des Moines via a dedicated phone system established specifically for the caucuses.

== Results of the January 2000 caucuses ==
=== Final Results ===
The final results showed George W. Bush winning with 41% of the vote, followed by Steve Forbes with 30.5%, and Alan Keyes with 14.2%. Total turnout reached 87,666 participants, down from 109,000 in 1996.

99% of precincts reporting
Candidate	Votes	Percentage	Delegates
George W. Bush	35,948	40.99%	10
Steve Forbes	26,744	30.50%	8
Alan Keyes	12,496	14.24%	4
Gary Bauer	7,487	8.53%	2
John McCain	4,093	4.67%	1
Orrin Hatch	898	1.02%	0
Total	87,666	100%	25

=== Geographic Analysis ===
The geographic distribution of support revealed distinct regional patterns across Iowa. Bush dominated in the state's population centers, winning decisive victories in Polk County (Des Moines) with 45% of the vote, Linn County (Cedar Rapids) with 43%, and Scott County (Davenport) with 44%.

Steve Forbes showed remarkable strength in rural agricultural counties, particularly in northern Iowa, where his opposition to the estate tax resonated strongly with family farmers. His campaign's emphasis on ethanol subsidies and agricultural policy helped him win several farming communities by significant margins.

Gary Bauer secured victories in several western Iowa counties, particularly in the deeply conservative Sioux County, where he received 38% of the vote. This region, known for its strong Dutch-American heritage and Reformed church presence, historically favored candidates emphasizing social conservative values.

=== Demographic Patterns ===
Exit polling conducted by CNN and the Des Moines Register revealed significant demographic divisions among caucus participants. Bush performed exceptionally well among:

- Self-identified moderate Republicans (48% support)
- First-time caucus attendees (44%)
- Voters prioritizing electability (52%)
- Suburban voters (46%)

Forbes's support came largely from self-described "very conservative" voters (35%) and those who listed taxes as their top issue (42%). His strongest demographic was among voters earning over $75,000 annually, where he captured 38% of the vote.

Alan Keyes performed notably well among evangelical Protestants (22%) and those who listed abortion as their most important issue (28%). His support was particularly strong among caucus-goers who attended church more than once per week, where he received 25% of the vote.

== Impact and Aftermath ==
The results of the Iowa caucuses had immediate and lasting effects on the Republican primary campaign. Within 24 hours of the results, Senator Orrin Hatch of Utah announced his withdrawal from the race, citing his last-place finish and depleted campaign funds.

Bush's victory reinforced his position as the frontrunner for the nomination, demonstrating his ability to convert financial and organizational advantages into electoral success. His campaign immediately shifted focus to the New Hampshire primary, where polls showed him trailing Senator McCain by double digits.

Steve Forbes's strong second-place showing, despite being outspent by Bush in the final weeks, temporarily revitalized his campaign. However, campaign finance reports later revealed that Forbes had spent over $10 million in Iowa alone, raising questions about the sustainability of his self-funded campaign strategy.

=== Media Coverage ===
The national media's coverage focused heavily on several major themes. The New York Times and The Washington Post emphasized Bush's organizational prowess, particularly the effectiveness of his campaign's turnout operation led by strategist Karl Rove. Television networks highlighted the historical parallel to his father's George H. W. Bush's victory in the 1980 Iowa Republican caucuses.

Political commentators extensively debated McCain's Iowa bypass strategy. While some analysts criticized his absence, the Boston Globe noted that the senator's limited resources and appeal to independent voters might have been better spent in New Hampshire's more favorable political environment.

=== Strategic Implications ===
The relatively low turnout compared to 1996 led to significant analysis within Republican circles. Party officials attributed the decrease partially to the intense negative advertising campaign between Bush and Forbes in the weeks leading up to the caucuses.

== Historical Significance ==
The 2000 Iowa Republican caucuses marked several significant developments in presidential politics. They represented the first crucial test of George W. Bush's national political operation, which would eventually carry him to the presidency.

As of 2020, Bush remains the last non-incumbent Republican who won both the Iowa caucuses and the eventual nomination. This fact has led to ongoing debates about Iowa's predictive value in the Republican nomination process, particularly given later victories by candidates who did not win Iowa, such as John McCain in 2008 and Mitt Romney in 2012.

== Legacy ==
The 2000 caucuses influenced the development of future Republican presidential campaigns in Iowa. The success of Bush's grassroots organization and Forbes's advertising strategy provided lessons for subsequent candidates.

The relationships built during the caucus campaign proved valuable during Bush's presidency, particularly in securing support for policies such as the Energy Policy Act of 2005, which included significant ethanol subsidies important to Iowa's agricultural economy.
