= Wholesale politics =

Wholesale politics refers to a political campaigning strategy that focuses on reaching large audiences through mass communication tools and broad-based appeals, distinguishing it from retail politics, which emphasizes personal, one-on-one interactions with voters. This approach is prevalent in large-scale political campaigns, particularly for national or statewide elections, where direct engagement with every voter is impractical.

== Historical context ==
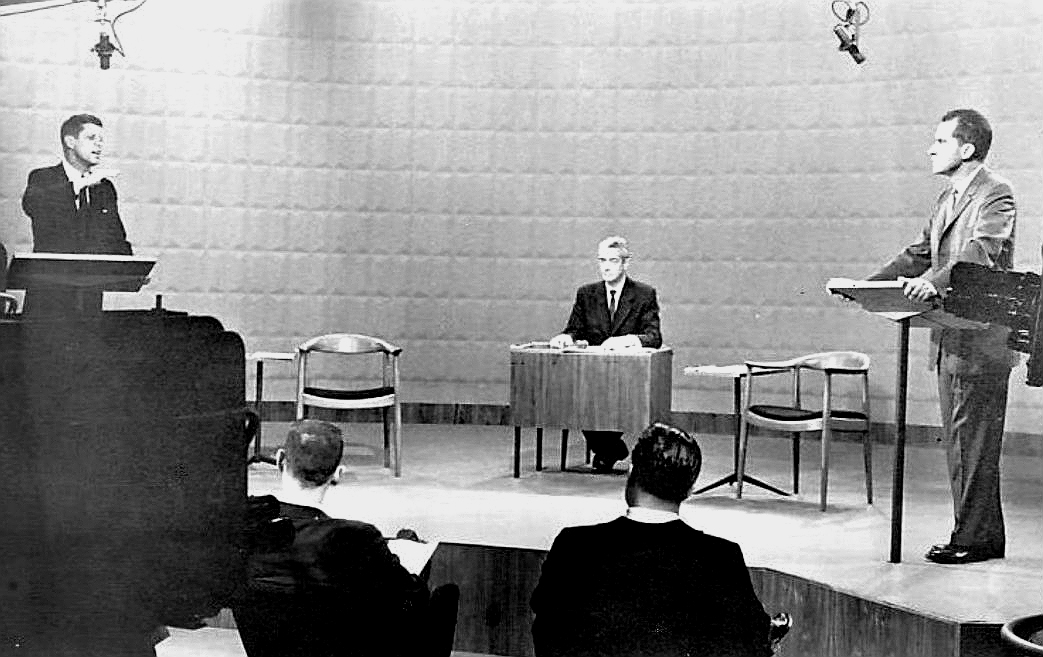
First presidential debate live on television between Nixon and Kennedy held on CBS in Chicago on September 26, 1960.

Wholesale campaigning has its roots in the evolution of mass media, with key milestones marking its transformation. The first televised presidential speech, delivered by President Harry S. Truman on October 5, 1947, demonstrated the potential of television to reach voters directly, albeit to a limited audience due to the unpopularity of the medium at the time. As television technology advanced, it became a central tool in campaigns. Richard Nixon's "Checkers" speech (1952) and the Kennedy-Nixon debates (1960) underscored its influence in shaping public opinion. By the 1970s, candidates used television strategically, leveraging both short ads and appearances on evening news programs to engage broad audiences. This shift from personal, retail-style campaigning to mass-media-driven wholesale strategies has continued into the digital era with the rise of social media platforms.

== 2024 media campaigning ==
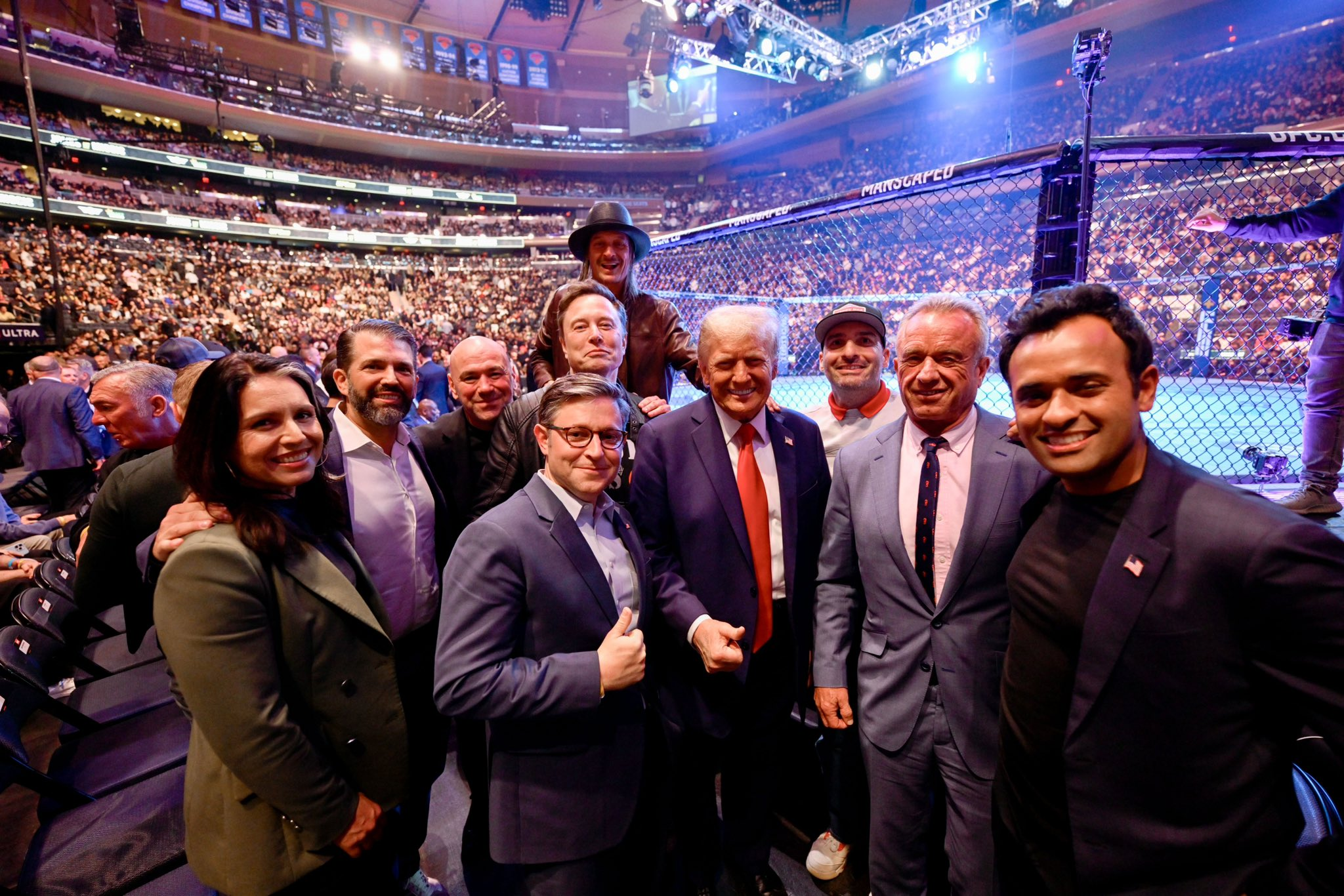
Donald Trump at a UFC fight in 2024 with Elon Musk, Tulsi Gabbard, Robert F. Kennedy Jr., Mike Johnson, Vivek Ramaswamy, Donald Trump Jr, Dana White, and Kid Rock.

During the 2024 campaign, Donald Trump maintained a strong presence on social media by strategically engaging with influencers like Logan Paul, Jake Paul, Adin Ross, Joe Rogan and many more notable personalities. He utilized platforms such as Truth Social, X, Kick, and TikTok to reach his supporters, sharing direct and engaging video content that highlighted his agenda and opinions of his opponents. These collaborations helped amplify his message to a broader audience and reinforce his appeal.

Harris at a 2023 White House ceremony where she says the viral line "You think you just fell out of a coconut tree?"

Kamala Harris, on the other hand, primarily focused her digital campaign efforts on TikTok. She used the platform to connect with younger voters through frequent, casual videos that highlighted her personality and showcased her responses to key issues. One notable example was a viral soundbite from a 2023 White House event where she playfully responded, "You think you just fell out of a coconut tree?" This content effectively utilized trending audio clips, positioning Harris as relatable and engaged with the younger demographic. Her TikTok presence, managed through KamalaHQ, leveraged the platform's capabilities to gain widespread visibility and build a strong community around her campaign.
