= Board for International Broadcasting =

Former U.S. governmental organization

The Board for International Broadcasting (BIB) was a commission established in the United States as a privately incorporated organization in 1973 by the International Broadcasting Act of 1973, Public Law 93-129, on October 19, 1973. This primarily covered Radio Free Europe/Radio Liberty (RFE/RL), established as an option to USSR broadcasting during the Cold War. In 1994, President Bill Clinton signed the International Broadcasting Act into law. This act disbanded the BIB and put control of the RFE/RL under the newly created bipartisan Broadcasting Board of Governors (BBG).

== History ==
Created in 1973 to oversee Radio Free Europe and Radio Liberty during the Nixon Administration. It was established as a recommendation of the Milton Eisenhower Commission to help promote the mission of RFE/RL. BIB took over financing and operation of broadcasting stations formerly funded by the CIA. It was replaced by the BBG, who oversees RFE/FL, Voice of America, Radio Marti and others.

== Mission ==
The aim of the board is: "to provide an effective instrumentality for the continuation of assistance to Radio Free Europe and Radio Liberty and to encourage a constructive dialog with the peoples of the Union of Soviet Socialist Republics and Eastern Europe." Members of the board, according to the bi-laws are "selected by the President from among Americans distinguished in the fields of foreign policy or mass communications" and cannot be concurrently full-time employees of the government.

== Chairmen ==
Steve Forbes was appointed in 1985 as the chairman and served during the Reagan Administration. He was reappointed by President George H. W. Bush. Dr. John A. Gronouski, professor of economics and public affairs at the University of Texas at Austin and former U.S. Postmaster General, served as chairman of the board during the Carter Administration.
