= Canyonville Christian Academy =

Private boarding school in Canyonville, Oregon, United States

Canyonville Academy
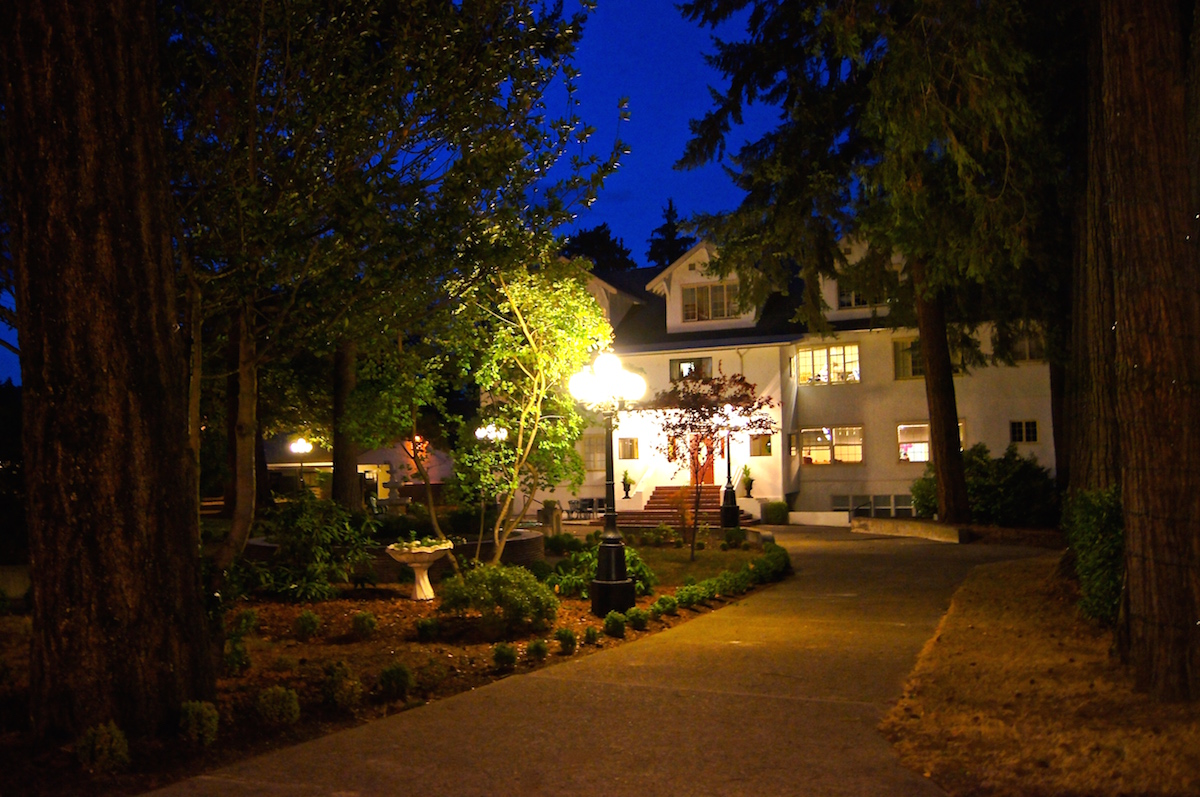

Location
- 250 E 1st Street; Canyonville, Douglas County, Oregon 97417; United States; 42.928751°N 123.278419°W

Information
- Type: Private boarding day
- Opened: 1924
- CEEB code: 380137
- NCES School ID: 01161806
- Grades: 9-12
- Colors: Navy blue and gold
- Athletics conference: OSAA Mountain View Conference Class 2A
- Mascot: Pilots
- Accreditation: ACSI, NAAS
- Affiliation: Christian
- Website: www.canyonville.net

Canyonville Academy (CA), previously known as Canyonville Bible Academy (CBA), was a private Christian boarding school in Canyonville, Oregon, United States. International students make up 70% of the school's body. CCA was founded in 1923. The school has been accredited through Cognia and is a part of the Association of Christian Schools International since 1979, and through Northwest Association of Accredited Schools since 1998.

== History ==
=== Austin Monroe Shaffer ===
The school was founded in 1924 by Reverend A.M. Shaffer. The school transitioned into a four-year boarding high school, with its first graduating class of two students (one of whom was Shaffer's son Robert) in 1932. The school became a grades 9-12 high school in 1935. A.M. Shaffer was the head of the school till 1961. The son of the founder Robert Shaffer was COO of the school from 1961 to 1965, and president of the school from 1965 till 1985.

=== Seminar class ===
Roger Shaffer (grandson of A. M. Shaffer) taught a culture class at the school called Seminar which is designed to expose students to different cultural experiences such as plays, operas, and museums. The class also included a section on investing, and had actively participated in managing a portfolio for the school. In 2013 the class won a national virtual trading contest sponsored by SIFMA, with two of CCA's portfolios placing in the top five.

Eleven Nigerian survivors of the Chibok kidnapping came to Oregon to continue their studies at the Canyonville Avademy.

=== School closed ===
As of June 28, 2022, landsearch.com listed the property in a pending sale in the amount of $4,400,000.

== Pilot athletics ==
The Canyonville athletic program was a member of the Oregon School Activities Association. Their mascot name was known as the Pilots in honor of the pilots of maritime vehicles in the oceans, lakes and rivers. They were a 2A school that competed in the Mountain View Conference.

== Notable alumni ==
- Doug Wead – Special assistant to president George H.W. Bush (senior White House staff)
- Don Stewart – Through his organization, founder of more than 1,000 churches in Republic of the Philippines
- Jenn Johnson – Musician (Bethel Music)
