= 1972 Iowa Democratic presidential caucuses =

- January 24, 1972

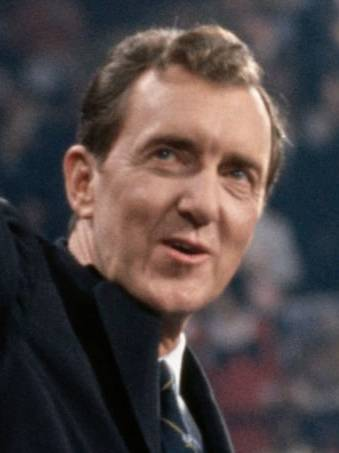

Candidate	Uncommitted	Edmund Muskie	George McGovern
Home state	n/a	Maine	South Dakota
Percentage	35.8%	35.5%	22.6%

The 1972 Iowa Democratic presidential caucuses were held on January 24, 1972, as the first step in determining the Democratic nominee for the 1972 election. Maine Senator Edmund Muskie received the most committed votes with 35.5%, while South Dakota Senator George McGovern, who had been trailing in most polls, came in a surprise second with 22.6%.

== Candidates ==
- Shirley Chisolm, U.S. Representative from NY-12
- Hubert Humphrey, 38th Vice President of the United States
- Henry M. Jackson, U.S Senator from Washington
- Eugene McCarthy, U.S. Senator from Minnesota
- George McGovern, U.S Senator from South Dakota
- Edmund Muskie, U.S. Senator from Maine

== Results ==
=== Caucus results ===
Caucus date: January 24, 1972

National pledged delegates determined: 0 (of 46)

1972 Iowa Democratic Presidential Caucus Results
Candidate	Votes (State Delegate Equivalents)	Percentage	Pledged National Delegates (expected on January 24)
Uncommitted	3,580	35.80%	18
Edmund Muskie	3,550	35.50%	18
George McGovern	2,260	22.60%	10
Hubert Humphrey	160	1.60%	0
Eugene McCarthy	140	1.40%	0
Shirley Chisolm	130	1.30%	0
Henry M. Jackson	110	1.10%	0
Other	70	.70%	0
	10,000	100.00%	46

=== County convention results ===
County convention date: February 26, 1972

National pledged delegates determined: 0 (of 46)

1972 Iowa Democratic Presidential County Convention Results
Candidate	Votes (State Delegate Equivalents)	Percentage	Pledged National Delegates (expected on February 26)
Edmund Muskie	1,439	38.50%	18
Uncommitted	1,126	30.12%	14
George McGovern	1,092	29.21%	14
Shirley Chisholm	39	1.04%	0
John Lindsay	19	.51%	0
Hubert Humphrey	16	.43%	0
Henry M. Jackson	6	.16%	0
Ted Kennedy	1	.03%	0
	3,738	100.00%	46

=== District convention results ===
District convention date: March 26, 1972

National pledged delegates determined: 34 (of 46)

1972 Iowa Democratic Presidential Congressional District Results
Candidate	Percentage	Pledged District Delegates (expected per March 26)	Pledged National Delegates (expected on March 26)
Edmund Muskie	41.18%	14	19
George McGovern	35.29%	12	16
Uncommitted	23.53%	8	11
	100.00%	34	46
