= Compassionate conservatism =

American political philosophy

Compassionate conservatism is an American political philosophy that stresses using conservative techniques and concepts in order to improve the general welfare of society. The philosophy supports the implementation of policies designed to help the disadvantaged and alleviate poverty through the free market, envisaging a triangular relationship between government, charities and faith-based organizations. The term entered mainstream parlance between 2001 and 2009, during the administration of US President George W. Bush. He used the term often to describe his personal views and embody some parts of his administration's agenda and policy approach.

The term itself is often credited to the American historian and politician Doug Wead, who used it as the title of a speech in 1979. Although its origins lie mostly in accepted economic principles, some applications of it have been criticized as paternalism. The term has been used in the United Kingdom by former Prime Minister David Cameron, in New Zealand by former Prime Minister John Key, and in Lithuania by President Gitanas Nausėda.

The term "compassionate conservatism" has also been applied to Christian democratic political parties. However, Christian democrats are far more supportive of government interventionism in the economy. Later Compassionate conservatism was seen as Third Way ideology and was compared to Clintonism.

== Origins of the term ==
Historian and presidential advisor Doug Wead may have been the first person to use the phrase compassionate conservative. In 1977, Wead wrote a book about Kolkata, India, entitled The Compassionate Touch. In 1979, he gave a popular speech entitled "The Compassionate Conservative" at the annual Washington Charity Dinner. Tapes of the speech were sold across the country at corporate seminars.

Wead contended that the policies of Republican conservatives should be motivated by compassion, not protecting the status quo. He declared himself to be "a bleeding heart conservative," meaning that he cared for people and sincerely believed that a free marketplace was better for the poor.

In 1981, in a perhaps-unrelated usage, Vernon Jordan of the National Urban League said of the Reagan administration,

I do not challenge the conservatism of this Administration. I do challenge its failure to exhibit a compassionate conservatism that adapts itself to the realities of a society ridden by class and race distinction.

— Vernon Jordan

In 1982, Wead co-authored with Ronald Reagan's Secretary of the Interior, James G. Watt, the book The Courage of a Conservative and developed his ideas further in chapter five of the book, which was entitled "The Compassionate Conservative." Russell Kirk saw Reagan as a compassionate conservative, while the Cato Institute sees Reaganism as something different from compassionate conservatism, but already year's before, the compassionate conservative Vernon Jordan didn't saw Reagan as one which Bruce Pilbeam supoorted. The Heritage Foundation and the Manhattan Institute on the other side argued that Reagan supported something similar to compassionate conservatism. Reagan aligned himself with Fusionism and fusionists tend to see the unpopularity of George W. Bush's "compassionate conservatism," such as his entitlement prescription drug program, and his party's following defeat by President Barack Obama in 2008 and 2012, as reasons requiring a fusionist renewal if conservatism was ever to regain the presidency. The Cato Institute argued that Bush tried to copy Reagan and his fusionism with compassionate conservatism. The Harvard Political Review wrote following on Bush's compassionate conservatism and Reagan political ideas "However, the degree to which Reagan’s rhetoric and actions correlate on these three points varies, as does the degree to which President Bush has stood by Reagan’s policies. In most instances, Bush’s breaks with Reagan on a variety of issues from tax policy to the use of military force can be attributed to a different agenda rather than an inability to imitate Reagan. While only history can write the definitive comparison, Bush’s overall philosophy and its emphasis on an active use of the government and its resources, known as “compassionate conservatism,” has been the main source of his departure from the Reagan ideals."

In 1984, U.S. Representative James R. Jones (D-OK) told The New York Times:

I think we should adopt the slogan of compassionate conservatism...We can be fiscally conservative without losing our commitment to the needy and we must redirect our policy in that direction.

— Rep. James R. Jones

Earlier the same year Republican Ray Shamie proclaimed that "I believe in a visionary and compassionate conservatism"

In June 1986, Wead wrote an article for the Christian Herald, describing then-vice-president George H. W. Bush, to whom he served as an aide, as a "compassionate conservative."

According to journalist Jacob Weisberg, George W. Bush, George H. W. Bush's son, first picked up the term "compassionate conservative" from Wead, in 1987.

In 1992, when Doug Wead ran for U.S. Representative from Arizona, he wrote a campaign book entitled Time for a Change. The first chapter was called "The Compassionate Conservative" and outlined Wead's philosophy that the masses did not care if Republican policies worked if the attitude and purpose behind the policies were uncaring.

Some insist the doctrine was invented by Marvin Olasky, who went on to memorialize it in his books Renewing American Compassion (1996) and Compassionate Conservatism: What it is, What it Does, and How it Can Transform America (2000), and Myron Magnet of the Manhattan Institute. Olasky has been called the "godfather of compassionate conservatism".

The phrase was popularized when George W. Bush adopted it as one of his key slogans during his 2000 presidential campaign against Al Gore. Bush also wrote the foreword to Olasky's Compassionate Conservatism. Olasky said others had come up with the term first.

== As a political descriptor ==
=== Use in the 1990s ===
Compassionate conservatism has been defined as the belief that conservatism and compassion complement each other. A compassionate conservative might see the social problems of the United States, such as health care or immigration, as issues that are better solved through cooperation with private companies, charities, and religious institutions rather than directly through government departments. As former Bush chief speechwriter Michael Gerson put it, "Compassionate conservatism is the theory that the government should encourage the effective provision of social services without providing the service itself."

Magnet and Olasky said 19th century compassionate conservatism was based in part on the Christian doctrine of original sin, which held that "Man is sinful and likely to want something for nothing. … Man's sinful nature leads to indolence."

In the words of Magnet,

Compassionate conservatives [...] offer a new way of thinking about the poor. They know that telling the poor that they are mere passive victims, whether of racism or of vast economic forces, is not only false but also destructive, paralyzing the poor with thoughts of their own helplessness and inadequacy. The poor need the larger society's moral support; they need to hear the message of personal responsibility and self-reliance, the optimistic assurance that if they try—as they must—they will make it. They need to know, too, that they can't blame "the system" for their own wrongdoing.

— Myron Magnet, The Wall Street Journal

Compassionate conservative philosophy argues for policies in support of traditional families, welfare reform to promote individual responsibility (cf. workfare), active policing, standards-based schools (cf. No Child Left Behind Act), and assistance (economic or otherwise) to poor countries around the world.

U.S. president George W. Bush said:

"It is compassionate to actively help our citizens in need. It is conservative to insist on accountability and results."

— President George W. Bush

Bush began his presidency hoping to make compassionate conservatism his centerpiece. After the September 11, 2001 attacks, he focused less on this theme, but, according to professor and author Ira Chernus, its fundamental ideas became central in his rhetoric about the war on terrorism.

=== Reception and criticism ===
Nicholas Lemann, writing in New Yorker magazine in 2015, wrote that George W. Bush's "description of himself, in the 2000 campaign, as a 'compassionate conservative' was brilliantly vague—liberals heard it as 'I'm not all that conservative,' and conservatives heard it as 'I'm deeply religious.' It was about him as a person, not a program."

In a July 1999 speech to the Democratic Leadership Council, then-President Bill Clinton criticized Bush's "compassionate conservative" self-description, saying: "This 'compassionate conservatism' has a great ring to it, you know? It sounds so good. And I've really worked hard to try to figure out what it means... I made an honest effort, and near as I can tell, here's what it means: It means, 'I like you. I do. And I would like to be for the patients' bill of rights and I'd like to be for closing the gun show loophole, and I'd like not to squander the surplus and, you know, save Social Security and Medicare for the next generation. I'd like to raise the minimum wage. I'd like to do these things. But I just can't, and I feel terrible about it.'" Similarly, in December 2005, then-British Prime Minister Tony Blair, speaking in the House of Commons, said: "the only difference between compassionate conservatism and conservatism is that under compassionate conservatism they tell you they're not going to help you but they're really sorry about it."

Some critics of George W. Bush criticized the phrase "compassionate conservatism" as simply sugarcoating, an empty phrase to make traditional conservatism sound more appealing to moderate voters. Liberal commentator Joe Conason, noting Bush's policy of tax cuts, wrote in 2003 that "so far, being a 'compassionate conservative' appears to mean nothing very different from being a hardhearted, stingy, old-fashioned conservative."

External videos
- Booknotes interview with Olasky on The Tragedy of American Compassion, January 22, 1995, C-SPAN

Others on the left have viewed it as an effort to remove America's social safety net out of the hands of the government and give it to Christian churches. "Liberals make a big mistake if they dismiss 'compassionate conservatism' as just a hypocritical catch phrase", wrote University of Colorado religion professor Ira Chernus. "For the right, it is a serious scheme to give tax dollars to churches through so-called 'faith-based initiatives.'" Nobel Prize–winning Keynesian economist and columnist Paul Krugman has called it a "dog whistle" to the religious right, referencing Marvin Olasky's The Tragedy of American Compassion, who believed the poor must help themselves and that poverty was the fault not of society but of the poor and of social workers. Krugman endorses Digby's analysis that right-wing compassionate 'charity' assumes that the giver has the right to investigate and dictate the life of the receiver, even for the smallest charity.

Conversely, the phrase has also been attacked from the right. John J. DiIulio, Jr. wrote that Bush's "Duty of Hope" speech, delivered in Indianapolis in May 1999, drew a "negative reaction from his party's right wings. ... Many Republican conservative activists hated the center-hugging 'compassionate conservative.' Others favored it, but only as a rhetorical Trojan Horse. If a 'compassionate conservative' was actually a government-shrinking libertarian in religious drag, then fine. But, if Bush really meant what he said, Gore-like, about volunteerism not being enough .... or about rejecting as 'destructive' the Reagan-tested idea that government itself is the main problem, then many conservative Republicans would not suffer it." Herman Cain criticized the idea of "compassionate conservatism" as leading to the Bush administration's increased government spending, saying that it "completely betrayed conservative voters and their decades of grassroots activism", and "alienated the party's conservative base", noting Bush policies such as the Medicare prescription-drug benefit, which increased the size of the Medicare program by around $500 billion.

In 2006, conservative commentator Jonah Goldberg has written that compassionate conservatism as implemented by George W. Bush differs markedly from the theoretical concept: "As countless writers have noted in National Review over the last five years, most conservatives never really understood what compassionate conservatism was, beyond a convenient marketing slogan to attract swing voters. The reality—as even some members of the Bush team will sheepishly concede—is that there was nothing behind the curtain." Similarly, conservative commentator Fred Barnes wrote: "Bush has famously defined himself as a compassionate conservative with a positive agenda. Almost by definition, this makes him a big government conservative."

Matt Miller said that the Democratic Party needs to reject Clintonism, and also compassionate conservatism and want to find a "Fourth Way".

Mike Pence stated "Whether it's called 'compassionate conservatism' or 'big government Republicanism,' after years of record increases in federal spending, more government is now the accepted Republican philosophy in Washington.".

=== Decline ===
The phrase and the idea of compassionate conservativism declined after the Bush administration left office. In December 2011, Christian commentator Jim Wallis of Sojourners, citing harsh rhetoric toward the poor and immigrants from candidates for the 2012 Republican presidential nomination, wrote that "the compassionate conservative agenda has virtually disappeared from the Republican Party." In January 2012, commentator Amy Sullivan wrote that "Just three years after George W. Bush left the White House, compassionate conservatives are an endangered species. In the new Tea Party era, they've all but disappeared from Congress, and their philosophy is reviled within the GOP as big-government conservatism." Sullivan noted that Republican presidential candidates "have jostled to take the hardest line in opposing government-funded programs to help the poor." The Washington Post columnist Eugene Robinson made similar observations.

== Other uses ==
=== United Kingdom ===
According to a 2006 report by the British think tank Policy Exchange, "compassionate conservative" was "one of the most prominent themes" of the Conservative Party under David Cameron. In speeches and the party's statement of aims and values around 2005 and 2006, Cameron and other senior Conservatives emphasized a "modern, compassionate conservatism" theme. Other figures associated with compassionate conservatism in Britain include Tim Montgomerie and Iain Duncan Smith. At the 2011 Conservative Party Conference, the party released a pamphlet titled Modern Compassionate Conservatism, which senior leaders such as Cameron and foreign secretary William Hague claimed had pushed for "compassionate" and "cuddly" policies. In 2015, Michael Gove claimed David Cameron was "a modern, compassionate Conservative." The term "compassionate conservative" was used as a way for the Conservatives to distance themselves from their "Nasty Party" image. This is exemplified by some think tanks, such as Bright Blue and the Centre for Social Justice. Compassionate conservatism is used describe a post-Thatcher "Third Way" British Conservatism.

=== Christian democracy ===
Political commentator Jane Louise Kandur has used the term "compassionate conservatism" to describe Christian democratic political parties, with their support of labour unions and church-established schools and hospitals. While Christian democrats uphold social conservatism, they advocate for human rights and social justice, being in support of the welfare state. However, unlike the American philosophy, they are far more supportive of government intervention in the economy.

== Persons ==
- David Brooks
- David Cameron
- Doug Wead
- George H.W. Bush
- George W. Bush
- Gerald Ford
- Jack Kemp (later)
- James R. Jones
- John Key
- Lawrence Lindsey
- Marvin Olasky
- Mitt Romney
- Ray Shamie
- Robert Dole
- Steve Forbes
- Ted Cruz (early)
- Vernon Jordan

== See also ==
- Centre-right politics
- Bleeding-heart libertarianism
- Communitarianism
- Humanistic capitalism
- Free-market environmentalism
- One-nation conservatism
- Option for the poor
- Progressive Conservative Party of Canada

== Bibliography ==
- Brooks, Arthur C. (2007). Who Really Cares: The Surprising Truth About Compassionate Conservatism -- America's Charity Divide--Who Gives, Who Do. United Kingdom: Hachette. ISBN 978-0-465-00365-5.
- Heywood, Andrew (2012). Political Ideologies: An Introduction. Palgrave Macmillan. ISBN 978-0-230-36994-8.
- Olasky, Marvin (2000). Compassionate Conservatism: What It Is, What It Does, and How It Can Transform America. Simon and Schuster. ISBN 0-743-20543-X.
- Watts, Duncan (2010). Dictionary of American Government and Politics. Edinburgh University Press. ISBN 978-0-748-63502-3.
