= Retail politics =

Type of political campaigning focused on direct interaction

Retail politics is a type of political campaigning in which politicians directly talk to and interact with their supporters. Examples of retail politics include in-person campaign events, rallies, and direct mail. More recent examples of such campaigning have included candidates' appearances on podcasts. It is often framed as an alternative to "wholesale" politics, in which candidates attempt to reach a large number of potential voters at one time, rather than targeting a smaller number more directly. In the United States, in-person retail politics has become less common in recent years, in large part because of the increasing influence of televised debates between candidates.

== Advantages ==
Supporters of retail politics have argued that it has various advantages for candidates who do it: it makes voters more likely to support those candidates by "humanizing" the candidate to voters, and it allows voters to engage directly with candidates, such as by asking them questions. Some voters in the United States state of New Hampshire, whose presidential primary is viewed as highly significant, have said that being able to see candidates in person, rather than on television, makes them more likely to support the candidate.

Critics of the practice argue that it requires too much time and effort to justify in-person events, since those who attend such events tend to already be politically engaged, and any media coverage generated by the event tends to be limited in its geographic impact. The argument that retail politics is important in New Hampshire specifically has been disputed as well: in 1996, R. Kelly Myers of the University of New Hampshire asserted that "The myth that what matters in New Hampshire is retail politics has largely been a myth for several years."
