= Steve Forbes =

American businessman and publisher (born 1947)

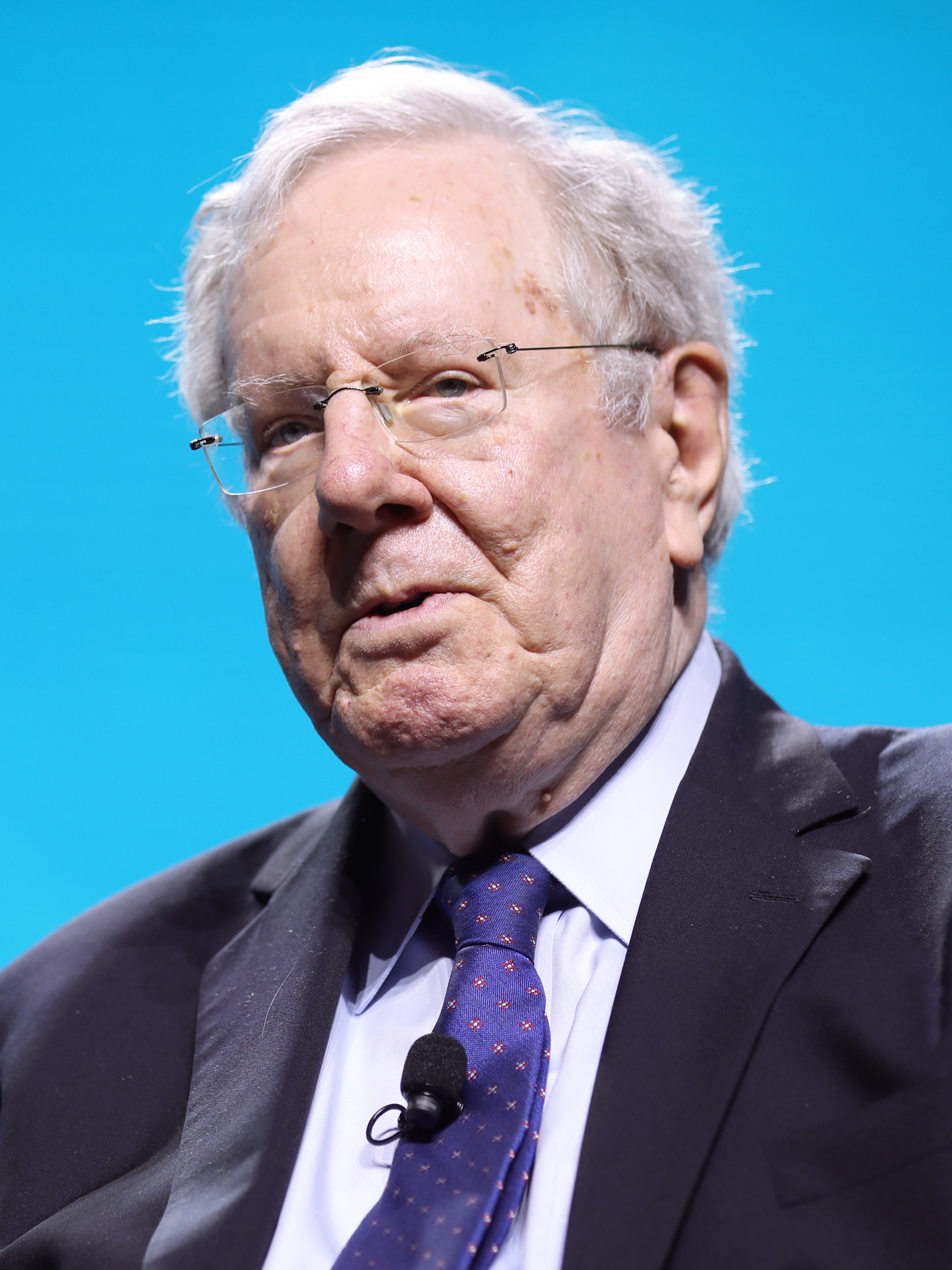
- Forbes in 2024

Chairman of the Board for International Broadcasting
- In office c. 1985 – January 20, 1993
- President: Ronald Reagan; George H. W. Bush
- Preceded by: Frank J. Shakespeare
- Succeeded by: Dan Mica

Personal details
- Born: Malcolm Stevenson Forbes Jr. July 18, 1947 (age 79) Morristown, New Jersey, U.S.
- Party: Republican
- Spouse: Sabina Beekman (m. 1971)
- Children: 5
- Parent: Malcolm Forbes (father)
- Relatives: Forbes family B. C. Forbes (grandfather)
- Education: Princeton University (BA)
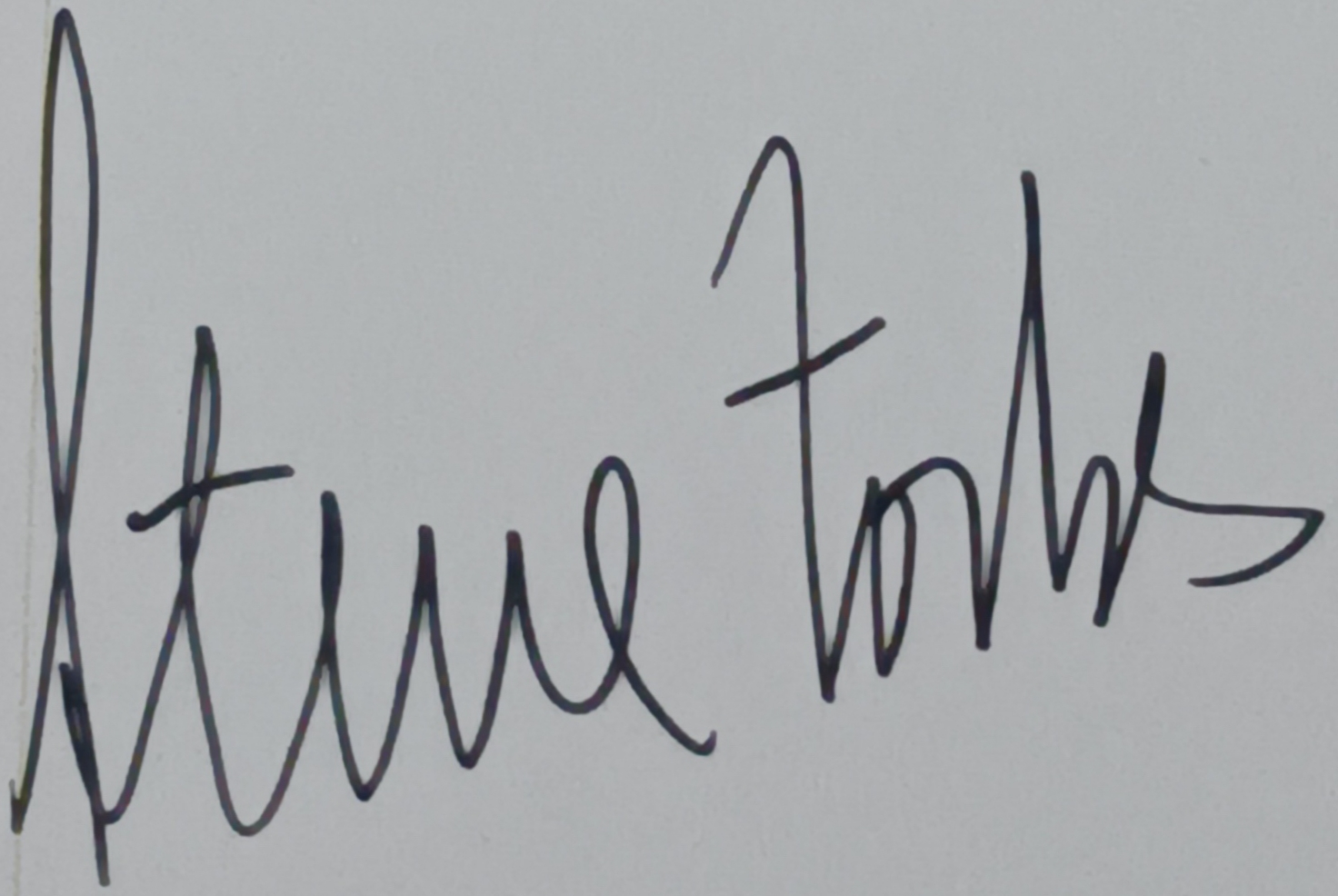
- Signature

Malcolm Stevenson Forbes Jr. (/fɔːrbz/; born July 18, 1947) is an American publisher, businessman, and politician who is the chairman and editor-in-chief of Forbes, the business magazine. The son of longtime Forbes publisher Malcolm Forbes and the grandson of Forbes' founder B.C. Forbes, he is an advisor at the Forbes School of Business & Technology.

Forbes has served as head of the Board of International Broadcasting (BIB), and was a candidate in the 1996 and 2000 Republican presidential primaries and is known for his flat-tax plan which supported a flat tax of 17% on all personal and corporate earned income and keeping the first $33,000 of income exempt. Forbes hosted an episode of Saturday Night Live that aired on April 13, 1996, shortly after dropping out of the race that year. A Princeton graduate like his father, he holds honorary degrees from several universities, including the New York Institute of Technology and Lehigh University.

== Early life and education ==
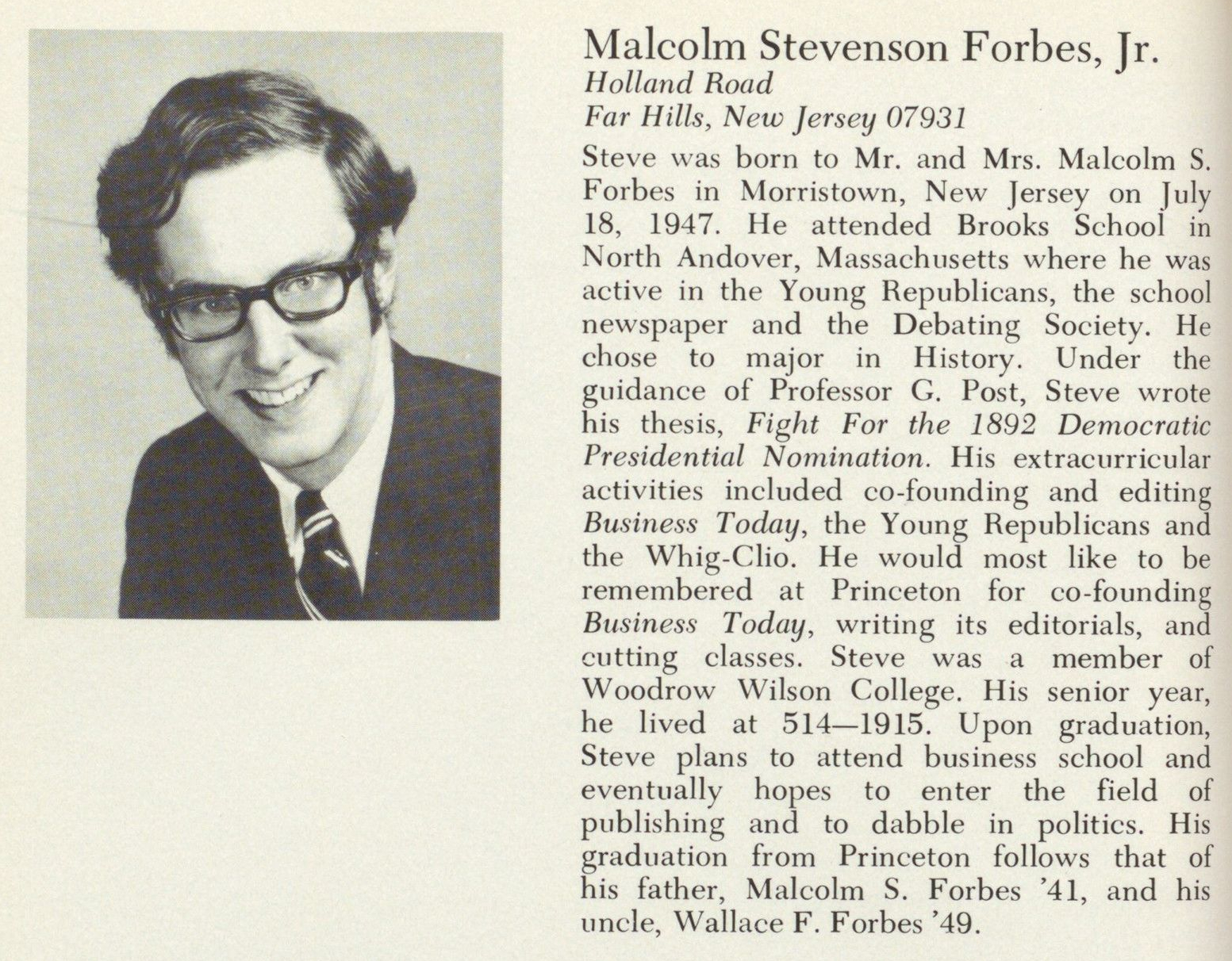
Forbes in the Princeton University yearbook, 1970

Forbes was born in Morristown, New Jersey, to Roberta Remsen (née Laidlaw) and Malcolm Forbes. Forbes grew up in Far Hills, New Jersey and attended the Far Hills Country Day School with his longtime friend and future governor of New Jersey Christine Todd Whitman. He graduated cum laude from Brooks School in North Andover, Massachusetts, in 1966.

Forbes graduated with an A.B. in history from Princeton University in 1970 after completing a 75-page long senior thesis titled "Contest for the 1892 Democratic Presidential Nomination." While at Princeton, Forbes founded his first magazine, Business Today, with two other students. Business Today is currently the largest student-run magazine in the world. Forbes is a member of Alpha Kappa Psi and Tau Kappa Epsilon. He holds honorary degrees from several universities, including the New York Institute of Technology and Lehigh University.

== Political career and views ==
=== Early political career ===
In 1985, President Ronald Reagan appointed Forbes as head of the Board of International Broadcasting (BIB), which historically managed the operation of Radio Free Europe/Radio Liberty. Reagan's successor, George H. W. Bush reappointed Forbes to the position. Forbes would continue to serve as the BIB's leader until 1993, following the inauguration of Bill Clinton.

Following his career as the BIB's head, Forbes went on to get involved in various conservative political advocacy groups. From 1993 to 1996, Forbes was the chairman of the Board of Directors of "Empower America", which later merged with the advocacy group FreedomWorks. Through "Empower America", Forbes became associates with prominent conservative politician Jack Kemp, who would go on to endorse Forbes during the 1996 Republican Party presidential primaries. From 1996 to 1999, Forbes also served as honorary chairman of the advocacy group "Americans for Hope, Growth and Opportunity", described as "a grassroots, issues-advocacy organization founded to advance pro-growth, pro-freedom and pro-family issues."

Forbes helped craft Christine Todd Whitman's plan for a 30% cut in New Jersey's income tax over three years, and this plan proved to be a major factor in her victory over incumbent Governor James Florio. Despite Forbes and Whitman being childhood friends, Forbes would later distance himself from Whitman during his bid for the Republican nomination in 2000 owing to Whitman's pro-choice stance on abortion.

=== Campaigns for U.S. president ===
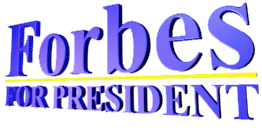
Logo from 1996 campaign

Forbes entered the Republican primaries for President of the United States in 1996 and 2000, primarily running on a campaign to establish a flat income tax Forbes believed the American taxation system had become too Byzantine and bureaucratic and was in desperate need of reform and simplification.

When Forbes ran for president in 1996 and 2000, he sold some of his Forbes, Inc. voting shares to other family members to help finance his run. Forbes did not come close to securing the Republican nomination, despite winning the Arizona and Delaware primaries in 1996 and getting some significant shares of the vote in other primaries. Forbes's "awkward" campaigning style was considered to be a major factor in his defeat. Time Magazine called his stumping a "comedy-club impression of what would happen if some mad scientist decided to construct a dork robot." Jeff Lyon of The Chicago Tribune wrote of Forbes on the campaign trail, "[Forbes] resembles the classic milquetoast, with a prissy smile, gold-rimmed glasses that make his eyes look smaller, and a stiff way of presenting himself when he works a crowd. He has a cornball style and uses preppie slang like 'get real' and 'el zippo' (meaning zero) in speeches." Forbes and his campaign staff were known for travelling between campaign stops via their "big silver bus." For his 2000 presidential campaign, he raised $86 million in campaign contributions, of which $37 million was self-donated.

Logo from 2000 campaign

After dropping out early in the 2000 primary season, Forbes returned to heading the magazine and company. During the 1996 campaign, insiders at Fortune alleged that stories about Forbes's advertisers became favorably biased toward them.

Major issues Forbes has supported include free trade, health savings accounts, and allowing people to opt out 75% of Social Security payroll taxes into personal retirement accounts (PRAs). Forbes supports traditional Republican Party policies such as downsizing government agencies to balance the budget, tough crime laws, support for the death penalty, and school vouchers. Forbes opposes gun control and most government regulation of the environment, as well as drug legalization and same-sex marriage, in spite of his father being gay.

Forbes's flat-tax plan has changed slightly. In 1996, Forbes supported a flat tax of 17% on all personal and corporate earned income (unearned income such as capital gains, pensions, inheritance, and savings would be exempt). However, Forbes supported keeping the first $33,000 of income exempt. In 2000, Forbes maintained the same plan; however, instead of each person receiving an exemption of $33,000, it more closely resembled the Armey Plan (Forbes's version called for a $13,000-per-adult and $5,000-per-dependent deduction). Forbes is very wealthy, with a net worth in 1996 of $430 million.

In his 2000 campaign, Forbes professed his support for social conservatism along with his supply-side economics. Despite holding opposite positions in 1996, for the 2000 campaign Forbes announced he was adamantly opposed to abortion and supported prayer in public schools. The previous year Forbes had issued a statement saying he would no longer donate money to Princeton University because of its hiring of philosopher Peter Singer, who views personhood as being limited to 'sentient' beings and therefore considers some disabled people and all infants to lack this status. Steve Forbes was one of the signers of the Statement of Principles of Project for the New American Century (PNAC) on June 3, 1997.

=== Other political activities ===
In 1996, Forbes campaigned on behalf of Ron Paul in the congressional election for Texas's 14th congressional district.

Actor Mark McKinney played Steve Forbes on the comedy television show Saturday Night Live, a program known for featuring political satire. In an episode which aired on March 16, 1996—shortly after Forbes dropped out of the 1996 presidential race—McKinney played Forbes in a skit in which Forbes purchases land in Russia to found his own country, called "Forbes America". Forbes himself hosted an episode of Saturday Night Live that aired on April 13, 1996. The episode featured a skit in which Forbes earnestly wishes to answer the questions of potential voters, but all the questions he receives instead have to do with his enormous personal wealth (for example, with regards to the then ongoing war in Bosnia, Forbes is asked by an audience member, "Why don't you just buy Bosnia and tell all those people over there that if they don't stop fighting you'll just, you know, throw them the hell out?"). On that same episode, Forbes starred in a skit, playing a roofer, the comedy deriving from Forbes's character being a tough blue collar worker, a personality which clashes with Forbes's nerdy, intellectual demeanor and appearance. The episode also featured a skit where the real Forbes interviewed his SNL counterpart, played by McKinney.

In December 2006, Forbes joined the Board of Directors of the advocacy organization FreedomWorks. Forbes is also on the board of directors of the National Taxpayers Union. Forbes is also a member of the board of trustees of The Heritage Foundation, an influential Washington, D.C.–based public policy research institute. Forbes is a frequent panelist on the television program Forbes on Fox, which also features members of the Forbes magazine staff and is shown Saturday mornings on Fox News Channel at 11:00 a.m. EST.

On March 28, 2007, Forbes joined Rudy Giuliani's campaign for the 2008 presidential election, serving as a National Co-Chair and Senior Policy Advisor. Later in the 2008 presidential campaign, Forbes served as John McCain's economic adviser on taxes, energy and the budget during McCain's bid for the 2008 presidential election.

In March 2013, Forbes participated in an NPR broadcast Intelligence Squared debate with James Grant, Frederic Mishkin and John R. Taylor Jr. concerning the motion "Does America Need A Strong Dollar Policy?".

Forbes endorsed Donald Trump in the 2016 United States presidential election.

== Personal life ==
In 1971, he married Sabina Beekman. They have five daughters, including Moira Forbes. Forbes appeared alongside his family on Larry King Live during his 1996 presidential campaign. Forbes has been a resident of Bedminster, New Jersey.

Forbes rides Amtrak trains and was a passenger on board the 2016 Chester, Pennsylvania, train derailment.

== Bibliography ==
- Forbes, Steve (1999). The New Birth of Freedom: Vision for America. Washington, DC: Regnery Publishing. p. 204. ISBN 978-0895263209. OCLC 475198964.
- Forbes, Steve (2005). Flat Tax Revolution: Using a Postcard to Abolish the IRS. Washington, DC: Regnery Publishing. p. 216. ISBN 978-0895260406. OCLC 60558651.
- Forbes, Steve (2012). Freedom Manifesto: Why Free Markets Are Moral and Big Government Isn't. Crown Business Publishing. p. 304. ISBN 978-0307951571.
- Forbes, Steve; Ames, Elizabeth (2014). Money: How the Destruction of the Dollar Threatens the Global Economy – and What We Can Do About It. ISBN 9780071823708.
- Forbes, Steve; Ames, Elizabeth (2015). Reviving America: How Repealing Obamacare, Replacing the Tax Code and Reforming The Fed will Restore Hope and Prosperity. McGraw-Hill Education. p. 224. ISBN 978-1259641121.
- Forbes, Steve; Lewis, Nathan; Ames, Elizabeth (2022). Inflation: What It Is, Why It's Bad, and How to Fix It. Encounter Books. p. 193. ISBN 978-1641772440.
