= George W. Bush presidential campaign =

George W. Bush, the 43rd President of the United States, has run successfully for president twice:

- George W. Bush 2000 presidential campaign
- George W. Bush 2004 presidential campaign
