= 2000 Republican Party vice presidential candidate selection =

2000 Republican vice presidential nomination
- July 25, 2000
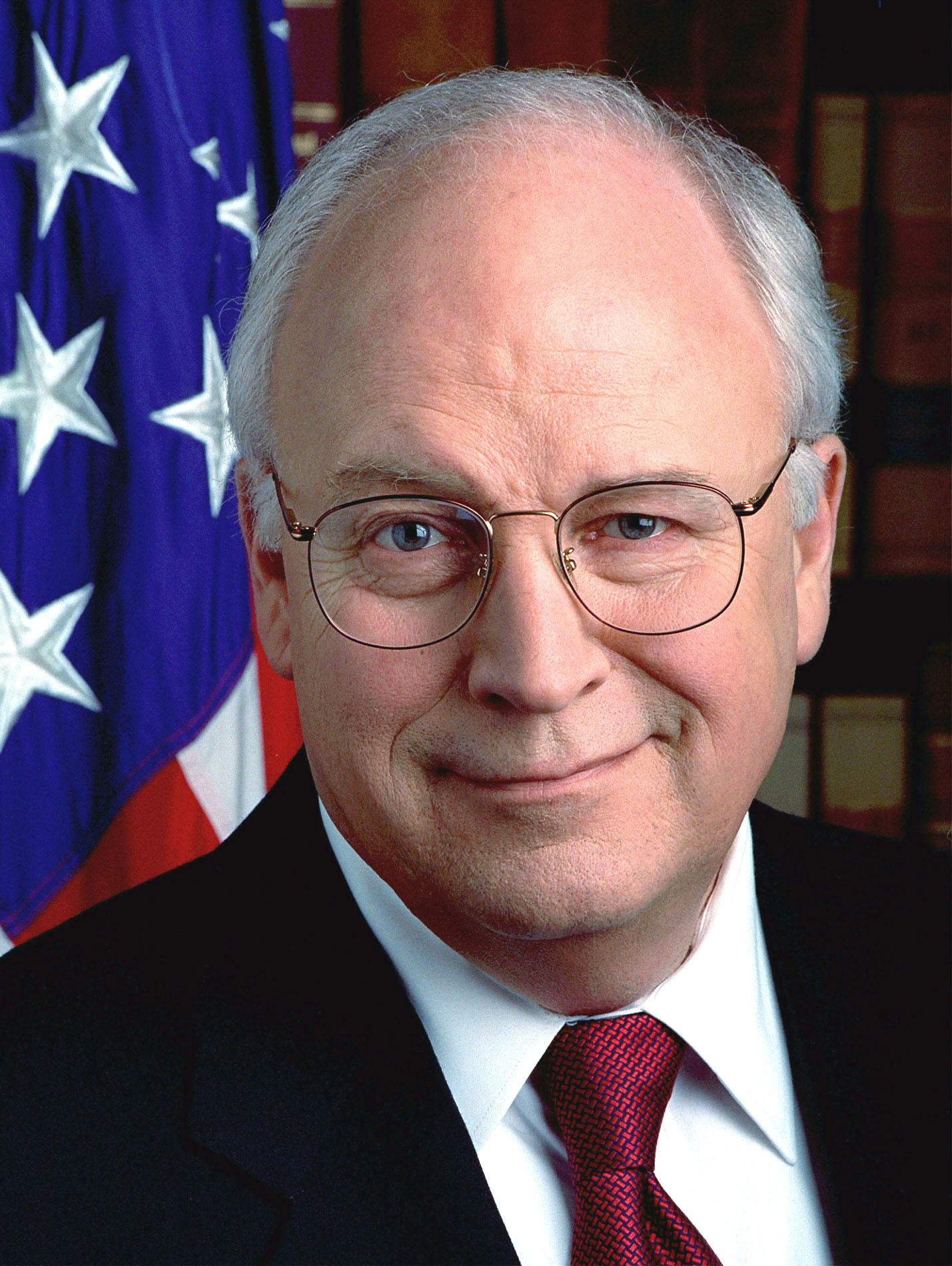
Nominee	Dick Cheney
Home state	Wyoming
Previous Vice Presidential nominee
Jack Kemp
Vice Presidential nominee
Dick Cheney

This article lists those who were potential candidates for the Republican nomination for Vice President of the United States in the 2000 election. On March 7, 2000, Texas Governor George W. Bush won the 2000 Republican nomination for President of the United States, and became the presumptive nominee. On July 25, 2000, former Secretary of Defense Richard B. Cheney was chosen as his running mate. Bush initially wanted Cheney to only find him a running mate. However, as they were running out of time, Bush changed his mind to make Cheney his running mate.

The Bush–Cheney ticket would go on to defeat the Democratic tickets of Gore–Lieberman in 2000 and Kerry–Edwards in 2004 in both close elections.

== Selection process ==
Bush had initially chosen Dick Cheney to lead the search for his vice presidential running mate. In 1992, Bush had supported Cheney as a replacement for Dan Quayle on his father's ultimately unsuccessful national ticket. After more than three months of extensive research, Cheney recommended John Danforth to be the nominee, as the other choices' strengths were offset by liberal stances. Bush heavily considered Danforth. However, Danforth, who wanted to continue living mainly in Missouri, formally declined to run as vice president on July 11, 2000; nevertheless Danforth would eventually be appointed to the Bush Administration as a special envoy to Sudan on September 6, 2001. Bush ultimately asked Cheney himself to be the nominee. It was acknowledged in a July 28, 2000 New York Times article that the decision to select Cheney as Bush's Vice Presidential nominee was in fact secretly made "weeks" before it was formally announced on July 25, 2000.

According to the Twelfth Amendment to the United States Constitution, the presidential electors from Texas (in the United States Electoral College) could not vote for candidates for president and vice president who were both from Texas. On July 21, 2000, Cheney changed his voter registration from Texas to Teton County, Wyoming, which, combined with other actions, ultimately allowed the Texas electors to vote for both Bush and Cheney.

By picking Cheney, Bush had a running mate who had years of experience as well as an extensive foreign policy expertise. After Cheney, who was CEO of Halliburton, reported his findings back to Bush, Bush surprised pundits by asking Cheney himself to be his running mate. Bush told supporters that regional considerations would have less bearing on his decision than the candidate's ability to take over the office of the presidency. At the selection announcement, Bush said that Cheney, who had worked under all five presidential administrations between 1969 and 1993, was qualified, respected and shared his vision for America.

There was a short-lived movement to draft Elizabeth Dole, but that effort did not move forward.

=== Shortlist ===
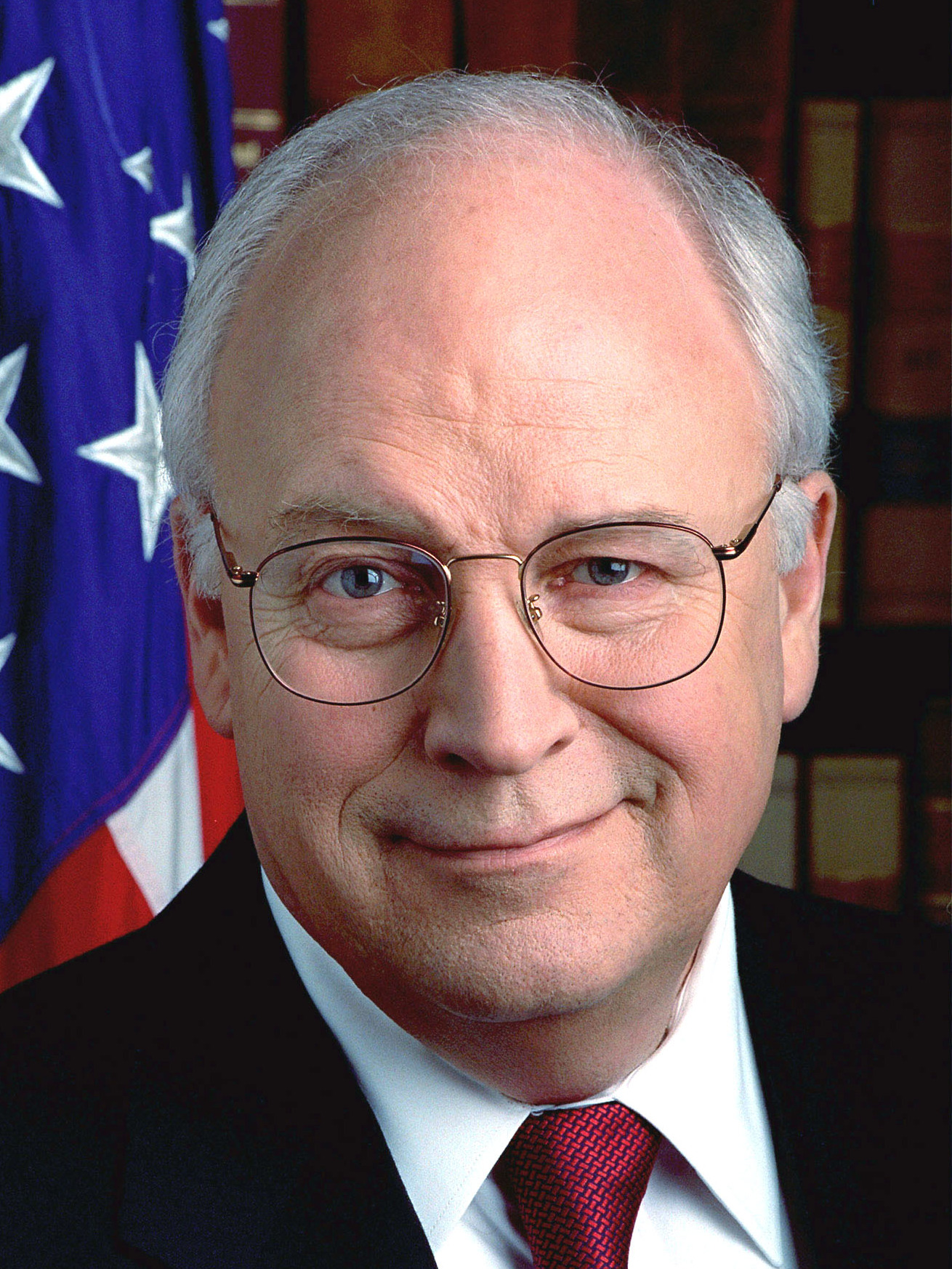
Former Secretary of Defense
Dick Cheney
from Wyoming
(1989–1993)

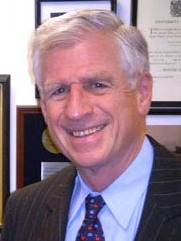
Former Senator
John Danforth
from Missouri
(1976–1995)

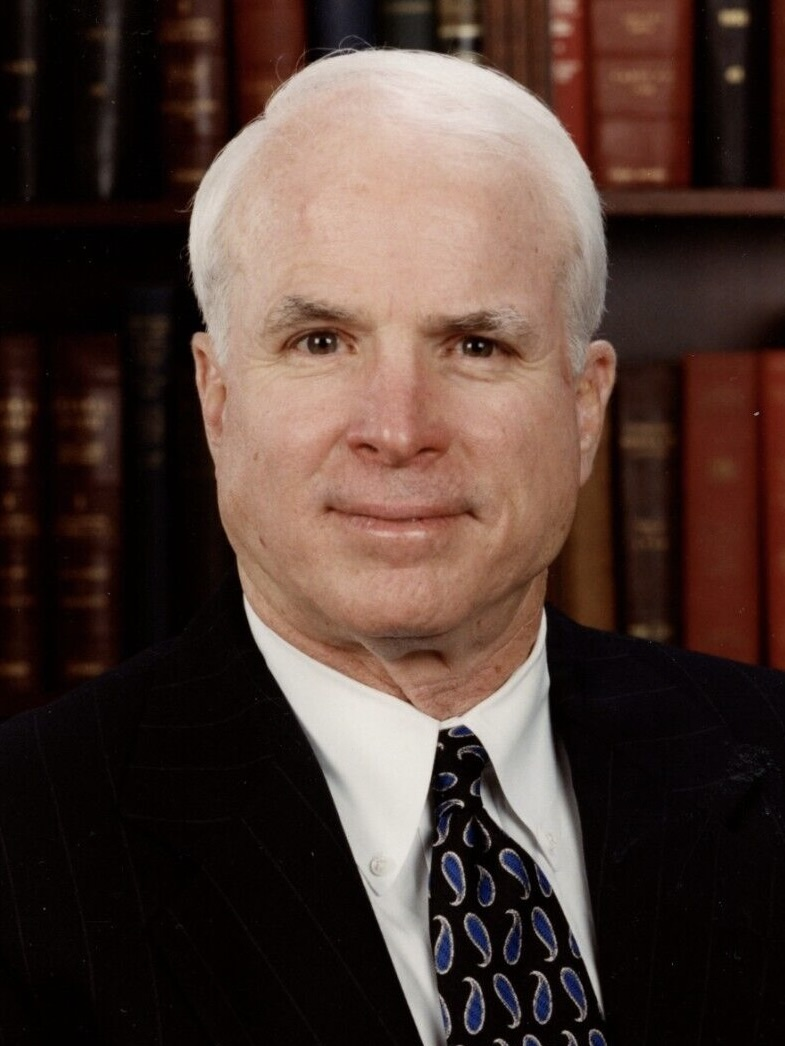
Senator and 2000 presidential candidate
John McCain
from Arizona
(1987–2018)

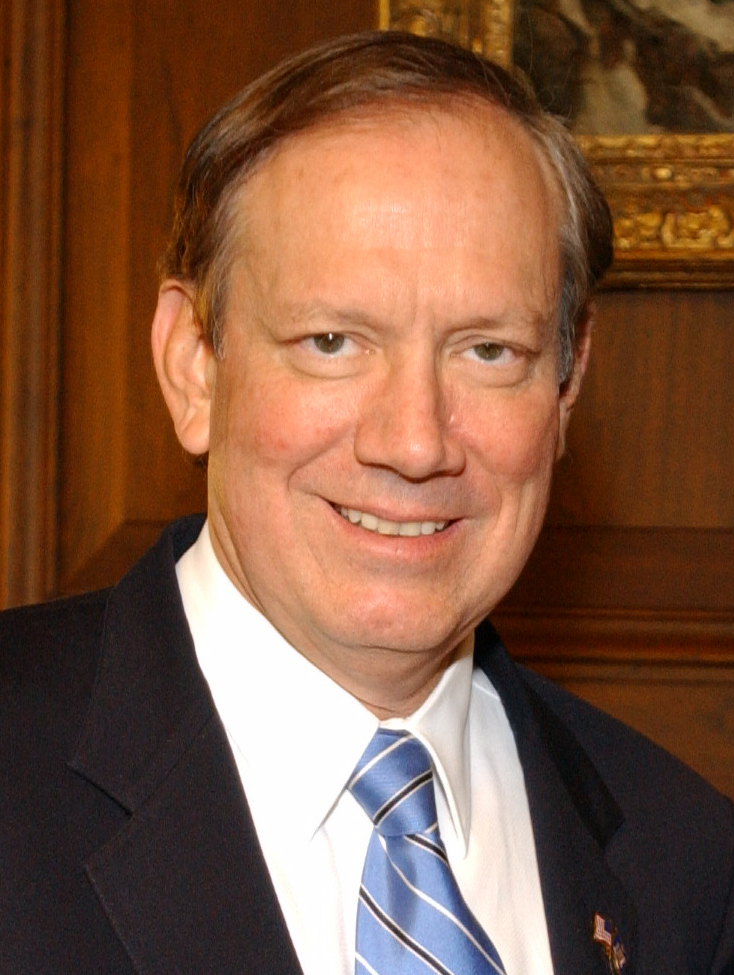
Governor
George Pataki
of New York
(1995–2006)

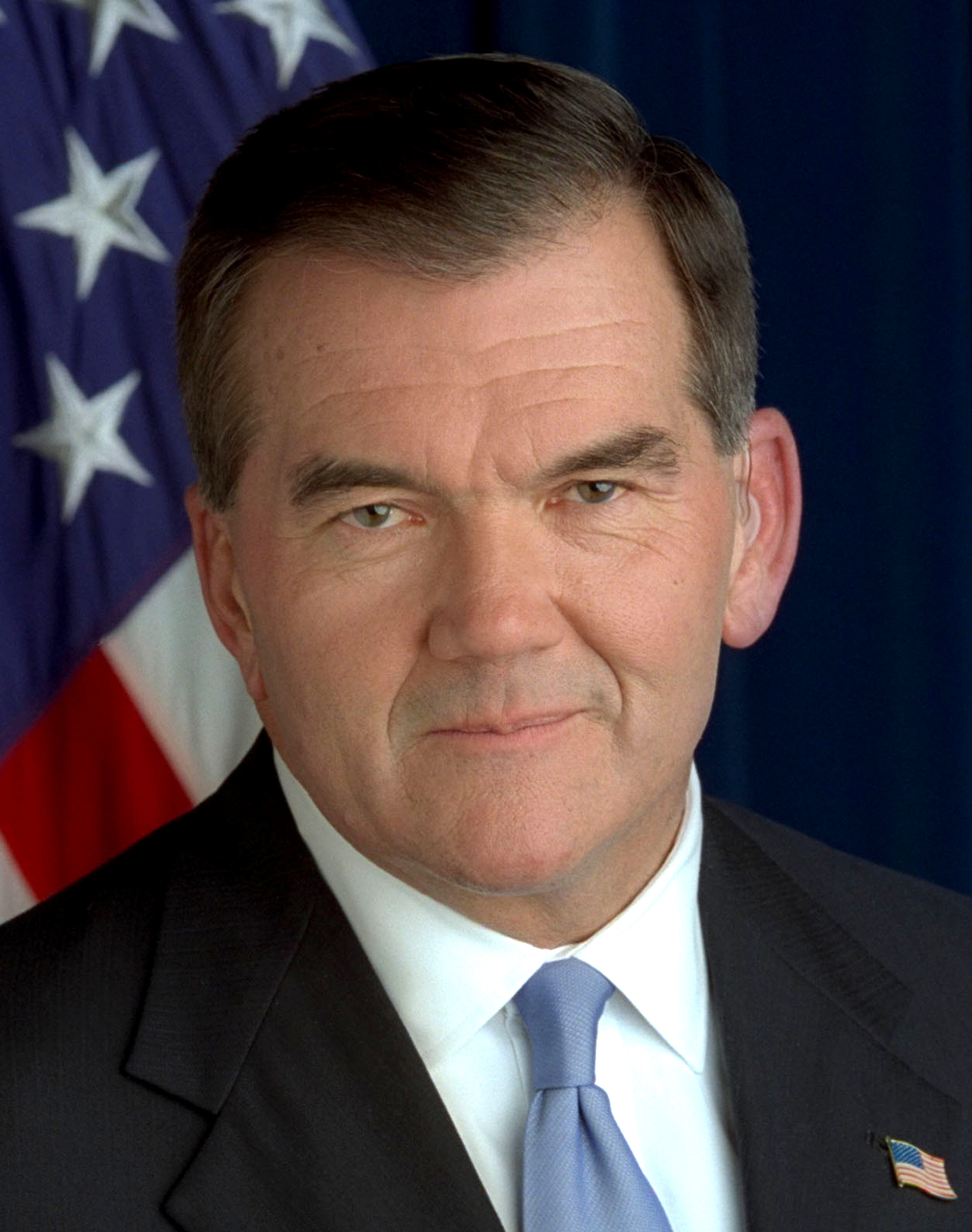
Governor
Tom Ridge
of Pennsylvania
(1995–2001)

=== Media speculation on possible running mates ===
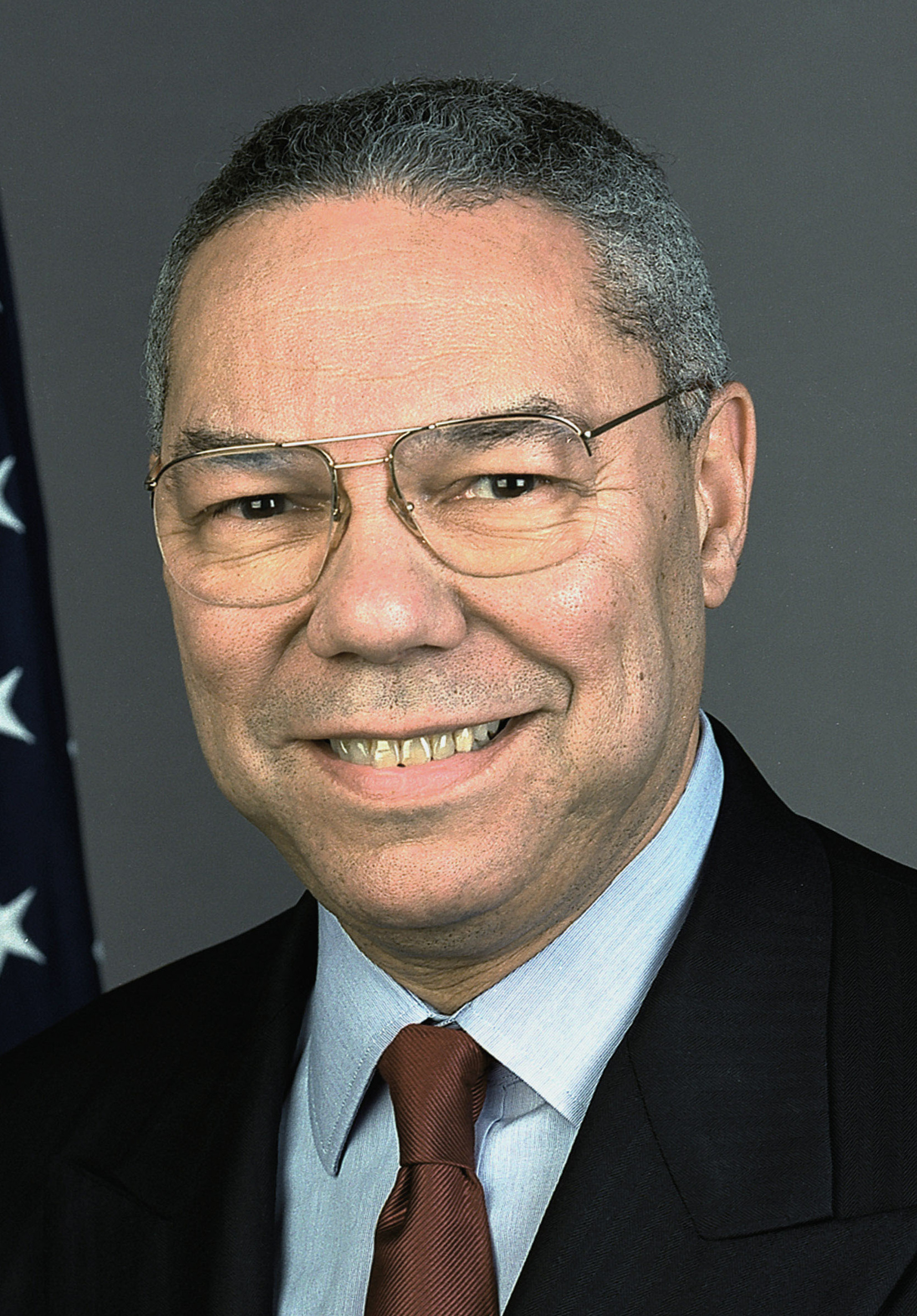
Former Chairman of the Joint Chiefs of Staff
Colin Powell
from Virginia
(1989–1993)

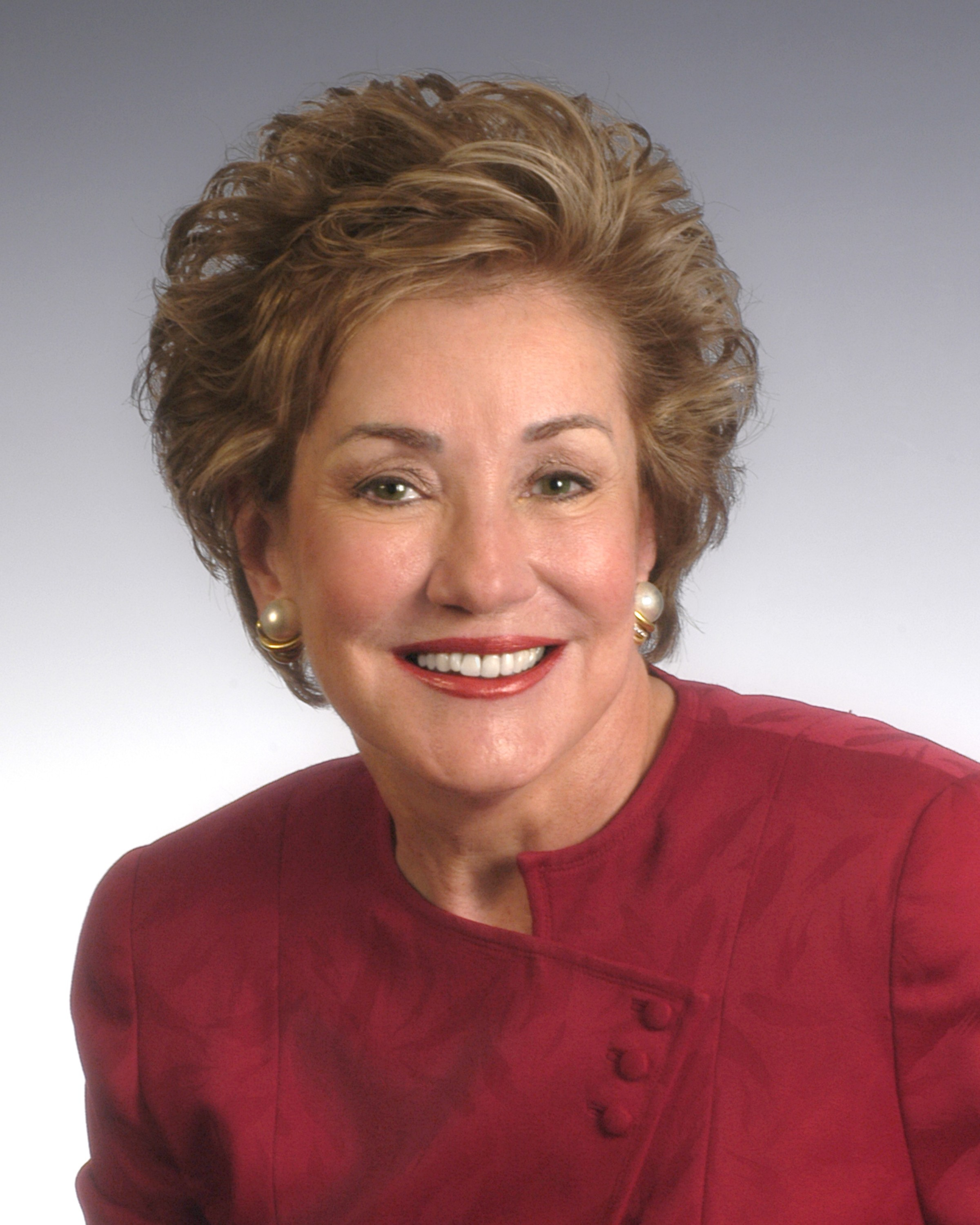
Former United States Secretary of Labor
Elizabeth Dole
from North Carolina
(1989–1990)

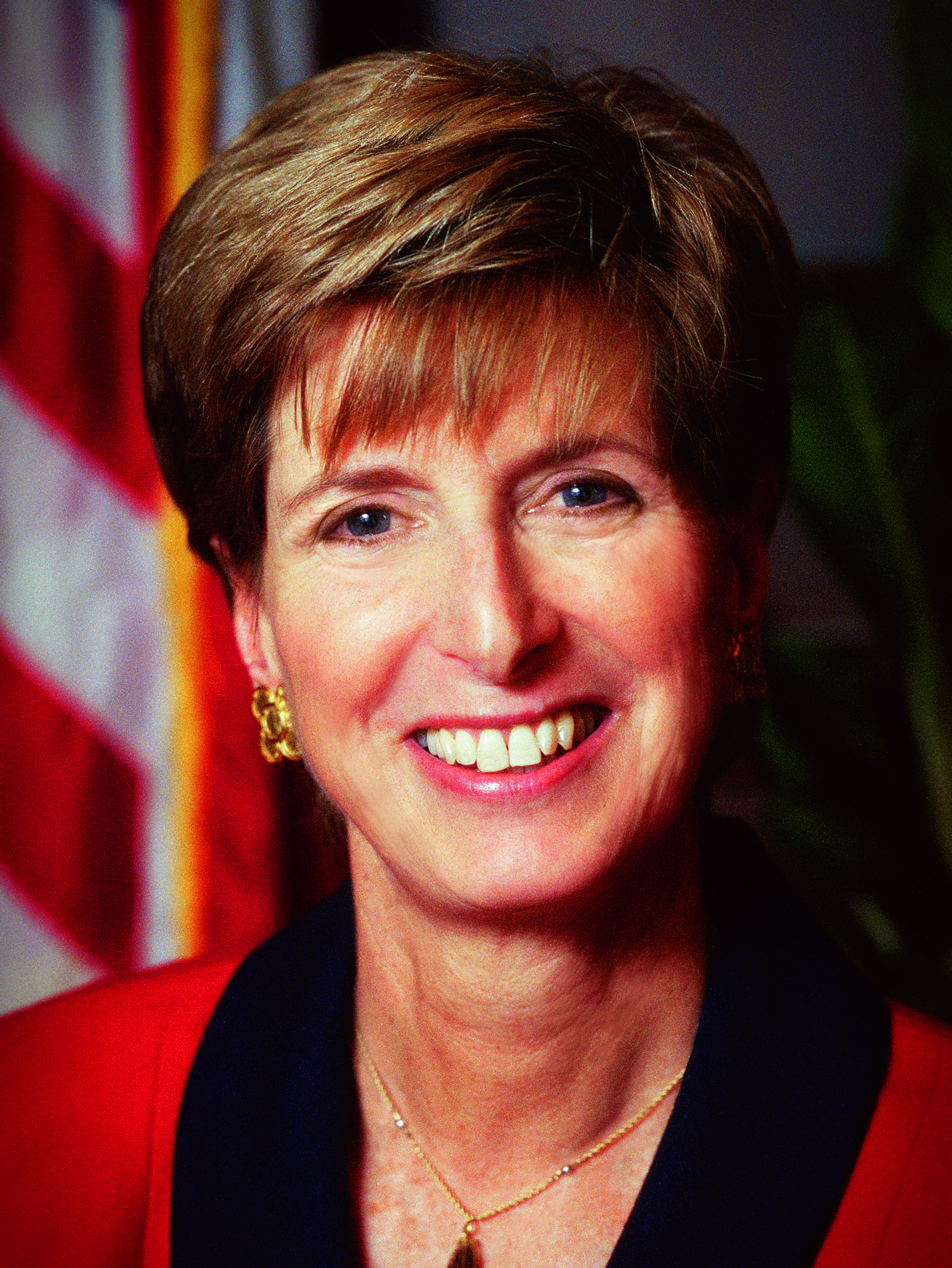
Governor
Christine Todd Whitman
of New Jersey
(1994–2001)

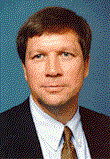
Representative
John Kasich
from Ohio
(1983–2001)

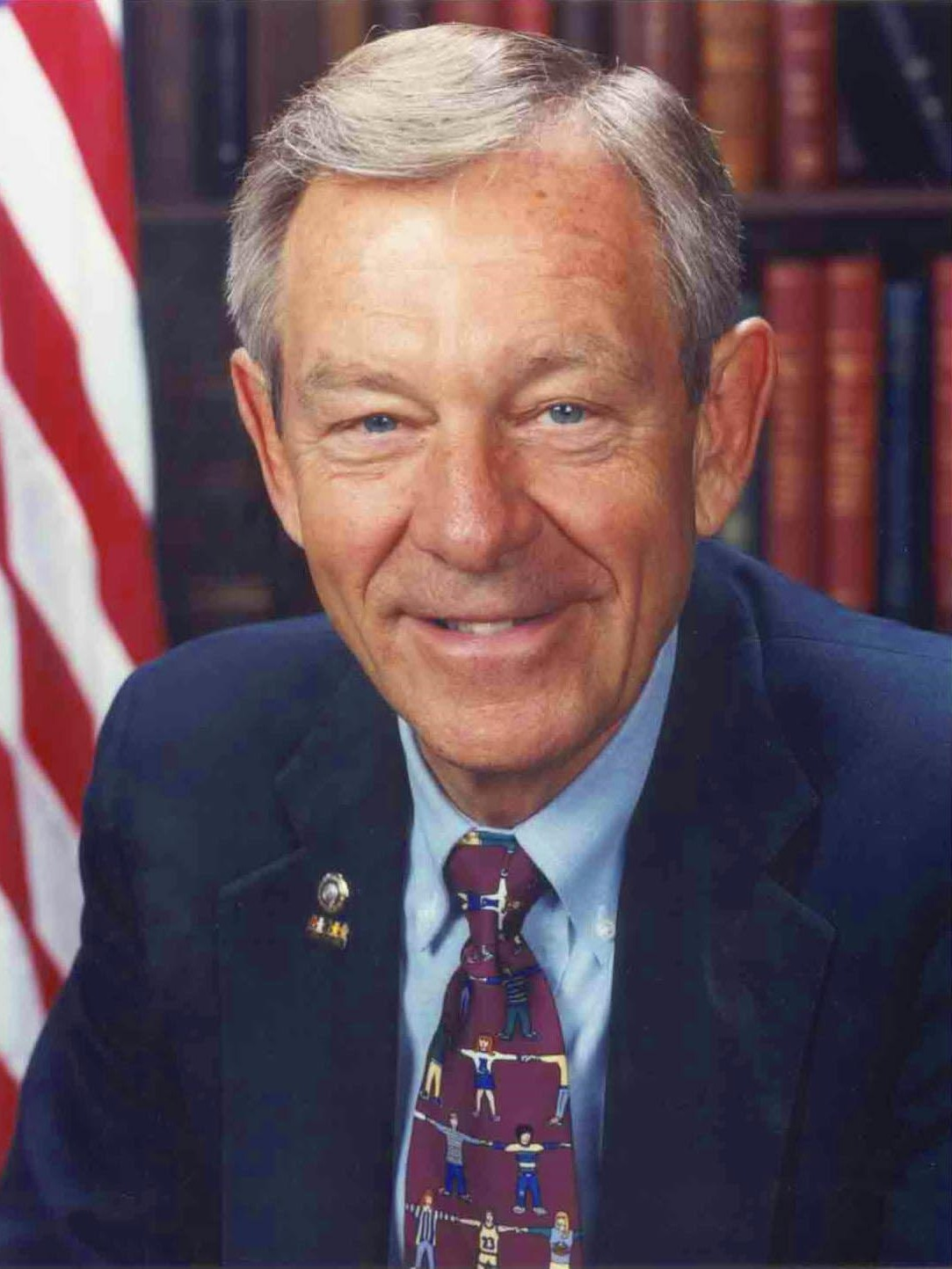
Senator
George Voinovich
from Ohio
(1999–2011)

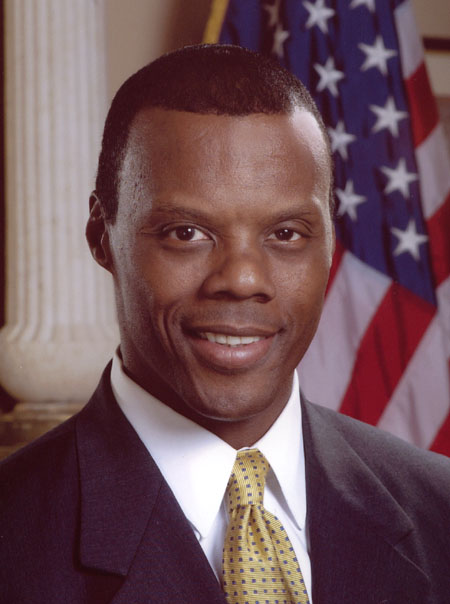
Representative
J. C. Watts
from Oklahoma
(1995–2003)

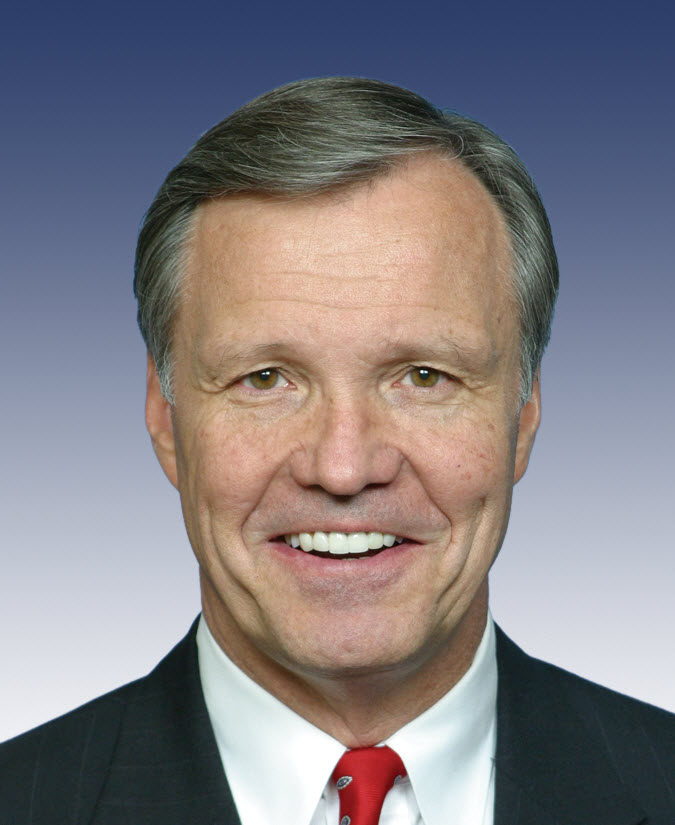
Representative
Christopher Cox
from California
(1989–2005)

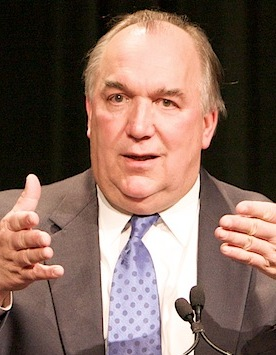
Governor
John Engler
of Michigan
(1991–2003)

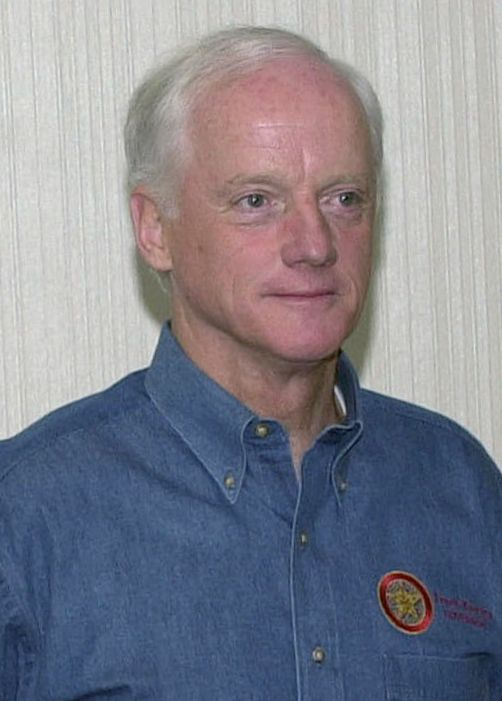
Governor
Frank Keating
of Oklahoma
(1995–2003)

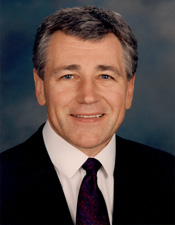
Senator
Chuck Hagel
from Nebraska
(1997–2009)

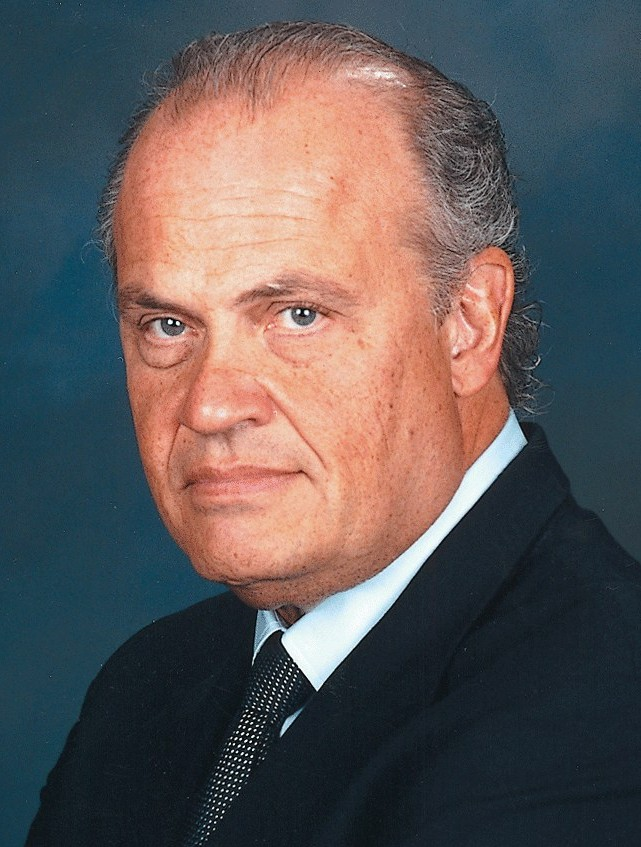
Senator
Fred Thompson
from Tennessee
(1994–2003)

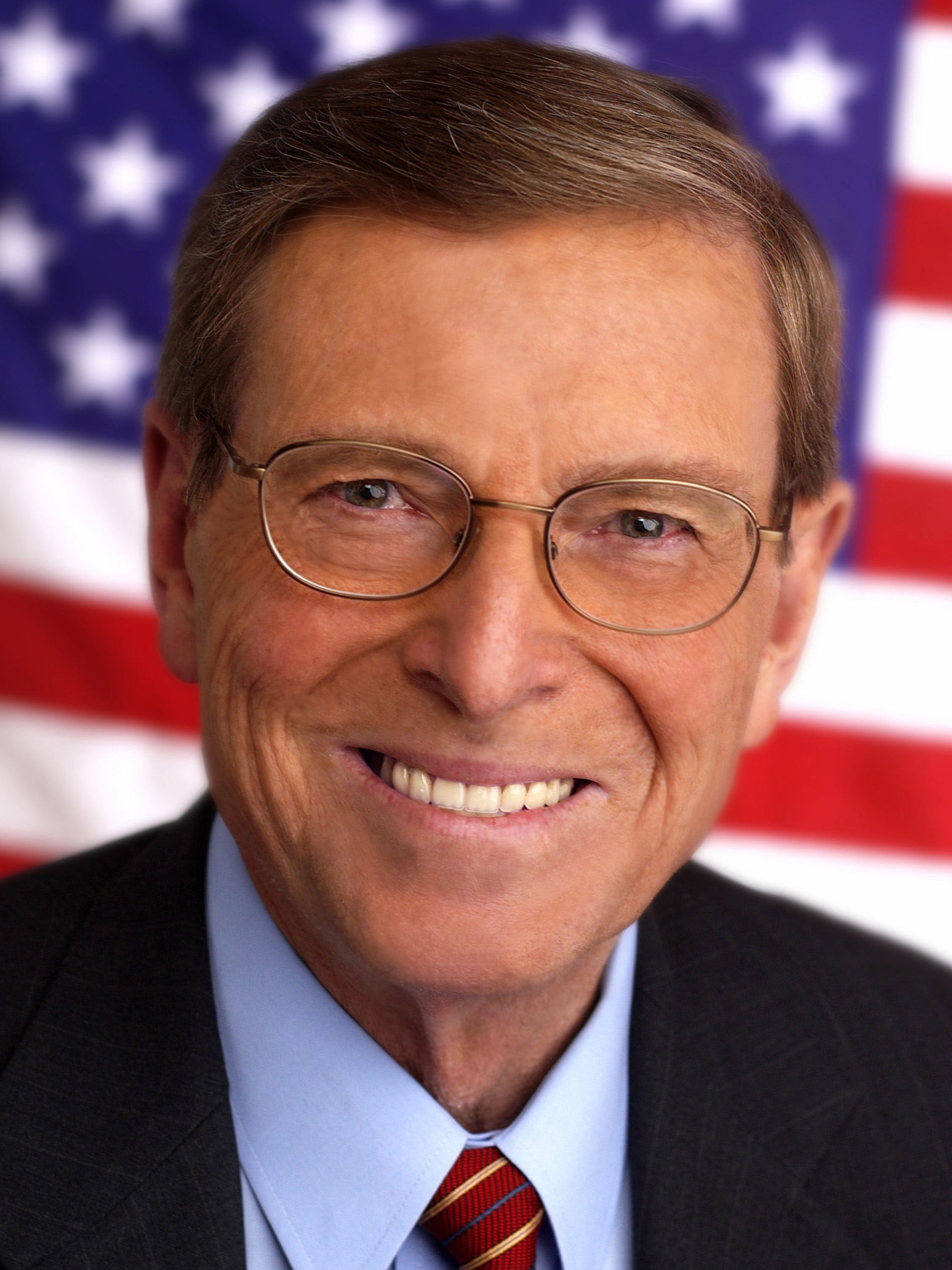
Senator
Pete Domenici
from New Mexico
(1973–2009)

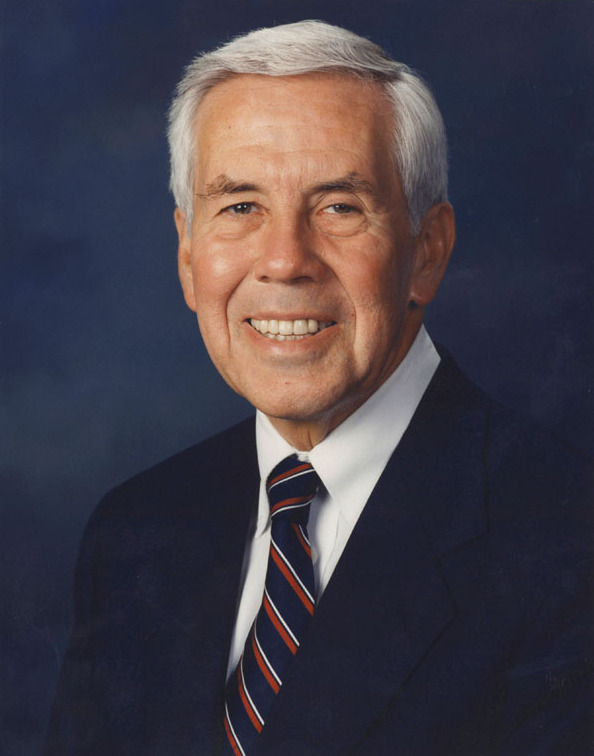
Senator
Richard Lugar
from Indiana
(1977–2013)

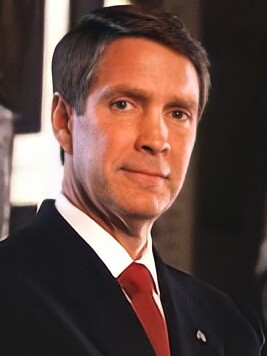
Senator
Bill Frist
from Tennessee
(1995–2007)

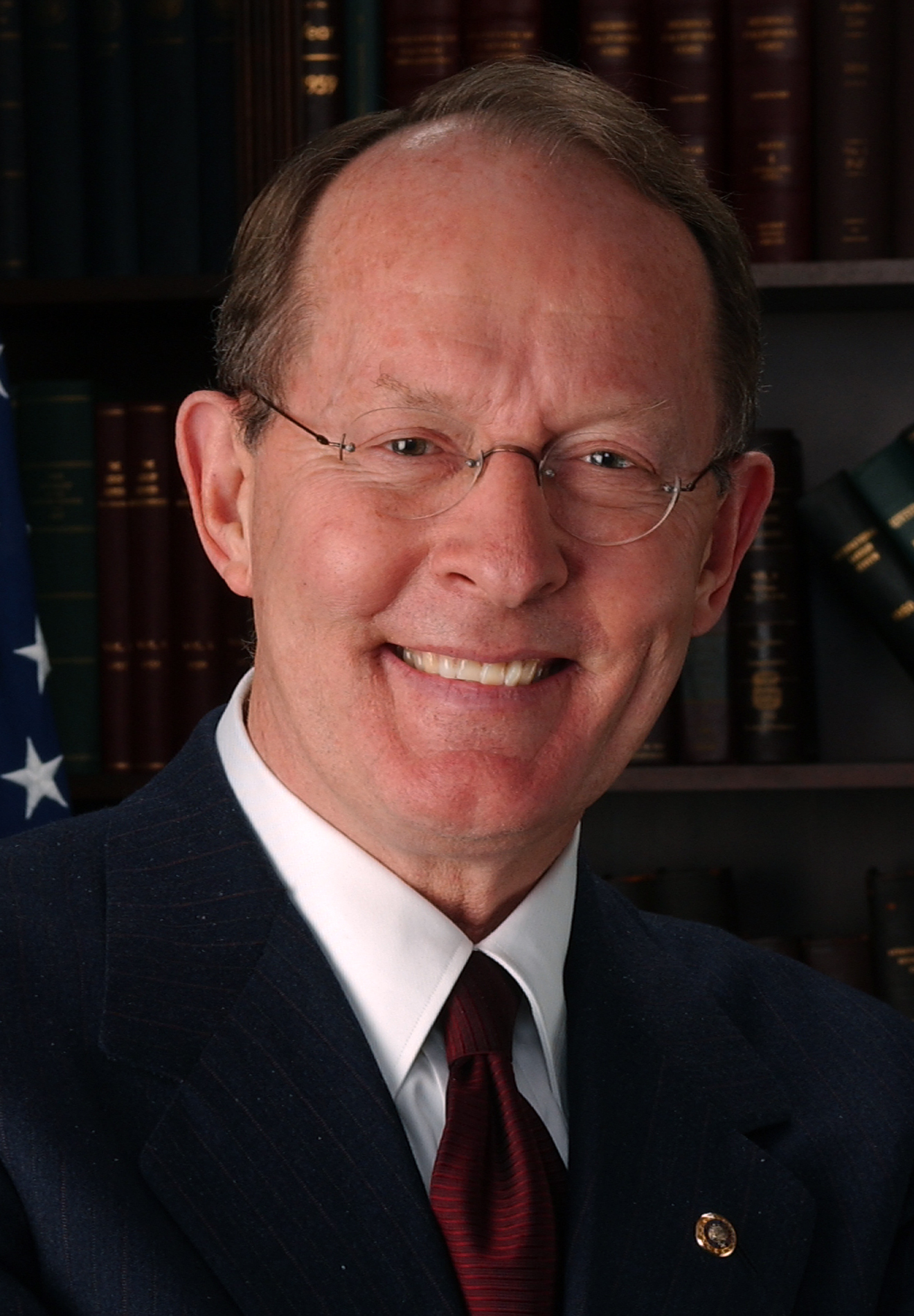
Former Secretary of Education
Lamar Alexander
from Tennessee
(1991–1993)

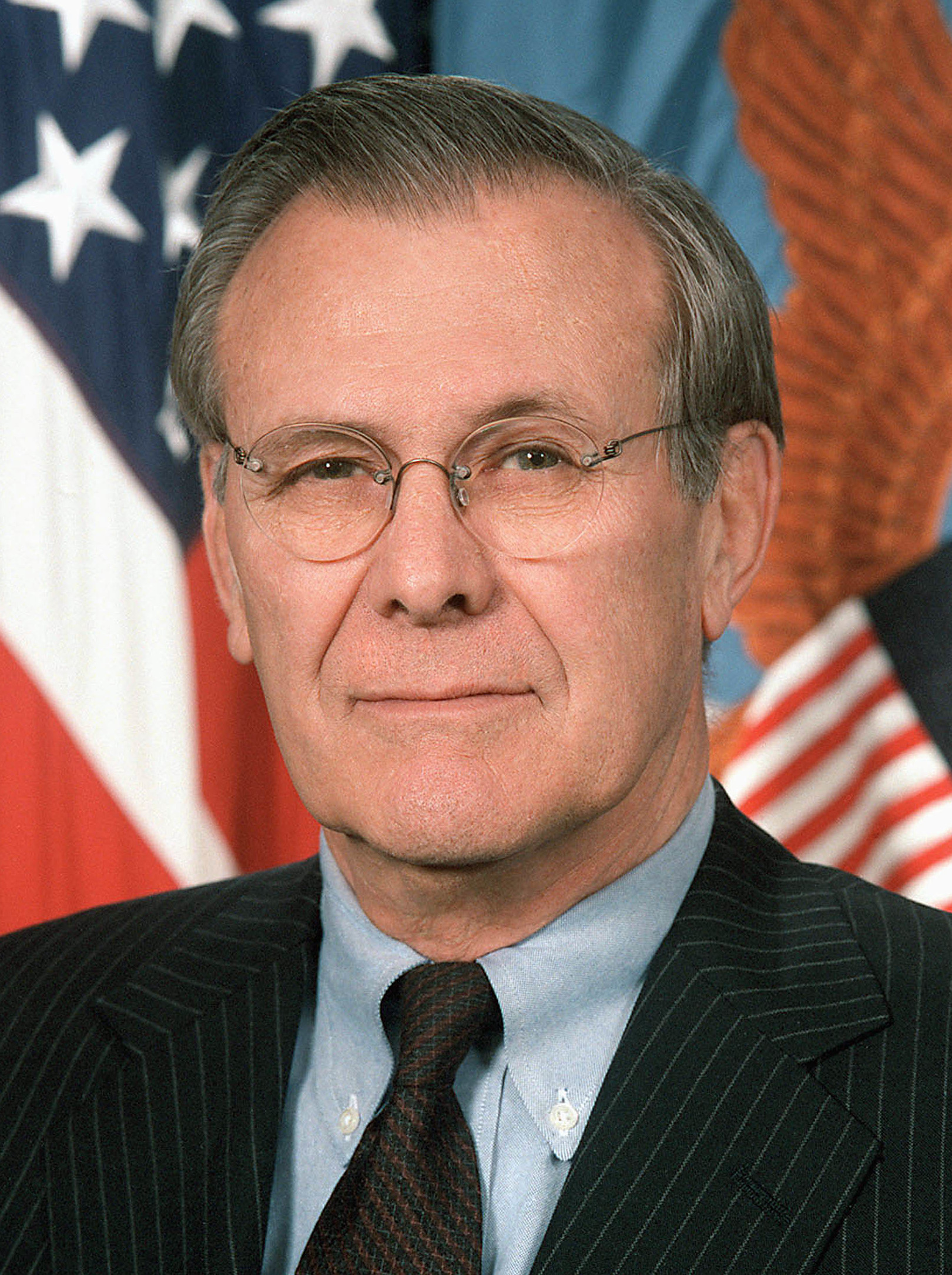
Former Secretary of Defense
Donald Rumsfeld
from Illinois
(1975–1977)

== See also ==
- George W. Bush 2000 presidential campaign
- 2000 Republican Party presidential primaries
- 2000 Republican National Convention
- 2000 United States presidential election
- List of United States major party presidential tickets
