= First inauguration of George W. Bush =

54th United States presidential inauguration

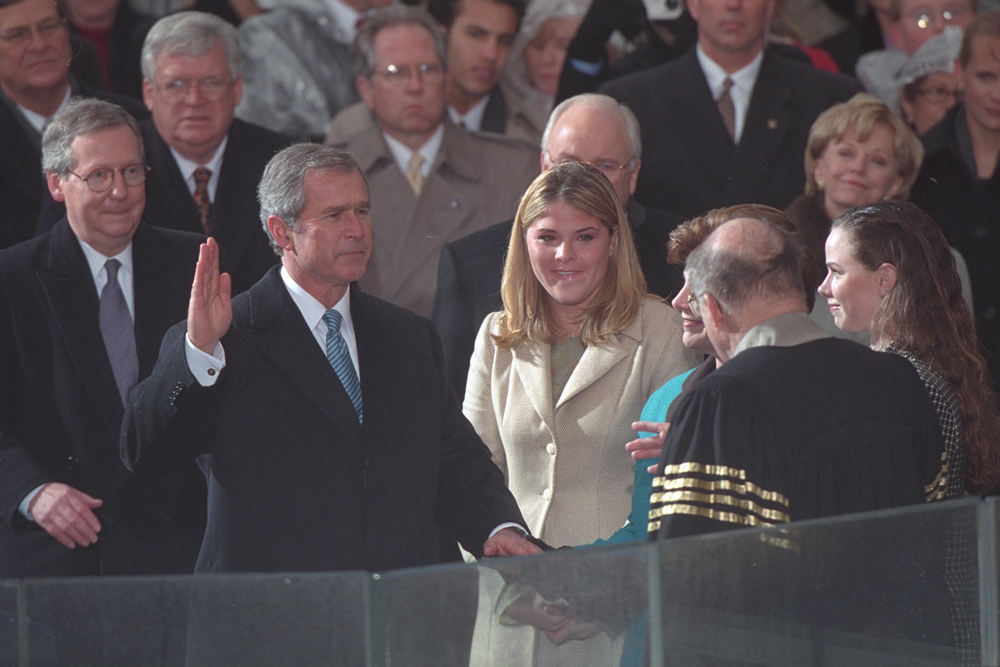
- George W. Bush takes the oath of office as the 43rd president of the United States
- Date: January 20, 2001; 25 years ago
- Location: United States Capitol, Washington, D.C.
- Organized by: Joint Congressional Committee on Inaugural Ceremonies
- Participants: George W. Bush; 43rd president of the United States — Assuming office Dick Cheney; 46th vice president of the United States — Assuming office William Rehnquist; Chief Justice of the United States — Administering oaths

The first inauguration of George W. Bush as the 43rd president of the United States took place on Saturday, January 20, 2001, at the West Front of the United States Capitol in Washington, D.C. This was the 54th inauguration and marked the commencement of the first term of George W. Bush as president and Dick Cheney as vice president. Chief Justice William Rehnquist administered the presidential oath of office at 12:01 p.m., after he administered the vice presidential oath of office as well. An estimated 300,000 people attended the swearing-in ceremony. This was the first presidential inauguration to take place in the 21st century, and the first in the 3rd millennium.

Weather conditions for 12 noon at Ronald Reagan Washington National Airport, located 3.1 miles from the ceremony, were: 36 °F (2 °C), wind 12 mph, and cloudy.

== Pre-inaugural events ==
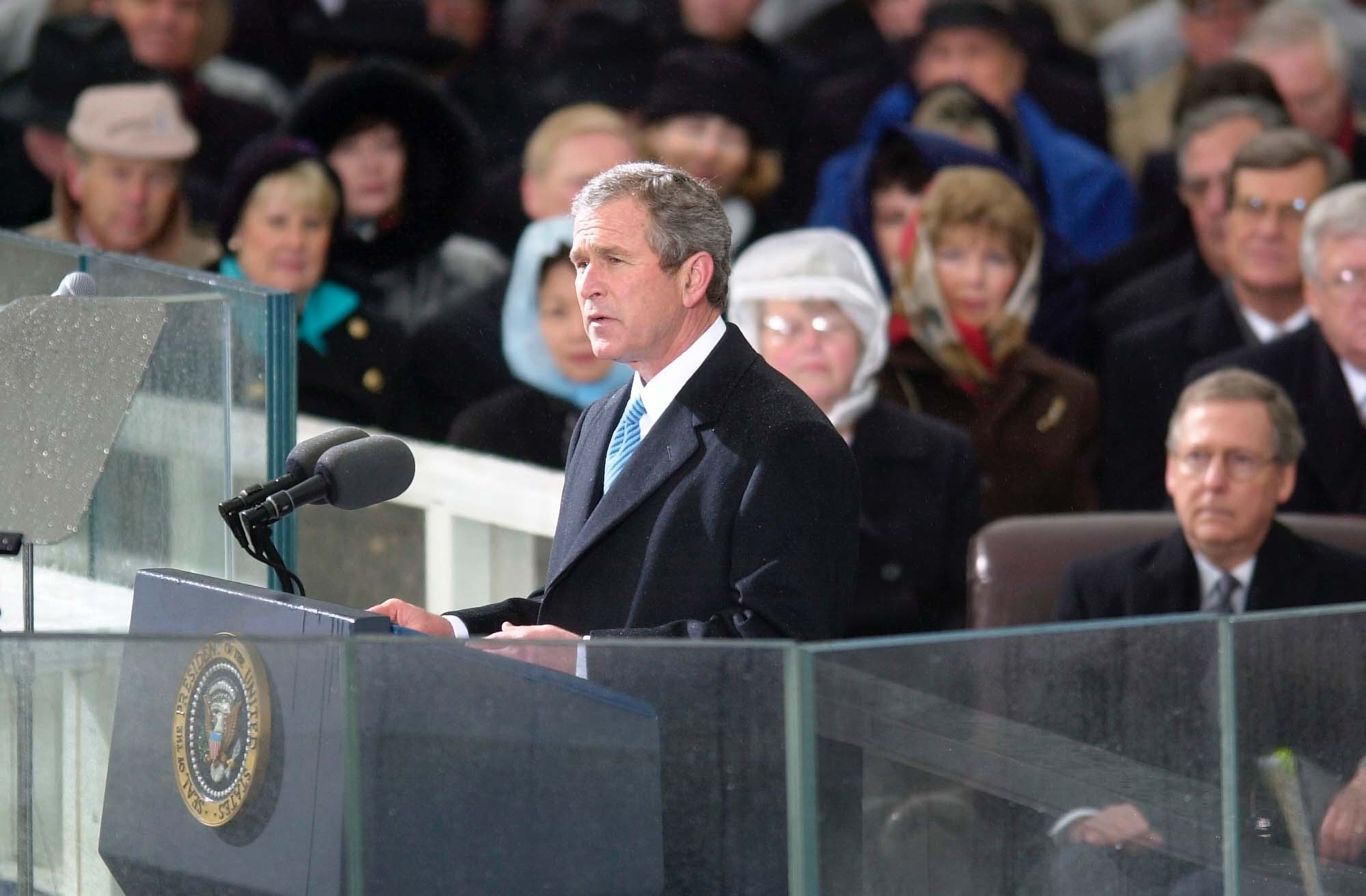
George W. Bush delivers his first inaugural address as president of the United States.

On the eve of the inauguration, there was a celebration for U.S. authors hosted by Laura Bush at DAR Constitution Hall. Live pre-inaugural entertainment was provided by Wayne Newton, Brooks & Dunn, and Ricky Martin.

Thousands of demonstrators attended the inaugural ceremonies in Washington, D.C., to protest the outcome and controversial circumstances of the 2000 presidential election. Four protesters were arrested and Bush's limousine was hit by a tennis ball and an egg thrown from the crowd during the inaugural parade.

== See also ==
- Presidency of George W. Bush
- Presidential transition of George W. Bush
- Second inauguration of George W. Bush
- Timeline of the George W. Bush presidency (2001)
- 2000 United States presidential election
- George W. Bush 2000 presidential campaign
