= George W. Bush 2000 presidential campaign =

American political campaign

George W. Bush for President 2000
- Campaign: 2000 Republican primaries 2000 U.S. presidential election
- Candidate: George W. Bush; 46th Governor of Texas (1995–2000); Dick Cheney; 17th U.S. Secretary of Defense (1989–1993)
- Affiliation: Republican Party
- Status: Announced: June 12, 1999; Presumptive nominee: March 14, 2000; Official nominee: August 3, 2000; Election day: November 7, 2000; Projected victory: December 12, 2000; Certification: January 6, 2001; Inaugurated: January 20, 2001
- Headquarters: Austin, Texas
- Key people: Donald Evans (Campaign chairman); Joe Allbaugh (Campaign manager); Karl Rove (Chief strategist); Karen Hughes (Press secretary); Joshua Bolten (Policy director); Ken Mehlman (National field director); Matthew Dowd (Director of polling and media planning); Dick Cheney (VP Selection Committee Leader)
- Receipts: US$196,844,696.87 (2000-12-31)
- Slogan(s): Reformer with Results; Compassionate conservatism A Fresh Start; Real Plans for Real People

Website
- Bush-Cheney 2000 (archived – October 14, 2000)

The 2000 presidential campaign of George W. Bush, the then-governor of Texas, was formally launched on June 14, 1999, as Governor Bush, the eldest son of former president George H. W. Bush, announced his intention to seek the Republican Party nomination for the presidency of the United States in the 2000 presidential election.

Bush began the campaign as the front runner among Republicans due to his name recognition, high funds, and control of the governorship of Texas and polls starting in 1997 showed Bush leading every opponent by double digits. The main challenger to Bush was Senator John McCain, who appealed to moderate Republicans, independents, and the press due to his reformist policies. After McCain's upset victory in New Hampshire, Bush won the South Carolina primary.

Bush won the majority of the primaries and after the March 2000 Super Tuesday contests he was well ahead in delegates of both McCain and Alan Keyes. On August 3, 2000, Bush won the Republican nomination at the Republican Convention with the support of 2,058 delegates. Dick Cheney, the former U.S. Secretary of Defense, was nominated as vice president despite Cheney initially recommending former Missouri Senator John Danforth.

Throughout the majority of the primary and general campaign seasons Bush was leading Gore in the polls. On November 7, 2000, it was projected that Bush had won in Florida and its 25 electoral votes. Gore won the national popular vote but the Gore campaign lost the electoral college vote after a legal battle over disputed vote counts. Bush won the election on the electoral college vote of 271 to 266.

== Background ==
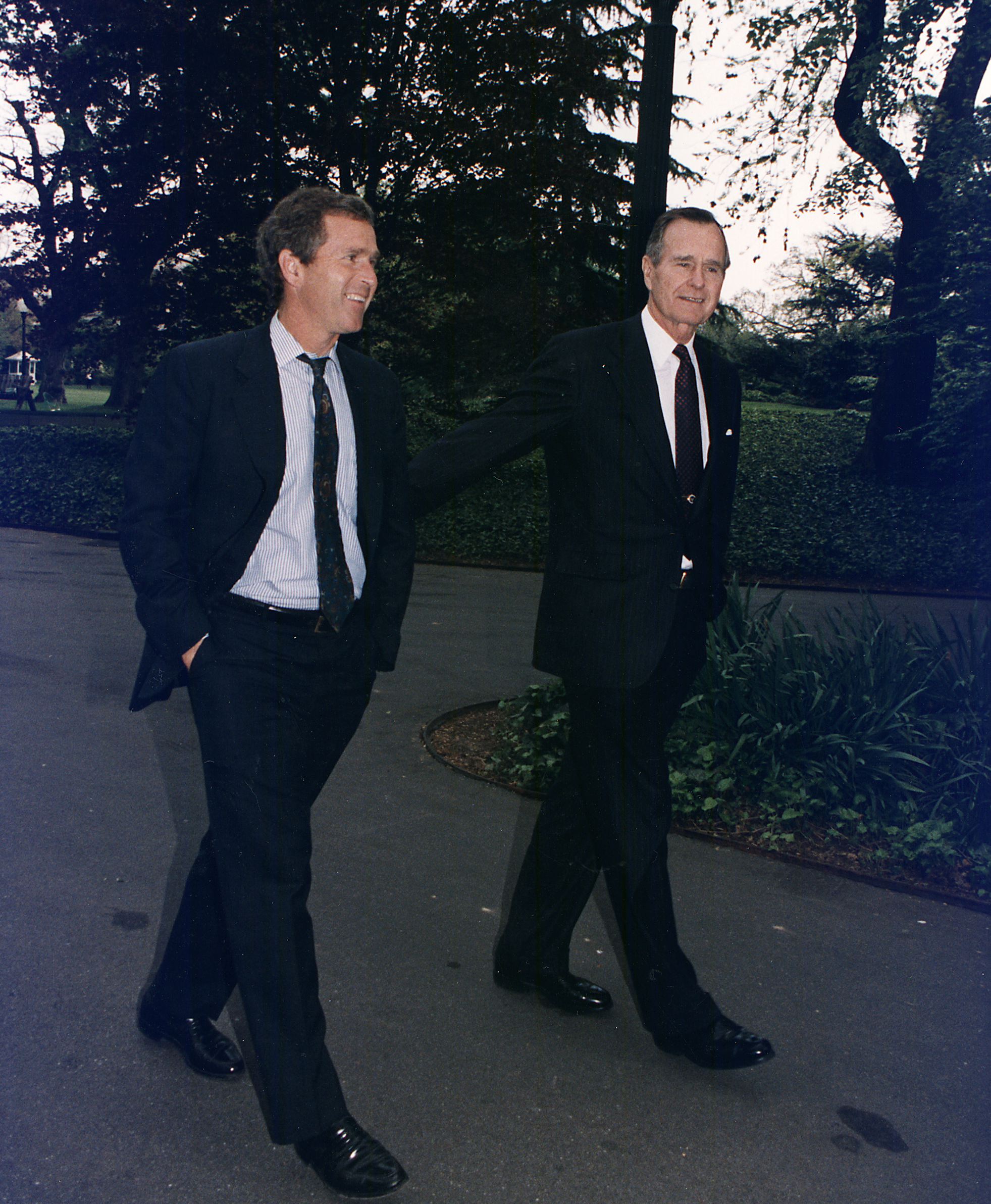
George W. Bush with his father outside the White House, April 29, 1992

In December 1991, Bush was one of seven people named by his father to run his father's 1992 presidential re-election campaign, as a "campaign advisor". Two years following his father's defeat Bush ran for the governorship of Texas in 1994 and defeated incumbent Ann Richards.

During the 1996 election cycle, Bush was urged by some party leaders to seek the Republican nomination, but he instead chose to endorse Senator Bob Dole, who won the nomination but lost the general election against Bill Clinton. Dick Cheney, his future vice president, was also urged to run, but he, too, refused to seek the nomination. Bush would temporarily be made co-chairman of the convention.

In 1998, Bush easily won reelection to the Texas governorship with almost 70% and had the best Latino performance for any Republican gubernatorial nominee, with 49% of the Latino vote.

On February 2, 1999, one month before Bush announced the formation of his presidential exploratory committee, Bush was asked by Steve Cooper if he had "ever used drugs? Marijuana, cocaine?". Bush refused to answer the question and would continue to dodge questions relating to his possible illegal drug use until August.

== Announcement ==
On March 7, 1999, Bush announced the creation of a presidential exploratory committee while surrounded by Governor John Engler, Senator Paul Coverdell, former Secretary of State George Shultz, former Republican National Committee chairman Haley Barbour, Jennifer Dunn, J. C. Watts, Henry Bonilla and Roy Blunt, all members of his newly formed committee, but chose not to disclose specific positions on national issues until he started formally campaigning in June. However, Bush did outline his philosophy of compassionate conservatism and his outreach plans to Hispanics.

Blunt said that eighty Republican House members had already endorsed Bush and the Bush campaign was focused on gaining the endorsement from the majority of Republican members of Congress. On May 26, one hundred fifteen Republican House members and several governors endorsed Bush seventeen days before his formal announcement.

During this time, multiple polls were showing that forty percent of Americans would vote against and another fifteen percent would not likely vote for his eventual opponent, Vice President Al Gore. The polls also showed that Bush would defeat Gore by a margin of 54% to 40%.

== Campaign developments 1999 ==
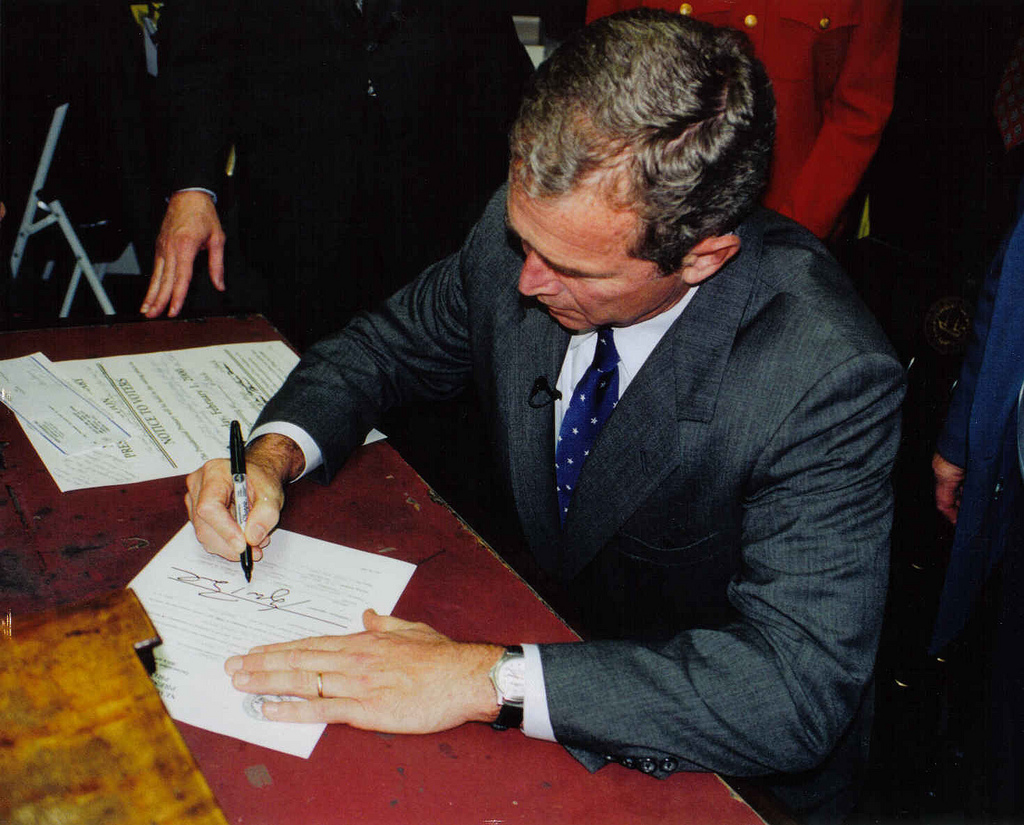
George W. Bush in Concord, New Hampshire, signing to be a presidential candidate

=== June ===
By the time that Bush had officially entered the primary race on June 12, 1999 eight other candidates, Bob Smith, John Kasich, Pat Buchanan, Lamar Alexander, Dan Quayle, Elizabeth Dole, Steve Forbes and Gary Bauer, had already entered with John McCain and Alan Keyes coming months later. Despite this crowded field Bush was able to raise $36.2 million eighteen days after his announcement, easily surpassing his opponents with Elizabeth Dole, who had the second highest donations total, only had $3.5 million, and by early July Bush would refuse $16.5 million in Federal matching funds as it would limit his spending as his donations were reaching the $40 million limit. Coincidentally, this action which Bush did to help his campaign also helped his opponents who were able to receive their matching funds earlier.

=== July ===
Orrin Hatch stated that "Bush doesn't have the experience to be president and was born in privilege," after he announced his own presidential campaign and that he would be there when Bush stumbles. However, by mid-July Bush's campaign fundraising and massive leads in the polls had already forced out two of his opponents, Bob Smith and John Kasich. Kasich would endorse Bush saying that "George Bush's term of 'compassionate conservative' really kind of defines what John Kasich is all about," and Bob Smith hinted at running for the U.S. Taxpayer party

Bush had also already campaigned in twelve states and the District of Columbia. As Bush was forcing out his opposition and campaigning, Senator McCain was campaigning months after his informal announcement in April in South Carolina after his decision to bypass the Iowa caucus.

=== August ===
On August 4 the first major scandal in the Bush campaign started after his refusal to answer whether he had ever used cocaine. Seventeen days later Bush won an Iowa straw poll and held a press conference in Austin, Texas where the question of his drug use was raised, causing him to become agitated. When asked if he thought the rumors were being planted Bush replied with "Do I think they are being planted? I know they are being planted, and they are ridiculous and they're absurd and the people of America are sick and tired of this kind of politics and I am not participating." The next day Bush would say that he had never used drugs since 1974 and that his FBI background check clears him of any possible drug use.

While this scandal was going on, another low-profile scandal popped up involving the firing of Democrat Eliza May as Texas's top funeral industry regulator. The Bush campaign along with multiple other Republican candidates attacked Al Gore due to his ties to Russia.

=== September ===
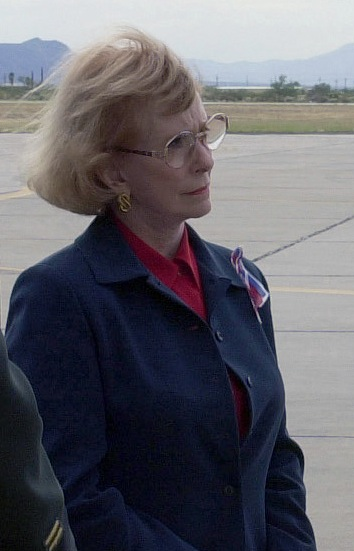
Governor Jane Dee Hull

On September 2 Bush gave his first speech regarding his policy on education stating that his administration would require states to test disadvantaged students and proposed stripping federal funds from the worst-scoring schools and allowing private schools to get public money.

After campaigning in New Hampshire for months polling showed that Bush's numbers had risen eight percent since May from 37% to 45% while John McCain's fell two percent from 14% to 12% and was still behind Elizabeth Dole by three percent. Another poll at the time showed that Bush had increase his polling lead against Gore with 56% going to Bush and 39% going to Gore.

After Larry Gene Ashbrook committed a church shooting at Fort Worth, Texas Bush cut his campaign activities to return to Texas where he stated that "there seems to be a wave of evil passing through America now, and we as a society can pass laws and hold people accountable for the decisions they make, but our hopes and prayers have got to be that there is more love in society," and six days later Bush announced a gun crimes initiative.

On September 23 Bush was campaigning in South Carolina where he promised to renew a bond of trust between president and the military and attacked Bill Clinton for his endless and aimless deployments, which he promised to end.

Five days later Bush received a major endorsement when the Governor of Arizona, Jane Dee Hull, chose to endorse him instead of Arizona's own Senator McCain.

=== October ===
The Bush campaign enjoyed two major successes in the beginning of October where the mayor of New York City, Rudy Giuliani, endorsed Bush and a few days later a Quinnipiac Poll showed that Bush was matching Gore in New York, but was lagging behind Bill Bradley.

Despite his success in one New England state, Bush would refuse to participate in the New Hampshire forum, with his campaign stating that Bush would not participate in any debates before January.

By late October the Bush campaign had released its first television commercial in both Iowa and New Hampshire one week after Al Gore released one attacking the Senate Republicans for rejecting the Comprehensive Nuclear Test Ban Treaty. At the same time on the 20th the Bush campaign had announced that it was leading in the polls in every state primary and caucus.

=== November ===
After enjoying success after success in the previous months Bush was quizzed on his knowledge of foreign affairs on the fourth at WHDH-TV in Boston and he failed it with a score of 25%. Bush was asked to name the leaders of Chechnya, Taiwan, India and Pakistan, Bush was only able to name Lee Teng-hui of Taiwan.

More failures occurred as polls conducted by WNDS-TV and Franklin Pierce College showed that John McCain had risen in the polls with Bush falling from 45% for Bush and 12% for McCain in September to 38% for Bush and 30% for McCain. However, this was lessened when Bush was polling at 52% in Iowa, well ahead of Steve Forbes, who placed second with 13%, and safe from McCain who had decided to skip campaigning for the Iowa Caucus in favor of the New Hampshire Primary.

Despite these setbacks Bush's war chest still made him untouchable by the rest of the Republican field except for multi-millionaire Steve Forbes.

=== December ===
Despite his campaign's previous statement that Bush would not appear in a debate before January, Bush participated in a New Hampshire forum on the second. Most of the Republican candidates attacked Bush except for John McCain who, despite being in a dead heat with Bush in New Hampshire, exchanged pleasantries. After the debate pundit Tucker Carlson said that "Bush cannot afford too many more episodes like this one" and that "if the Bush market does crash, John McCain is almost certain to be the beneficiary". At a debate in Phoenix Bush was considered the loser, helping not his opponents who had participated in the debate, but instead John McCain who had skipped the debate.

During the previous months McCain had been focused on campaigning in New Hampshire while Bush was running a national campaign and by the ninth McCain had overtaken Bush and was leading him by seven points with 37%.

After suffering from numerous failures during this month Bush was still able to receive the endorsement of Lamar Alexander, who had ended his presidential campaign on August 16 after placing sixth place in the Iowa GOP straw poll on August 14. Another high point happened late in the month when Bush added another $10 million to his campaign war chest, reaching $67 million by the end of the year.

== Campaign developments 2000 ==
=== January ===
In early January Orrin Hatch attacked Bush's service as governor of Texas as a "constitutionally weak governorship".

On January 24 Bush won both the Alaska and Iowa caucuses with 36.28% and 41.01% respectively and two days later Hatch ended his campaign and endorsed Bush, saying that I believe Governor Bush is the one who can unite the party and bring the White House back to us, months after his criticism that "Bush doesn't have the experience to be president and was born in privilege".

After this victory many pundits predicted that Bush would easily take the nomination as he had received 40% of the vote in Iowa to McCain's, his main opponent, 5%. However, despite his success in Iowa, some pundits were speculating that Bush could lose the primaries and made reference to the fact that his father had won the Iowa caucus against Ronald Reagan, but had lost the nomination.

=== February ===
As the New Hampshire primary results were reported Bush was very pleased when he won the first precinct counted in Dixville Notch. However, when the primary ended McCain had an eighteen-point lead over Bush and he agreed that Tuesday's results were more of a beginning than an end.

Despite this defeat Bush was still certain that South Carolina was Bush country. As the South Carolinia primary approached McCain overtook Bush in the polls by five points. McCain was focusing his efforts on South Carolina while Bush was divided between Delaware and South Carolina. Another poll taken from the fourth to the fifth in South Carolina showed that McCain had a lead of four points with 44%, up from 32% in January, against Bush's 40%, down from 52% in January.

Bush criticized McCain's campaign strategy stating that "if somebody runs for president of the United States, they need to run in all the states".

On the eighth Bush won the Delaware primary with 50.73%, he hoped that this victory could be used to make him surge in the South Carolina polls which was to happen in eleven days. Two days later Steve Forbes announced that he was ending his campaign, but refused to endorse any of the candidates at that moment.

Shortly before the primary a debate was held where both Bush and McCain attacked each other for negative campaigning, giving a small victory to minor candidate Alan Keyes. Since the New Hampshire primary Bush had been spending millions in South Carolina, with $2.8 million alone being used to buy television ads, and it was working, Bush had risen in the polls to 58% against McCain's 31%.

On the nineteenth Bush won the South Carolinaian primary with 53.39% against McCain's 41.87%, however McCain wasn't defeated yet as his campaign still looked forward to the Michigan primary. On the 22nd McCain defeated Bush in both his home state of Arizona and Michigan with over 50%, allowing him to continue his campaign and gave him confidence while going into the March 7 primaries. Bush tried to salvage a victory from this defeat saying that "among Republicans and independents, there is no question who the winner is in Michigan tonight, and you're looking at him". At the end of the month Bush defeated McCain in three primaries, in Puerto Rico he took 94.21% of the vote, in Virginia he took 52.79% of the vote, in Washington he took a narrow victory with 48.26% of the vote against McCain's 47.98% and in the North Dakota caucus he took 75.72% of the vote.

=== March ===
Following his victory in Virginia TIME political correspondent John Dickerson stated that "This is a big win for Bush, if for no other reason than it helps him psychologically" however Jeff Greenfield stated that neither Bush nor McCain had the momentum to have a landslide victory. At a rally in Georgia, Bush attacked McCain for his claims of Bush's anti-Catholic bigotry stating that "I try not to take things personally in politics, but calling somebody an anti-Catholic bigot is beyond the reach," and that he had "a record of being inclusive in the state of Texas." On March 6 Bush said in a San Francisco Chronicle interview said that he welcomed support from gays and was willing to meet with members of LCR. Previously, during a November Meet the Press interview, Bush said he would probably not meet with them. Later on the 24th Ari Fleischer said that Bush wouldn't meet with the Log Cabin Republicans as they had supported McCain, but would meet with gay Republicans that had supported Bush.

Shortly before Super Tuesday the McCain campaign attacked Bush for a series of negative ads attacking McCain's environmental record with McCain stating "We've got 48 hours and the message is do not let the Bush campaign and their cronies hijack this election with negative ads and $2.5 million in dirty money" at a rally in Buffalo and filed a complaint to the FEC demanding that the ads be halted until a disclaimer was attached. On Super Tuesday Bush won every primary and caucus except in Vermont, Connecticut, Rhode Island and Massachusetts and following his victory stated "I understand politics, this campaign hasn't been any rougher than others I have seen. Now, we have to get ready to win the White House." John Dickinson said that "It's just a matter of time now before he [John McCain] leaves the race" following as it was now mathematically impossible for John McCain to win the nomination, McCain would later suspend his campaign on the 9th. A poll conducted from March 8–9 showed that Gore was leading Bush by two points with 48%, but another poll conducted from March 10–12 showed Bush leading with 49% against Gore's 43%.

=== April ===
The controversy over Elián González was a major issue throughout 2000 that mobilized the sentiments of Cuban voters in Florida. Despite Gore giving his support to a congressional bill that would give the 6-year-old Cuban boy and his Cuban family permanent residency in the United States, it was Bill Clinton's refusal to support the bill that angered Cuban voters with both the president and Gore. At the same time Bush visited the rust belt to describe his proposals to clean up the long-polluted industrial sites with Bush stating that "Brownfields are a great environmental challenge that face this nation,". A poll conducted from March 30 to April 2 showed that despite the recent controversy that Gore was gaining on Bush. Bush was polling at 46 percent of likely voters with Gore behind him by one percent with 45 percent of likely voters. Due to the close national polling between Gore and Bush there was speculation about who Bush should pick as his vice president to guarantee some swing states. Tom Ridge, the governor of Pennsylvania, was put forward as a possible vice presidential candidate due to his high approval rating and the influx of jobs into Pennsylvania.

Bush easily took the Pennsylvania and Wisconsin primaries due to the lack of a major competitors following McCain ending his campaign. Following his primary victories Bush campaigned in California, which despite polling showing that it would go to Gore, spending multiple days in Sacramento alone and stating that "We now have, in the case of the independents and crossovers, 1.2 million voters who voted for our combined Republican presidential candidates that are in play – many of which have not been in the past".

Bush once more flipped on the issue of meeting with the Log Cabin Republicans and stated that he would meet with gay Republicans and in California he attacked Pete Wilson, the former Republican governor, for his harsh stance on immigration and commented that we must be more inclusive. At the same time Gore was campaigning in Florida, but refused to answer any questions relating to Elián González and instead chose to focus on Social Security reform.

A month after McCain had suspended his campaign McCain indicated on CNN's "Late Edition" that he would be meeting with Bush to discuss campaigning for him and the next week both announced that they would be meeting next month. During this time Bush's stance in the polls improved as he increased his lead over Gore from one percent to nine percent at 50 percent to 41 percent due to negative reception over Gore's stance on Elián González. However, in mid-April Bush was named as a defendant in a whistle-blowing lawsuit in which he was accused of impeding an investigation of a company that had given him campaign contributions. While the whistle-blower lawsuit could've jeopardized his campaign Bush was still doing well as by late April he had increased his campaign fundraising from February and March by $1.5 million and had gained $6 million in April. In late April the meeting with McCain was jeopardized after Charles Wyly, the Texas entrepreneur who, with his brother Sam, paid for ads attacking McCain in the GOP primaries, was given a prominent role at a Republican fund-raising gala that Bush headlined Wednesday night in Washington.

=== May ===
Both Bush and Gore had already received enough delegates to win their respective party's nomination, most of their opponents had already dropped out and on May 2 both easily won the Indiana, North Carolina, and Washington, D.C. primaries and caucus and would easily win the Nebraska and West Virginia primaries the following week. As the May 9 meeting with McCain approached speculation rose about the possibility that McCain would endorse Bush and might become his vice president with some of McCain's advisers stating that an endorsement was likely and on May 9 McCain announced that he endorsed Bush. On May 10 Bush unveiled his $7.4 billion health care proposal in which taxpayers would deduct the cost of insurance premiums for long-term care, as well as provide an additional exemption of $2,750 for those who care for an elderly spouse, parent, or relative at home. By mid-May both Bush and Gore scored victories in their primaries and Bush received another prominent endorsement on May 17 from former First Lady Nancy Reagan and met with four-star general Colin Powell which sparked speculation that he could be given a cabinet position.

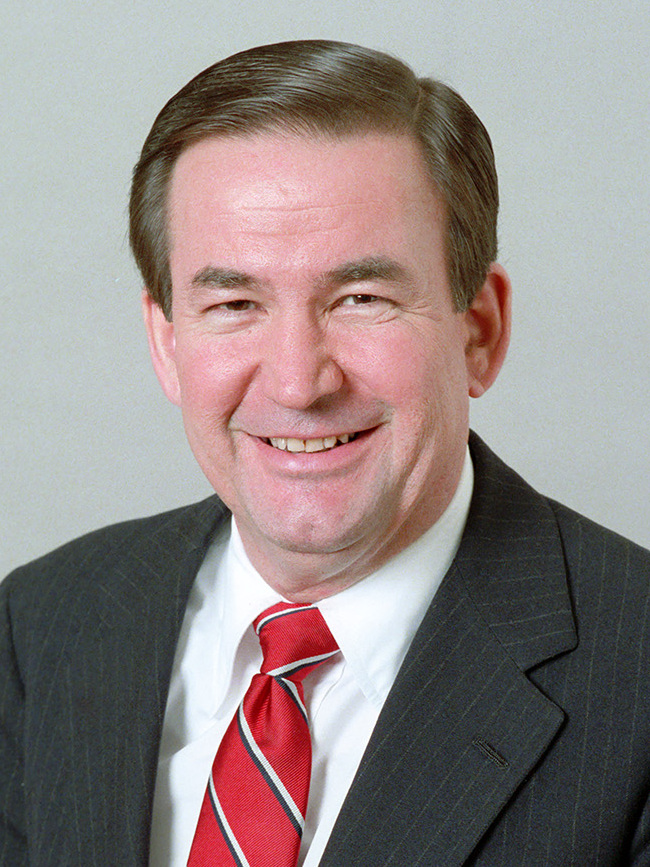
Pat Buchanan
Virginia

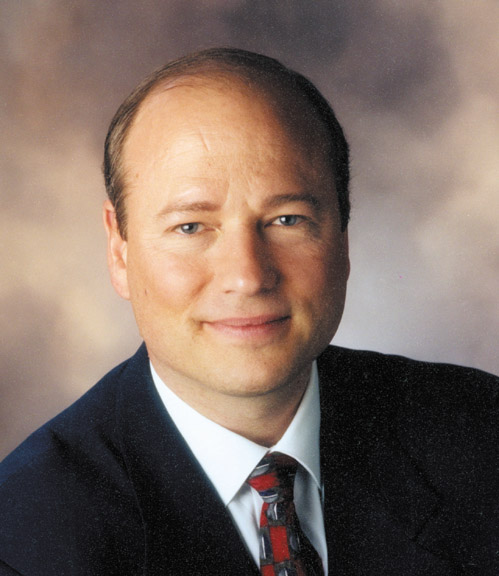
John Hagelin
Iowa

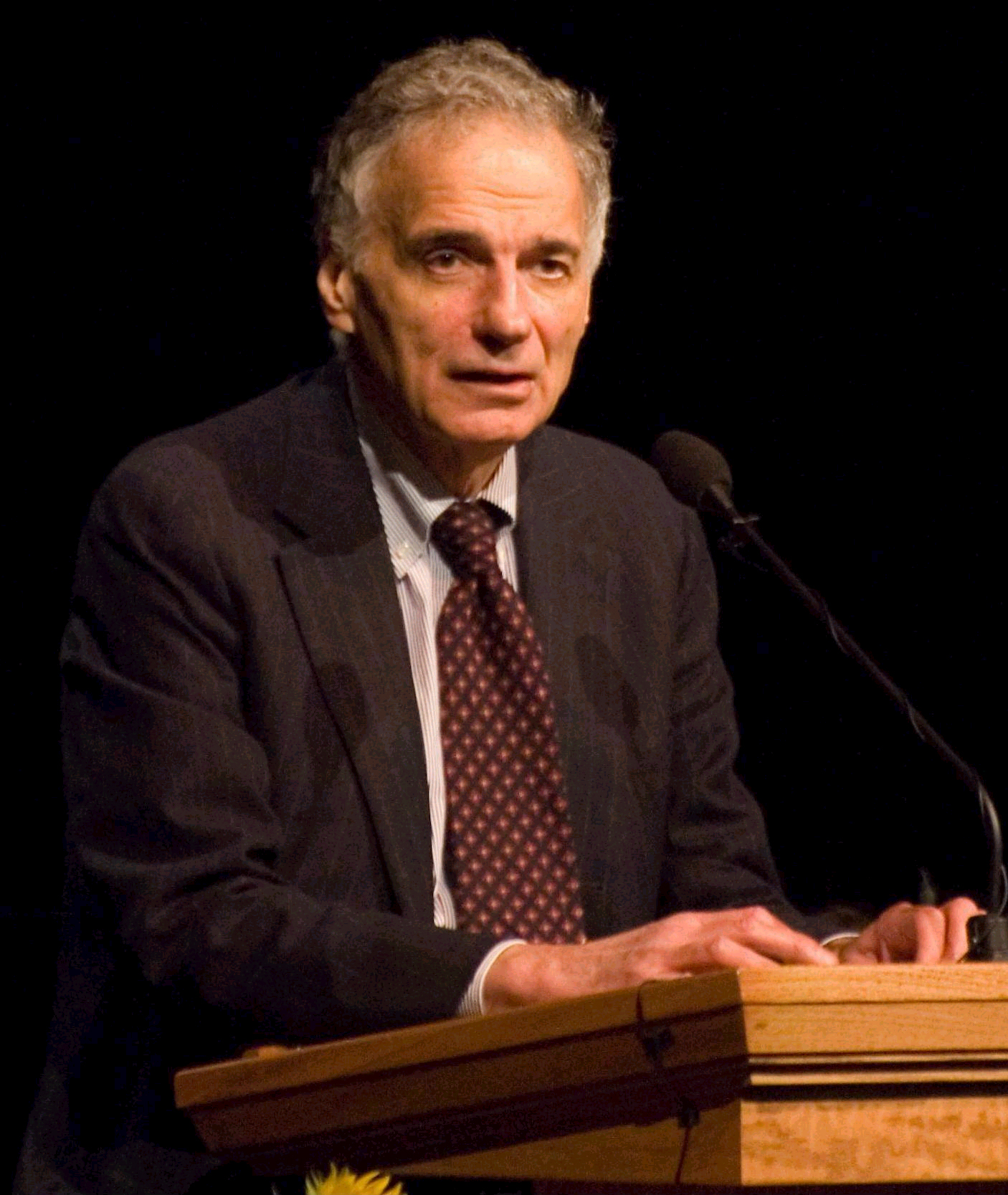
Ralph Nader
Connecticut

During the middle of 2000 the right-wing Reform Party fell into disarray due to legal disputes between presidential candidates Buchanan and Hagelin while the left-wing Green Party candidates Ralph Nader saw an increase in support.

Near the end of May while the Reform Party fell into disarray between Buchanan and Hagelin another third-party candidate was gaining national attention; Ralph Nader of the Green Party was doing well in the polls with him taking over 5% in some and in some important battleground states was taking enough to affect Gore's chances of winning in Oregon, Wisconsin, and New Jersey.

=== June ===
On the subject of the national security Bush once again supported "pursu[ing] the lowest possible [budget] number consistent with our national security," and denuclearization. Despite Bush's success in the past months in both fundraising and polling former president Gerald Ford believed that Bush wouldn't easily win the White House and stated that he "think[s] in this case, who is the vice presidential nominee will make a difference where it's very close," and praised Bush for selecting Dick Cheney, who served as Ford's Chief of Staff, to lead the vice presidential selection committee. Soon after Ford's statement the Democratic National Committee announced a 10-week, $25 million television campaign focused on healthcare to improve Gore's standing in polling. In response the Bush campaign created a 60-second commercial based around Bush's plan to let workers invest some of their Social Security taxes in personal accounts that was to be run in the same 15 states as the Democratic ads.

After a federal court ruled in an anti-trust suit that Microsoft should be separated into two entities speculation arouse over the possibility of billionaire Bill Gates would change both his and his company's campaign contributions due to the court ruling. At the time Microsoft had given $1.1 million in campaign contributions, with $70,000 more given to Republicans, and months earlier in April Gates appeared in a closed-door meeting of the House Republican Conference and stated that the company believed a different administration would likely have treated Microsoft more favorably than did the Clinton-Gore Administration.

A poll conducted from June 14 to the 15th of 1,218 adult Americans, which included 589 likely voters, showed that the public was more likely to view Bush as a strong and decisive leader and that 55 percent would be proud to have him as president opposed to 46 who said the same about Gore. During mid-2000 a new campaign issue arose over how the government should spend the current budget surplus that had been present since 1998 and was the first since 1969; Bush proposed to partially privatize Social Security using the money while Gore offered spending initiatives on health care and education. In late June Bush held more meetings with his vice presidential selection committee and even though he had not narrowed his list down there was speculation that he would pick either Governor Tom Ridge of Pennsylvania or Governor John Engler of Michigan due to recent dinners with both men.

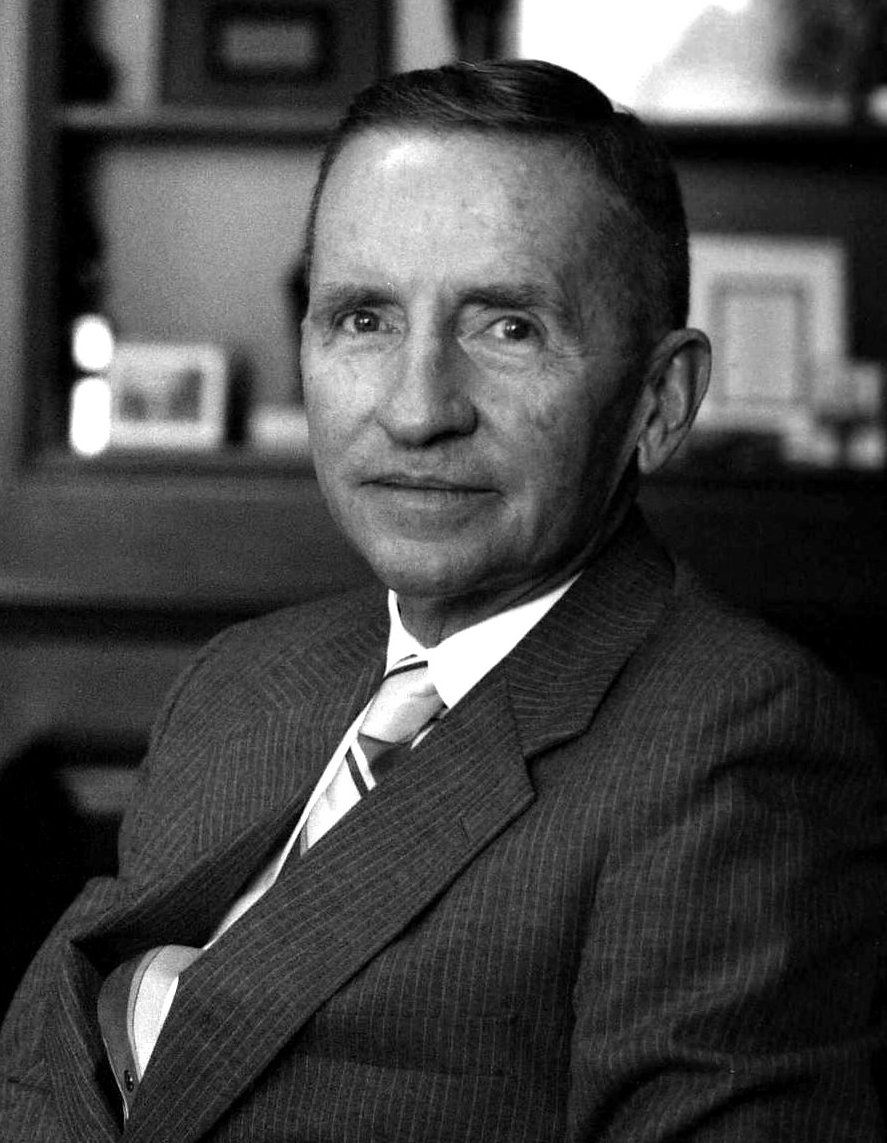
Former presidential candidate Ross Perot who was accused of being a spoiler candidate in the 1992 and 1996 presidential elections.

Near the end of June, Ross Perot, the man whose 1992 campaign had been attacked for spoiling the election in favor of his father's opponent Bill Clinton, announced that he would not run for president under the Reform Party and asked the nominating committee to put the term no endorsement in lieu of his name.

=== July ===
On the Fourth of July Bush was present for a parade attended by 2,000 people in Belton, Texas and Bush continued meeting with Cheney to discuss possible running mates and publicly mentioned Frank Keating, Tom Ridge, John Engler, Connie Mack III, John Kasich, and Christine Todd Whitman. Later Bush attended the NAACP convention in Baltimore, which Bob Dole had refused to do in 1996, and was given a standing ovation by the 3,000 attendees, but polling afterwards showed no impact on Bush's polling with African Americans. A poll conducted in mid-July showed Gore closing the gap between him and Bush with it showing Bush taking 48% and Gore 46% which was an improvement for Gore from a poll released the previous week showing Bush taking 51% and Gore 44% and took the lead over Bush with women voters. Later in July speculation over Bush's running mate choice revolved around Dick Cheney, former Wyoming Representative and Secretary of Defense, and John Danforth, former Senator from Missouri, but both had stated in the past that they were not interested in the vice presidency. On July 25 Bush officially announced that Cheney would be his running mate with him changing his state of residence from Texas to Wyoming to be constitutionally qualified. However, a New York Times article which was published on July 28, 2000 acknowledged that the decision to select Cheney as Bush's Vice Presidential nominee was in fact secretly made "weeks" before it was formally announced. Cheney was soon attacked for his conservative voting record in the House and in a poll conducted from July 26 to the 27th over 60% stated that Bush choosing Cheney had no effect on their vote.

=== August ===
During the convention speculation around who would join a Bush cabinet arose after Bush stated that "I hope [Colin Powell's] greatest service still lies ahead." and after Condoleezza Rice's speech. On August 2 Cheney was approved by acclamation and in his acceptance speech stated that the Clinton administration was marked by "little purpose" and proclaiming that Texas Gov. George W. Bush would "repair what has been damaged." The following day Bush was also approved by acclamation and accepted the nomination and in his acceptance speech attacked the Clinton administration for squandering the past eight years. Later Bush's nephew, George P. Bush gave a bilingual speech about the message of compassionate conservatism. Over the past months Bush had made more appeals to black voters and at the convention multiple African Americans were given the podium, but had only increased his polling among black voters by five percent to fifteen percent for him and the remaining seventy-seven percent for Gore.

Following the Reform primaries a split formed between the Pat Buchanan and John Hagelin factions over who would receive the $12.5 million federal matching funds that the party gained Perot's 1996 campaign and multiple polls showed the Reform party taking far less than they had in 1996 or Perot had in 1992 at less than 1%. By late July the Republican National Committee was coming close to its goal to spend $100 million in support of Bush at $78 million having already been spent, which was double the $35 million spent by the Democratic National Committee. However, despite the large sums being spent by and in favor of the Bush campaign Gore was able to match and overtake Bush in multiple polls following his boost due to the Democratic convention. Due to Gore's rise in the polls the RNC and the Bush campaign each prepared $5 million in advertisements in swing states to match the $30 million the DNC and Gore campaign had spent in the past two months.

=== September ===
Al Gore rejected Bush's offer to debate in three presidential debates, with two being on television shows and one conducted by the Commission on Presidential Debates, and told him that he must first accept the debates proposed by the Commission on Presidential Debates. Bush started September with visits to nine cities in Illinois, Michigan, Pennsylvania, Wisconsin, Indiana and Ohio. After giving a speech in one of the few Republican friendly areas in Chicago controversy arouse due to an open microphone catching Bush and Cheney using swear words to describe Adam Clymer, a New York Times reporter who wrote articles he felt were unfair to him. The New York Times initially was going to ignore the story, but changed its decision after further statements made from the Bush campaign accusing Clymer of bias.

Despite having led Gore during the majority of the race by September more polls were showing Gore narrowly leading Bush nationally and close margins in essential swing states such as Missouri and Florida due to Bush's mishandling of the debates and questions about military readiness and recent controversies. However, multiple polls showed Nader taking 3% in many key battleground Midwestern states that could have decided the election. To counter his decreased polling Bush started to take a more aggressive stance against Gore, reorganized his media interviews, and to improve his military readiness stances. Bush also created another slogan, "Real Plans for Real People", and relented on his debate demands and instead accept the Commission on Presidential Debates' terms. Bob Dole's 1996 campaign manager stated that "I don't think they've handled [the debate issue] very well, but there's time to clear it," with Republican operatives stating that Bush had endangered himself by attempting to restructure the traditional format.

Another controversy was created when Democrats accused Bush of using subliminal messaging in an attack ad against Gore's prescription drug proposal, with opponents accusing him of flashing the word "RATS" on the screen. Later Senators John Breaux and Ron Wyden asked the FCC to review Bush's ad although Bush had stated that there was no subliminal message in the ad.

By mid-September, the Bush and Gore campaigns agreed to three 90-minute debates although the debate moderators and debate formats were initially left undecided. Days later both campaigns agreed to a format of traditional two-podium, table debate, and then a town-hall debate for the three debates.

The Bush campaign was forced to shift resources to the South as the Gore campaign was emboldened by its higher polling enough to target multiple Southern states despite those states having been earlier written off due to their disdain for Gore's environmental stances and lower polling causing the initial Gore strategy to focus on the Northeast, Pacific coast, and Midwestern states.

Near the end of September polling for Bush worsen as Gore passed 50% for the first time after a CNN/USA Today/Gallup poll showed Gore leading Bush 51% to 41%. More polling by CNN/USA Today/Gallup showed Bush tied with Gore at 46%.

=== October ===
At the first presidential debate Bush attacked Gore for his criticism of his $1.3 trillion tax cut proposal and described Gore's attack as "fuzzy math" and also attacked Gore for his involvement in a campaign finance controversy during the 1996 presidential election. Bush's performance at the debate was described as adequate enough, but lead to no significant change in polling and most polls continued showing Gore winning with a narrow lead.

Polling conducted shortly before the second presidential debate showed Gore and Bush tied at 45% and after the second debate Bush's performance was described as adequate again and lead to no serious change in polling although some polls showed him leading Gore by a few percentage points. Bush performed worse at the third presidential debate and Gore was considered the winner.

After the debates John McCain warned that many independent voters might choose to not vote and believed that a large number were still undecided. In the final weeks of the campaign Bush targeted the Midwest and Northeast through increased advertisement spending in Minnesota, campaign rallies in New York, New Hampshire and Ohio, and campaigning with governors in Missouri, Iowa, and Wisconsin.

=== November ===
Early in October polling in California showed Gore leading Bush by a large margin of 14%, but by November that margin had decreased to 7% and with other national polls showing neither candidate with 50% leading to speculation that neither candidate would achieve a majority in the popular vote and would have a close electoral college vote. On November 7 Bush won the popular vote in thirty states and took 271 electoral votes while Gore won both the national popular vote and the popular vote in twenty states and Washington, D.C. and took 267 (Note: Later when the electoral college voted one Washington, D.C. elector chose to abstain.) electoral votes. Neither candidate received over 50% as predicted. However, controversy was created due to close results in multiple states as in New Hampshire, Oregon, New Mexico, Iowa. Wisconsin, and Florida the margin of victory were within 1% and in Florida, New Mexico and Oregon the results were too close to call on election night and would result in a lengthy recount battle.

== Post-election developments 2000 ==
=== November ===
Due to the closeness of the results in multiple states a vast majority of Americans were prepared to accept Bush or Gore as president according to a CNN/USA Today/Gallup poll.

Representative Robert Wexler claimed that over 19,000 in Palm Beach County have been disqualified because of a faulty ballot that would double-punch the ballot which would invalidate it as voting twice.

In New Mexico, Gore initially held a lead of 9,575 votes in unofficial results, however after a partial recount of absentee and early voting ballots his lead shrunk to 162 votes. In Oregon Republicans were setting the ground work for a recount effort while the Bush campaign itself was looking into possible recounts in New Mexico, Iowa, Oregon and Wisconsin. In Florida Gore offered to accept the results of manual recounts in a select number of Florida counties.

=== December ===
As the controversy in Florida heated up the recounts in counties throughout the United States brought it to many other swing states. In New Mexico amended results from Roosevelt County gave Al Gore a 368-vote lead, but as Gore had only won the state with 483 votes there were plans to review 570 disputed ballots in the county that were not counted. At the Supreme Court a new question was brought up over whether the Florida Legislature had the power to appoint electors, but Bush's lawyers urged the high court to hold that "the Constitution specifically assigns the power to determine the manner of appointing presidential electors to the state legislature," as opposed to the "state" in general.

As Florida's Legislature was planning to hold a special session to appoint electors Bush's brother, governor of Florida Jeb Bush, was facing a dilemma over whether to be involved in the case or to allow the bill to pass automatically by not signing it for seven days as the Republican majority legislature would choose a Republican majority electorate to give the state's electoral votes to Bush which would bring up talk of the brothers working together. However, Florida Senate President John McKay announced he would not call a special session to deal with the selection of electors despite other legislators expressed confidence that he would.

During this time Bush and Cheney were starting the transition process, spoke positively of Senator Trent Lott and Speaker Dennis Hastert, created a website, and Cheney hoped that the legal battle over Florida's electors would be over by December 12. The Democratic party launched a campaign to discredit the special legislation session as Florida's legislative rules do not permit the minority party to filibuster to prevent a vote during a special session and statements made by John Ahmann, one of the engineers for ballot devices, made in support of Bush were used in attacks as he acknowledged that a re-inspection or recount of ballots may be required in cases of extremely close elections. The Supreme Court overturned the decision of the Florida Supreme Court that allowed manual vote recounts to proceed after a November 14 ballot-certification deadline set by that state's legislature stating that "after reviewing the opinion of the Florida Supreme Court, we find 'that there is considerable uncertainty as to the precise grounds for the decision,'" and more appeals made by the Gore campaign were rejected by the state court.

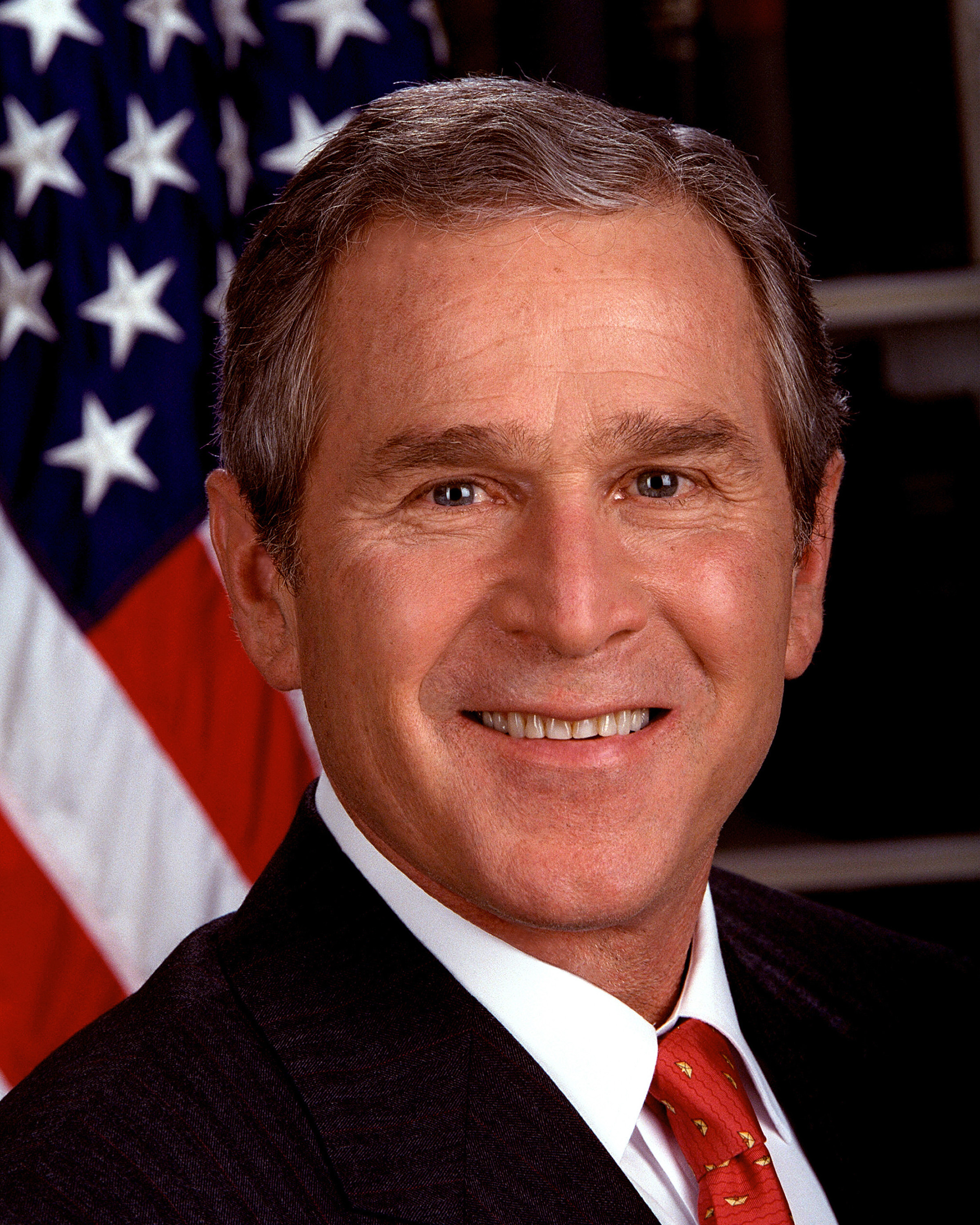
President George W. Bush

In New Mexico the Republicans were planning to send volunteers to inspect the state's impounded presidential ballots to find uncounted ballots. Events in Florida turned against Bush as a Federal Appeals Court ruled that a manual recount did not cause any harm to him or his supporters and a legislative special session was announced to appoint electors.

Later the Supreme Court of Florida ordered a statewide recount, but news in favor of Bush also happened as a Democratic court challenge against the counting of 15,000 absentee votes in Seminole and Leon counties, two counties in which Bush won absentee voters, failed. At the same time the Bush campaign chose to not push for a recount in New Mexico as its five electoral votes would not decide the national race.

The recount was in progress on December 9 when the United States Supreme Court, by a 5 to 4 vote (Justices Stevens, Souter, Ginsburg and Breyer dissenting), granted Bush's emergency plea for a stay of the Florida Supreme Court recount ruling, stopping the incomplete recount. About 10 pm. EST on December 12, the United States Supreme Court handed down its ruling. Seven of the nine justices saw constitutional problems with the Equal Protection Clause of the United States Constitution in the Florida Supreme Court's plan for recounting ballots, citing differing vote-counting standards from county to county and the lack of a single judicial officer to oversee the recount. By a 5–4 vote the justices reversed and remanded the case to the Florida Supreme Court "for further proceedings not inconsistent with this opinion", prior to the optional "safe harbor" deadline which the Florida court had said the state intended to meet. With only two hours remaining until the December 12 deadline, the Supreme Court's order effectively ended the recount.

The decision was extremely controversial due to its partisan split and the majority's unusual instruction that its judgment in Bush v. Gore should not set precedent but should be "limited to the present circumstances". Gore said he disagreed with the Court's decision, but conceded the election. Florida Secretary of State Katherine Harris's certification of the election results was thus upheld, allowing Florida's electoral votes to be cast for Bush, making him president-elect.

On January 20, 2001, George W. Bush was inaugurated as the 43rd president of the United States.

==== Dick Cheney home state ====
Earlier in 2000 Cheney had changed his state of residency from Texas to Wyoming to comply with the 12th Amendment qualification as presidential electors are barred from casting votes for a president and vice president that reside in the same state. However, Cheney's residency was questioned and brought to court by three voters from Texas who argued that as Cheney was still a resident of Texas that the 32 electors would be voided which would throw the presidential election into the House and Senate for the first time since 1824. However, the court ruled that Cheney was a resident of Wyoming and did not void the Texan electors' votes.

== Polling ==
=== Primary ===
Poll source	Sample size	Date(s)	Bush	Dole	McCain	Forbes	Buchanan	Keyes	Quayle	Bauer	Hatch	Others
CNN	377 Republican New Hampshire Primary Voters	N/A	45%'	15%	12%	10%	5%	4%	3%	1%	1%	4%

=== General ===
Poll source	Sample size	Date(s)	Margin of Error	Bush	Gore	Buchanan	Nader	Others
CNN	1,698 Adults	September 10–14, 1999	± 2.5%	56%'	39%	-	-	-
CNN	998 Adults and 498 Likely Voters	March 30 – April 2, 2000	± 5%	46%'	45%	-	-	-
CNN	1,006 Adults and 502 Likely Voters	April 7–9, 2000	± 5%	48%'	42%	4%	-	-
CNN/USA Today/Gallup Poll	515 likely voters	May 23–24, 2000	N/A	49%'	47%	-	-	4%
CNN/USA Today/Gallup Poll	1,259 respondents	September 4–6, 2000	±4% pts	44%	47%'	>1%	3%	-
CNN/USA Today/Gallup Poll	657 likely voters	September 18–20, 2000	±4% pts	41%	51%'	1%	3%	-
CNN/USA Today/Gallup Poll	640 likely voters	September 25–27, 2000	N/A	46%'	46%'	1%	3%	-

== Results ==
=== Primary campaign results ===
2000 U.S. President Republican primaries popular vote
Party	Candidate	Votes	%
Republican	George W. Bush	12,034,676	62.00
Republican	John McCain	6,061,332	31.23
Republican	Alan Keyes	985,819	5.08
Republican	Steve Forbes	171,860	0.89
Republican	Unpledged	61,246	0.32
Republican	Gary Bauer	60,709	0.31
Republican	Others	19,701	0.10
Republican	Orrin Hatch	15,958	0.08
Total votes		19,411,301	100.00

=== General election results ===
Total popular votes in United States presidential election, 2000:

Electoral results
Presidential candidate	Party	Home state	Popular vote		Electoral vote	Running mate		
Presidential candidate	Party	Home state	Count	Percentage	Electoral vote	Vice-presidential candidate	Home state	Electoral vote
George W. Bush	Republican	Texas	50,456,002	47.86%	271	Dick Cheney	Wyoming	271
Al Gore	Democratic	Tennessee	50,999,897	48.38%	266	Joe Lieberman	Connecticut	266
Ralph Nader	Green	Connecticut	2,882,955	2.74%	0	Winona LaDuke	Minnesota	0
Pat Buchanan	Reform	Virginia	448,895	0.43%	0	Ezola Foster	California	0
Harry Browne	Libertarian	Tennessee	384,431	0.36%	0	Art Olivier	California	0
Howard Phillips	Constitution	Virginia	98,020	0.09%	0	Curtis Frazier	Missouri	0
John Hagelin	Natural Law	Iowa	83,714	0.08%	0	Nat Goldhaber	California	0
Other			51,186	0.05%	—	Other		—
(Undervote) (Note: One faithless elector from Washington, D.C., Barbara Lett-Simmons, cast a blank ballot in protest of the District's lack of voting representation in the United States Congress. Washington, D.C. has a non-voting delegate to Congress. She had been expected to vote for Gore/Lieberman.)	—	—	[data missing]	—	1	(Undervote)	—	1
Total			105,421,423	100%	538			538
Needed to win					270			270

== Campaign finance ==
Candidate	Campaign committee							
Candidate	Raised	Total contrib.	Ind. contrib.	Pres. pub. funds	Spent	COH	Owed By	Owed To
George W. Bush	$196,844,696.87	$104,050,089.67	$101,789,902.58	$67,560,000.00	$192,996,128.06	$3,849,567.07	$0	$1,085,182.10

State/Territory	Campaign Fundraising and Spending By State/Territory	
State/Territory	Ind. contrib.	Spent
Alabama	$1,157,774.00	$43,375.00
Alaska	$175,199.00	$4,700.00
Arizona	$944,486.00	$18,975.00
Arkansas	$615,268.00	$12,785.00
California	$9,429,946.00	$240,240.00
Colorado	$1,094,609.00	$35,508.00
Connecticut	$2,019,101.00	$35,508.00
Delaware	$385,584.00	$5,500.00
Florida	$5,947,102.00	$305,524.00
Foreign electoral intervention	$174,000.00	$0.00
Georgia (U.S. state)	$2,272,616.00	$83,794.00
Guam	$2,250.00	$0.00
Hawaii	$77,127.00	$3,835.00
Idaho	$167,030.00	$4,300.00
Illinois	$2,216,910.00	$57,250.00
Indiana	$951,558.00	$10,625.00
Iowa	$318,478.00	$6,875.00
Kansas	$446,050.00	$8,325.00
Kentucky	$909,646.00	$17,665.00
Louisiana	$955,121.00	$252,208.00
Maine	$191,859.00	$650.00
Maryland	$1,843,906.00	$34,410.00
Massachusetts	$1,853,898.00	$24,050.00
Michigan	$2,982,091.00	$63,145.00
Minnesota	$700,550.00	$10,225
Mississippi	$560,140.00	$20,014
Missouri	$1,299,874.00	$22,805
Montana	$84,950.00	$3,000
Nebraska	$84,950.00	$8,981
Nevada	$605,572.00	$27,175
New Hampshire	$250,344.00	$3,225
New Jersey	$2,326,470.00	$68,800
New Mexico	$379,585.00	$14,900
New York (state)	$5,065,576.00	$173,819
North Carolina	$1,398,910.00	$32,750
North Dakota	$125,335.00	$2,000
Ohio	$2,300,271.00	$47,560
Oklahoma	$747,542.00	$10,550
Oregon	$520,990.00	$7,849
Other {{{last}}}	$331,758.00	$0.00
Washington (state)	$920,581.00	$14,800.00
Washington, D.C.	$1,173,283.00	$27,486.00
West Virginia	$277,363.00	$0.00
Wisconsin	$663,187.00	$10,300.00
Wyoming	$132,050.00	$2,875.00

== Platform ==
Bush's original platform, before the September 11, 2001 Terrorist Attacks and the war on terrorism:

- Compassionate Conservatism: The Bush campaign made extensive use of the "Compassionate conservatism" concept, based in large part on a book by Marvin Olasky of the same name, with a foreword by then-governor Bush.

Income Group (thousands of dollars)	Average Savings (dollars)
0–10	5
10–20	63
20–30	204
30–40	351
40–50	500
50–75	820
75–100	1,776
100–200	2,710
200–500	5,527
500–1,000	17,605
1,000+	88,873

- Foreign Affairs: Bush promised a humble foreign policy with no nation building. He had criticized the Clinton-Gore Administration for being too interventionist: "If we don't stop extending our troops all around the world in nation-building missions, then we're going to have a serious problem coming down the road. And I'm going to prevent that."
- Economy: Bush promised tax breaks for all, sometimes using the slogan "Whoever pays taxes gets a tax break." The rich pay the most taxes, and the current system weighs the income tax against the upper income brackets. Bush also supported raising the Earned Income Tax Credit, which would primarily benefit the lower brackets of income-tax-affected citizens.

His 2003 tax proposal offers a sweeping package of tax cuts and incentives that would eliminate all federal taxes on stock dividends, quick tax relief for married couples and a $400 per child increase in the tax credit for families with children. Economists are divided on the effectiveness of Bush's proposals for helping the economy. John Leonard, the chief of North American equities for UBS Global Asset Management, said eliminating the dividends tax would spur the economy by sending more money into the economy; on the other hand, other economists, including Allen Sinai of Decision Economics and Andrew F. Brimmer, a former Federal Reserve Board member who heads a consulting firm, argued that the dividends tax cut would be largely ineffective. The administration's proposal would also lower taxes for small business owners by expanding the amount of equipment spending they can write off as deductions from the current $25,000 to $75,000. Opponents argue that this tax proposal would primarily benefit the rich. According to a New York Times analysis published on January 21, 2003, $364 billion out of the $674 billion "economic stimulus" plan is devoted towards eliminating the tax on dividends; however, the poorest fifth of Americans have an average of $25 in dividend income, while the richest fifth have $1,188. The Urban Institute-Brookings Institution Tax Policy Center produced the following table describing the impact of Bush's plan on average taxpayers:

Debate : Will Bush's stimulus proposal work? – News Hour with Jim Lehrer (PBS)

- Education: policy named No Child Left Behind, includes mandatory national testing and some support for school vouchers.

The No Child Left Behind Act provides increased funding for schools, while requiring greater accountability for results. It gives parents the option to transfer their children to another school, if the current school is failing. It requires teachers to have a degree specific to the subject they are teaching, which had not been federally required in the past. It also makes high school academic records available to military recruiters.

- Energy: The Bush campaign supported a comprehensive energy reform bill which included initiatives for energy conserving technologies as well as decreasing the foreign dependence on oil through increased domestic production and the use of non-fossil fuel based energy production methods.

Drilling in the Arctic National Wildlife Refuge (ANWR) and other domestic fields would decrease dependence on oil imports, particularly from the Middle East. However, many environmentalists hold that it will produce such small amounts of petroleum as to be effectively useless and will needlessly harm the environment.

Opponents of such drilling recommended alternate courses of action such as to complete research on and implement as a matter of urgency alternative, safe and renewable sources of energy such as solar, wind and tidal power – but not nuclear. Although perhaps requiring greater initial investment, in the long run these are now accepted by many informed environmentalists and scientists as being the most viable alternative to what they see as the vigorously anti-environmental approaches of the Bush administration.

Supporters of drilling in ANWR argued that the Administration has agreed to a number of measures to minimize the impact of drilling on the Arctic environment. For example, roadways would be constructed of ice that would melt in the spring, when activity on the roads would cease. Also, supporters say that the total surface disturbance due to drilling would be limited to not more than 2,000 acres (8 km²).

Because of the Bush Administration's close connections with numerous energy companies, many of Bush's Cabinet members came under immense scrutiny from environmental groups, in particular J. Steven Griles, the deputy secretary of the Department of the Interior. National Environmental Strategies (NES), the oil and gas lobbying firm which Griles worked for, was paying him $284,000 a year as part of a $1.1 million payout for his client base. As deputy secretary of the Interior, Griles was charged with overseeing and revamping environmental regulations that affect the profits of his former clients and NES's current clients.

- Redesign of military with emphasis on supermodern hardware, flexible tactics, speed, less international deployment, fewer troops. This includes developing a system to defend against ballistic missile attacks, despite strong objections both domestically and internationally. Many commentators were critical of Bush when, in his very first policy statement after the September 11, 2001, terrorist attacks, Bush reiterated his intent to place missile attack intervention highest on his list of priorities (despite the fact that no such system could have prevented the type of sneak attack the country had really, not theoretically, experienced). However, other commentators have endorsed Bush's position, noting, for example, the continuing development of long-range missile technology by North Korea, along with that country's threats to resume its nuclear weapons program.

== Endorsements ==
List of political endorsements

Organizations

- National Right to Life Committee, largest national pro-life organization

U.S. Federal Government

- George H. W. Bush, former President of the United States (1989–1993) and former Vice President of the United States (1981–1989) (candidate's father)
- Dan Quayle, former Vice President of the United States (1989–1993)
- George Shultz, 60th United States Secretary of State (1982–1989)
- Elizabeth Dole, 20th United States Secretary of Labor (1989–1990), 8th United States Secretary of Transportation (1983–1987), and wife of Bob Dole
- Lamar Alexander, 5th United States Secretary of Education (1991–1993) and 45th Governor of Tennessee (1979–1987)
- John H. Sununu, 14th White House Chief of Staff (1989–1991) and 75th Governor of New Hampshire (1983–1989)
- Jack Kemp, 9th United States Secretary of Housing and Urban Development and 1996 Republican vice-presidential nominee
- Thomas Hinman Moorer, Chairman of the Joint Chiefs of Staff (1970–1974)

U.S. Congress

- Orrin Hatch, Senator from Utah (1977–2019)
- Strom Thurmond, Senator from South Carolina (1954–2003)
- John McCain, Senator from Arizona (1987–2018)
- Lincoln Chafee, Senator from Rhode Island (1999–2007)
- Rick Santorum, Senator from Pennsylvania (1995–2007)
- Jennifer Dunn, Representative from Washington's 8th congressional district (1993–2005)
- Julius Caesar Watts Jr., Representative from Oklahoma's 4th congressional district (1995–2003)
- Henry Bonilla, Representative from Texas's 23rd congressional district (1993–2007)
- Roy Blunt, Representative from Missouri's 7th congressional district (1997–2011)
- John Kasich, Representative from Ohio's 12th congressional district (1983–2001)
- Fred Upton, Representative from Michigan's 6th congressional district (1993–2023)
- Pat Toomey, Representative from Pennsylvania's 15th congressional district (1999–2005)

U.S. state officials

- George Pataki, 53rd Governor of New York (1995–2006)
- Jane Dee Hull, 20th Governor of Arizona (1997–2003)
- Tommy Thompson, 42nd Governor of Wisconsin (1987–2001)
- John Engler, 46th Governor of Michigan (1991–2003)
- Marc Racicot, 21st Governor of Montana (1993–2001)
- Paul Cellucci, 69th Governor of Massachusetts (1997–2001)
- Tom Ridge, 43rd Governor of Pennsylvania (1995-2001)
- Robert Jubelirer, President pro tempore of the Pennsylvania Senate (1985–1992;1994–2006)

U.S. municipal officials

- Rudy Giuliani, 107th Mayor of New York City (1994–2001)

Notable individuals

- Ross Perot, former presidential candidate in 1992 and 1996 and founder of the Reform Party
- Steve Forbes, Editor-in-Chief of Forbes and presidential candidate in 1996 and 2000
- Van Cliburn, pianist
- Chuck Norris, actor
- Loretta Lynn, country music singer-songwriter
- Pat Boone, singer and actor
- Michael Retzer, chairman of the Mississippi Republican Party (1978–1982;1996–2001)
- Christine Toretti, Member of the Republican National Committee from Pennsylvania (1997–present)
- Robert B. Asher, Member of the Republican National Committee from Pennsylvania (1998–present)
- Alan Novak, chairman of the Republican State Committee of Pennsylvania (1996–2004)

Newspapers

- Rocky Mountain News, daily newspaper published in Denver, Colorado
- Orlando Sentinel, primary newspaper of Orlando, Florida
- The Providence Journal, daily newspaper serving the metropolitan area of Providence, Rhode Island
- Chicago Tribune, daily newspaper based in Chicago, Illinois
- Chicago Sun-Times, daily newspaper based in Chicago, Illinois
- The Detroit News, newspaper based in Detroit, Michigan
- The Dallas Morning News, daily newspaper serving the Dallas–Fort Worth metroplex
- The Columbus Dispatch, daily newspaper based in Columbus, Ohio
- The Seattle Times, daily newspaper based in Seattle, Washington
- The Plain Dealer, daily newspaper based in Cleveland, Ohio
- The Oregonian, daily newspaper based in Portland, Oregon
- Wisconsin State Journal, daily newspaper in Madison, Wisconsin

== See also ==
- 2000 Republican Party presidential primaries
- 2000 Republican Party vice presidential candidate selection
- 2000 Republican National Convention
- 2000 United States presidential election
- Presidential transition of George W. Bush
- First inauguration of George W. Bush
- Al Gore 2000 presidential campaign
- George W. Bush 2004 presidential campaign
