= 2000 Connecticut Democratic presidential primary =

- March 7, 2000

67 delegates to the Democratic National Convention (54 pledged, 13 unpledged) The number of pledged delegates received is determined by the popular vote

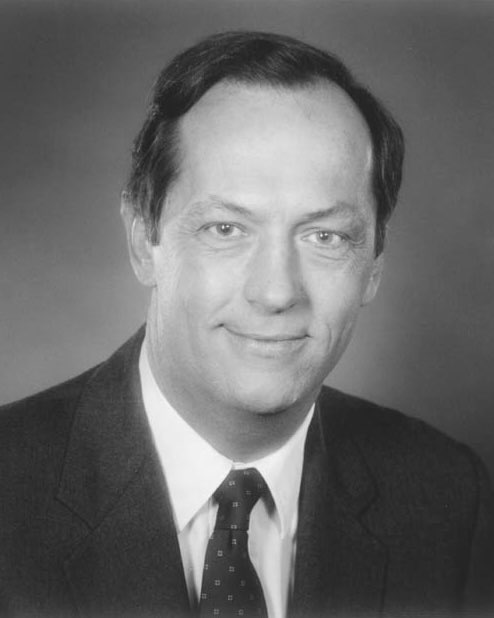
Candidate	Al Gore	Bill Bradley
Home state	Tennessee	New Jersey
Delegate count	30	24
Popular vote	99,563	74,075
Percentage	55.60%	41.37%
- Gore: 40–50% 50–60% 60–70% 70–80% Bradley: 40–50% 50–60% 60–70% Tie

The 2000 Connecticut Democratic presidential primary took place on March 7, 2000, as one of 15 states and one territory holding primaries on the same day, known as Super Tuesday for the Democratic Party presidential primaries for the 2000 presidential election. The Connecticut primary is a closed primary, with the state awarding 67 delegates, of which 54 are pledged delegates allocated on the basis of the results of the primary.

Vice president Al Gore won the primary with 55% of the vote, winning 30 delegates, while senator Bill Bradley caught a relevant amount of delegates one of the last times in the primary cycle, receiving 41% and 24 delegates, while the Uncommitted ballot option took the remaining 3% of the vote. Lyndon LaRouche, Jr. was again not on the ballot in this contest, making it one of the few contests during the primaries that he did not have ballot access, and made Connecticut the only other Super Tuesday contest that LaRouche did not make the ballot for, the other being Georgia.

== Procedure ==
Connecticut was one of 15 states and one territory holding primaries on March 7, 2000, also known as "Super Tuesday".

Voting was expected to take place throughout the state from 6:00 a.m. until 8:00 p.m. In the closed primary, candidates must meet a threshold of 15% at the congressional district or statewide level in order to be considered viable. The 54 pledged delegates to the 2000 Democratic National Convention will be allocated proportionally on the basis of the results of the primary. Of the 54 pledged delegates, between 5 and 7 are allocated to each of the state's 5 congressional districts, and another 12 are allocated to party leaders and elected officials (PLEO delegates), in addition to 7 at-large pledged delegates.

The state party committee met to vote on the 7 pledged at-large and 12 PLEO delegates to send to the Democratic National Convention. The 54 pledged delegates Connecticut sends to the national convention were to be joined by 12 unpledged PLEO delegates: 6 members of the Democratic National Committee, 6 members of Congress (both Senators, Chris Dodd and Joe Lieberman, and 4 Representatives, John Larson, Sam Gejdenson, Rosa DeLauro, and Jim Maloney), 1 distinguished party leader, and 1 add-on.

== Candidates ==
The following candidates appeared on the ballot:

- Al Gore
- Bill Bradley

There was also an uncommitted option.

== Polling ==
Poll source	Date(s)	Sample size	Margin of error	Al Gore (D)	Bill Bradley (D)	Other / undecided (Note: Calculated by taking the difference of 100% and all other candidates combined.)
SurveyUSA	March 4, 2000	493	—	51%	30%	19%
	February 1, 2000	Gore wins the New Hampshire primary				
	January 24, 2000	Gore wins the Iowa caucuses				

== Results ==
2000 Connecticut Democratic presidential primary
Candidate	Votes	%	Delegates
Al Gore	99,563	55.60	30
Bill Bradley	74,075	41.37	24
Uncommitted	5,418	3.03	
Unallocated	-	-	13
Total	177,301	100%	67
