= 2000 Maine Democratic presidential primary =

- March 7, 2000

33 delegates to the Democratic National Convention (23 pledged, 10 unpledged) The number of pledged delegates received is determined by the popular vote

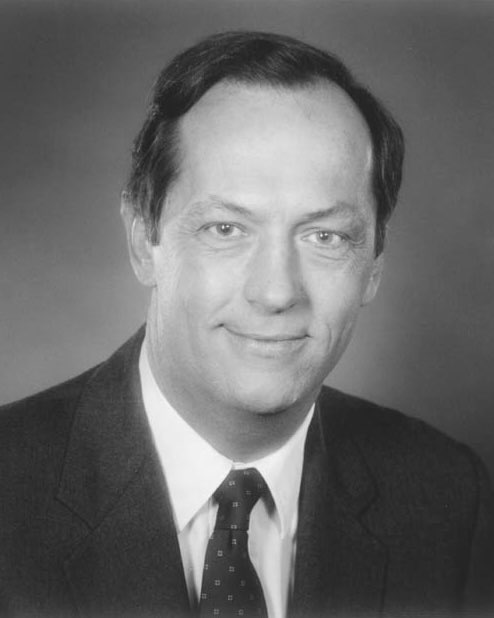
Candidate	Al Gore	Bill Bradley
Home state	Tennessee	New Jersey
Delegate count	13	10
Popular vote	34,725	26,520
Percentage	54.02%	41.26%
- County results Gore: 40–50% 50–60% 60–70% Bradley: 40–50% 50–60%

The 2000 Maine Democratic presidential primary took place on March 7, 2000, as one of 16 contests scheduled on Super Tuesday in the Democratic Party primaries for the 2000 presidential election, following the Washington primary the week before. The Maine primary, the last in the state until the 2020, was a closed primary, meaning that only registered Democrats could vote in this primary. The state awarded 33 delegates towards the 2000 Democratic National Convention, 23 of which were pledged delegates allocated based on the results of the primary.

Vice president Al Gore won the primary with 54% of the vote while Senator Bradley finished second with a result of 41%. Gore gained three more delegates than Bradley statewide, resulting in his win of 13 delegates over Bradley's 10 delegates. Lyndon LaRouche Jr. finished 4th with 0.32% of the vote.

== Procedure ==
Maine was one of 15 states and one territory holding primaries on March 7, 2000, also known as "Super Tuesday".

Voting was expected to take place throughout the state from 6:00 a.m. until 8:00 p.m. In the closed primary, candidates had to meet a threshold of 15 percent at the congressional district or statewide level in order to be considered viable. The 23 pledged delegates to the 2000 Democratic National Convention were allocated proportionally on the basis of the results of the primary. Of these, 7 and 8 were allocated to each of the state's 2 congressional districts and another 3 were allocated to party leaders and elected officials (PLEO delegates), in addition to 5 at-large delegates.

The state convention would subsequently be held to vote on all pledged delegates for the Democratic National Convention. The delegation also included 8 unpledged PLEO delegates: 5 members of the Democratic National Committee, 2 members of Congress, of which both were representatives, Tom Allen and John Baldacci, 2 distinguished party leaders, and 1 add-on.

Pledged national convention delegates
Type	Del.
CD1	8
CD2	7
PLEO	3
At-large	5
Total pledged delegates	23

== Candidates ==
The following candidates appeared on the ballot:

- Al Gore
- Bill Bradley
- Lyndon LaRouche Jr.
- Richard J. Epstein

There was also an uncommitted option.

== Polling ==
Poll source	Date(s)	Sample size	Margin of error	Al Gore (D)	Bill Bradley (D)	Other / undecided (Note: Calculated by taking the difference of 100% and all other candidates combined.)
Research 2000	February 28, 2000	600 (RV) (Note: Sample size unavailable; 600 is a default estimate used in the source dataset.)	—	49%	30%	21%
	February 1, 2000	Gore wins the New Hampshire primary				
	January 24, 2000	Gore wins the Iowa caucuses				

== Results ==
2000 Maine Democratic presidential primary
Candidate	Votes	%	Delegates
Al Gore	34,725	54.02	13
Bill Bradley	26,520	41.26	10
Uncommitted	2,634	4.10	
Lyndon LaRouche Jr.	208	0.32	
Richard J. Epstein	192	0.30	
Unallocated	-	-	10
Total	64,279	100%	33
