= 2000 California Democratic presidential primary =

- March 7, 2000

433 delegates to the Democratic National Convention (367 pledged, 66 unpledged) The number of pledged delegates received is determined by the popular vote

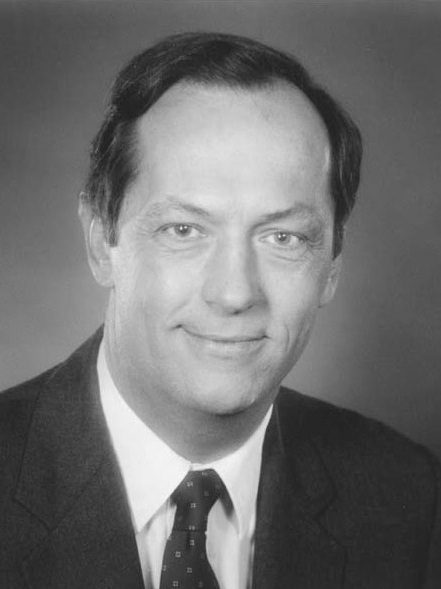
Candidate	Al Gore	Bill Bradley
Home state	Tennessee	New Jersey
Delegate count	305	62
Popular vote	2,155,321	482,882
Percentage	81.21%	18.19%
- Gore: 60–70% 70–80% 80–90%

The 2000 California Democratic presidential primary took place on March 7, 2000, as one of 16 contests scheduled on Super Tuesday in the Democratic Party primaries for the 2000 presidential election, following the Washington primary the weekend before. It was an open primary, with the state awarding 433 delegates towards the 2000 Democratic National Convention, of which 367 were pledged delegates allocated on the basis of the results of the primary.

Vice president Al Gore won the highly desired primary, which bore the most delegates of the entire primary cycle by far, with a commanding 81% and 305 delegates. However, Senator Bill Bradley had a poor second-place finish than expected and took 18% of the vote and 62 delegates. Lyndon LaRouche, Jr. was also on the ballot but received slightly over 0.50% of the vote

== Procedure ==
California was one of 15 states and one territory holding primaries on March 7, 2000, also known as "Super Tuesday".

Voting took place throughout the state from 7 a.m. until 8 p.m. In the semi-closed primary, candidates had to meet a threshold of 15 percent at the congressional district or statewide level in order to be considered viable. The 367 pledged delegates to the 2000 Democratic National Convention were allocated proportionally on the basis of the results of the primary. Of these, between 4 and 6 were allocated to each of the state's 52 congressional districts, and another 48 were allocated to party leaders and elected officials (PLEO delegates), in addition to 80 at-large delegates.

The national convention delegation meeting was subsequently held to vote on the 48 pledged PLEO and 80 at-large delegates for the Democratic National Convention. The delegation also included 61 unpledged PLEO delegates: 31 members of the Democratic National Committee, 29 members of Congress (Note: On July 26, 2000, Congressman Matthew G. Martínez switched his affiliation from Democratic to Republican. This means that Congressman Martinez will not attend the convention as an unpledged PLEO delegate.) (both senators, Dianne Feinstein and Barbara Boxer, and 28 representatives, Mike Thompson, Bob Matsui, Lynn Woolsey, George Miller, Nancy Pelosi, Barbara Lee, Ellen Tauscher, Tom Lantos, Pete Stark, Anna Eshoo, Zoe Lofgren, Sam Farr, Gary Condit, Cal Dooley, Lois Capps, Brad Sherman, Howard Berman, Henry Waxman, Xavier Becerra, Julian Dixon, Lucille Roybal-Allard, Grace Napolitano, Maxine Waters, Juanita Millender-McDonald, Joe Baca, Loretta Sanchez, and Bob Filner), the governor Gray Davis, 1 distinguished party leader, and 5 add-ons.

Pledged national convention delegates
Type	Del.	Type	Del.	Type	Del.	Type	Del.
CD1	5	CD14	5	CD27	5	CD40	4
CD2	5	CD15	5	CD28	4	CD41	4
CD3	5	CD16	5	CD29	6	CD42	4
CD4	5	CD17	5	CD30	4	CD43	4
CD5	5	CD18	4	CD31	4	CD44	4
CD6	6	CD19	4	CD32	5	CD45	4
CD7	5	CD20	4	CD33	4	CD46	4
CD8	6	CD21	4	CD34	5	CD47	4
CD9	6	CD22	5	CD35	5	CD48	4
CD10	5	CD23	5	CD36	5	CD49	5
CD11	4	CD24	5	CD37	4	CD50	4
CD12	5	CD25	4	CD38	5	CD51	4
CD13	5	CD26	4	CD39	4	CD52	4
PLEO			48	At-large			80
Total pledged delegates						367	

== Candidates ==
The following candidates appeared on the ballot:

- Al Gore
- Bill Bradley
- Lyndon LaRouche, Jr.

== Polling ==
Poll source	Date(s)	Sample size	Margin of error	Al Gore (D)	Bill Bradley (D)	Other / undecided (Note: Calculated by taking the difference of 100% and all other candidates combined.)
Yankelovich Partners Inc.	February 25, 2000	467	—	56%	12%	32%
	February 1, 2000	Gore wins the New Hampshire primary				
	January 24, 2000	Gore wins the Iowa caucuses				

== Results ==
2000 California Democratic presidential primary
Candidate	Votes	%	Delegates
Al Gore	2,155,321	81.21	305
Bill Bradley	482,882	18.19	62
Lyndon LaRouche, Jr.	15,911	0.60	
Unallocated	-	-	66
Total	2,654,114 (Note: The popular vote listed is based on official returns of registered Democratic voters from the March 7th blanket primary. While this is an open primary, delegate allocation is based exclusively on the votes of registered Democrats.)	100%	433

2000 California Democratic blanket presidential primary
Candidate	Votes	%	Delegates
Al Gore	2,609,950	79.77	
Bill Bradley	642,654	19.64	
Lyndon LaRouche, Jr.	19,419	0.59	
Write-in votes	6	0.00	
Unallocated	-	-	433
Total	3,272,029 (Note: The popular vote listed is based on official returns of Democratic voters from the March 7th blanket primary. Because this is an open primary, these results reflect what percentage Democratic candidates got from all voters, not exclusively registered Democrats.)	100%	-
