= 2000 Ohio Democratic presidential primary =

- March 7, 2000

169 delegates to the Democratic National Convention (146 pledged, 23 unpledged) The number of pledged delegates received is determined by the popular vote

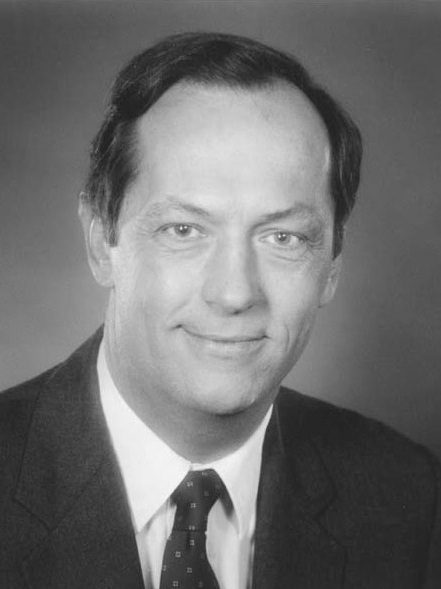
Candidate	Al Gore	Bill Bradley
Home state	Tennessee	New Jersey
Delegate count	109	37
Popular vote	720,311	241,688
Percentage	73.61%	24.70%
- Primary results by county Gore: 50–60% 60–70% 70–80% 80–90%

Pledged national convention delegates
Type	Del.	Type	Del.
CD1	5	CD11	7
CD2	5	CD12	5
CD3	5	CD13	5
CD4	4	CD14	5
CD5	5	CD15	5
CD6	5	CD16	4
CD7	4	CD17	6
CD8	4	CD18	5
CD9	6	CD19	6
CD10	5	CD19	6
PLEO	19	At-large	32
Total pledged delegates			146

The 2000 Ohio Democratic presidential primary took place on March 7, 2000, as one of 15 states and one territory holding primaries on the same day, known as Super Tuesday, in the Democratic Party primaries for the 2000 presidential election. The Ohio primary was a semi-open primary and awarded 169 delegates towards the 2000 Democratic National Convention, of which 146 were pledged delegates allocated based on the results of the primary.

Vice president Al Gore won the primary in a landslide with almost 73% of the vote and 109 delegates, while senator Bill Bradley gained just shy of 25% of the vote, secured 37 delegates, and won his first and only congressional district. The remaining 2% went to one other candidate, Lyndon LaRouche Jr. Gore did not cross the necessary majority of 2,171 delegates to officially win the Democratic nomination after Super Tuesday, but Bradley would withdraw three days later, leaving Gore as the presumptive nominee.

== Procedure ==
Ohio was one of 15 states and one territory holding primaries on Super Tuesday.

Voting took place throughout the state from 7:30 a.m. until 7:30 p.m. In the semi-open primary, candidates had to meet a threshold of 15 percent at the congressional district or statewide level in order to be considered viable. The 146 pledged delegates to the 2000 Democratic National Convention were allocated proportionally on the basis of the results of the primary. Of these, between 4 and 7 were allocated to each of the state's 19 congressional districts and another 19 were allocated to party leaders and elected officials (PLEO delegates), in addition to 32 at-large delegates.

District delegates to the national convention were planned to be elected at post-primary caucuses on April 16, 2020; should candidates have received more delegates based on the results of the primary than delegate candidates presented at the time. The state executive committee of the party subsequently would have met on May 9, 2020, to vote on the 32 at-large and 19 pledged PLEO delegates for the Democratic National Convention. The delegation also included 20 unpledged PLEO delegates: 12 members of the Democratic National Committee, 8 members of Congress (Representatives Tony Hall, Ted Strickland, Marcy Kaptur, Dennis Kucinich, Stephanie Tubbs Jones, Sherrod Brown, Thomas Sawyer, and James Traficant), and 3 add-ons.

== Candidates ==
The following candidates appeared on the ballot:

- Al Gore
- Bill Bradley
- Lyndon LaRouche Jr.

== Polling ==
Poll source	Date(s)	Sample size	Margin of error	Al Gore (D)	Bill Bradley (D)	Other / undecided (Note: Calculated by taking the difference of 100% and all other candidates combined.)
SurveyUSA	March 4, 2000	510	—	62%	19%	19%
Zogby Analytics	March 4, 2000	408	—	68%	21%	11%
Mason-Dixon Polling & Strategy	March 3, 2000	417	—	67%	24%	9%
University of Cincinnati (Ohio Poll)	March 3, 2000	373	—	72%	25%	3%
Zogby Analytics	March 1, 2000	403	—	73%	17%	10%
Columbus Dispatch	February 29, 2000	2,892 (RV)	—	73%	26%	1%
University of Cincinnati (Ohio Poll)	February 25, 2000	320	—	69%	22%	9%
	February 1, 2000	Gore wins the New Hampshire primary				
	January 24, 2000	Gore wins the Iowa caucuses				

== Results ==
2000 Ohio Democratic presidential primary
Candidate	Votes	%	Delegates
Al Gore	720,311	73.61	109
Bill Bradley	241,688	24.70	37
Lyndon LaRouche Jr.	16,513	1.69	
Uncommitted	-	-	23
Total	978,512	100%	269
