= 2000 Rhode Island Democratic presidential primary =

- March 7, 2000

33 delegates to the Democratic National Convention (22 pledged, 11 unpledged) The number of pledged delegates received is determined by the popular vote

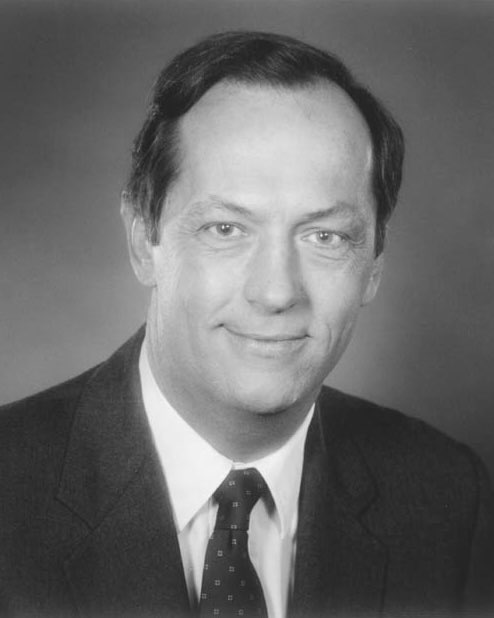
Candidate	Al Gore	Bill Bradley
Home state	Tennessee	New Jersey
Delegate count	13	9
Popular vote	26,801	19,000
Percentage	56.92%	40.35%
- Gore: 40–50% 50–60% 60–70% 70–80% Bradley: 50–60% 60–70%

The 2000 Rhode Island Democratic presidential primary took place on March 7, 2000, as one of 15 states and one territory holding primaries on the same day, known as Super Tuesday, in the Democratic Party primaries for the 2000 presidential election. The Rhode Island primary was a semi-closed primary, with the state awarding 33 delegates, of whom 22 were pledged delegates allocated on the basis of the primary results.

Vice president Al Gore won the primary with almost 57% of the vote and 13 delegates, while senator Bill Bradley won only roughly 40% of the vote and secured 9 delegates. The remaining 3% went to one other candidate, Lyndon LaRouche Jr., write-in votes and an uncommitted option. Gore did not cross the necessary majority of 2,171 delegates to officially win the Democratic nomination after Super Tuesday, but Bradley would withdraw three days later, leaving Gore as the presumptive nominee.

== Procedure ==
Rhode Island was one of 15 states and one territory holding primaries on Super Tuesday.

Voting took place throughout the state from 7 a.m. until 8 p.m. In the semi-closed primary, candidates had to meet a threshold of 15% at the congressional district or statewide level to be considered viable. The 26 pledged delegates to the 2000 Democratic National Convention were allocated proportionally on the basis of the results of the primary. Of these, 7 each were allocated to both of the state's 2 congressional districts and another 3 were allocated to party leaders and elected officials (PLEO delegates), in addition to 5 at-large delegates.

The delegation also included 9 unpledged PLEO delegates: 7 members of the Democratic National Committee, 3 members of Congress (One senator, Jack Reed, and two representatives, Patrick Kennedy and Robert Weygand), and 1 add-on.

Pledged national convention delegates
Type	Del.
CD1	7
CD2	7
PLEO	3
At-large	5
Total pledged delegates	22

== Candidates ==
The following candidates appeared on the ballot:

- Al Gore
- Bill Bradley
- Lyndon LaRouche Jr.

There was also an uncommitted option.

== Polling ==
Poll source	Date(s)	Sample size	Margin of error	Al Gore (D)	Bill Bradley (D)	Other / undecided (Note: Calculated by taking the difference of 100% and all other candidates combined.)
Brown University A. Alfred Taubman Center for American Politics and Policy	February 20, 2000	222 (RV)	—	37%	24%	39%
	February 1, 2000	Gore wins the New Hampshire primary				
	January 24, 2000	Gore wins the Iowa caucuses				

== Results ==
2000 Rhode Island Democratic presidential primary
Candidate	Votes	%	Delegates
Al Gore	26,801	56.92	13
Bill Bradley	19,000	40.35	9
Uncommitted	844	1.79	11
Write-in votes	241	0.51	
Lyndon LaRouche Jr.	199	0.42	
Total	46,844	100%	33
