= 2000 Maryland Democratic presidential primary =

- March 7, 2000

95 delegates to the Democratic National Convention (68 pledged, 27 unpledged) The number of pledged delegates received is determined by the popular vote

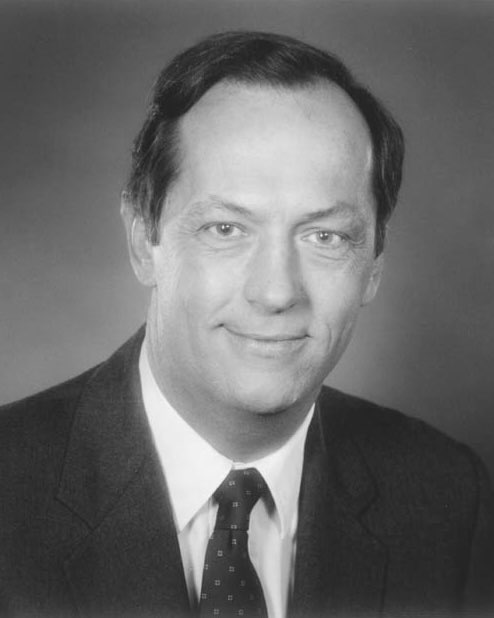
Candidate	Al Gore	Bill Bradley
Home state	Tennessee	New Jersey
Delegate count	49	19
Popular vote	341,630	144,387
Percentage	67.32%	28.45%
- Primary results by county Gore: 50–60% 60–70% 70–80% 80–90%

Pledged national convention delegates
Type	Del.
CD1	5
CD2	5
CD3	6
CD4	7
CD5	5
CD6	4
CD7	6
CD8	6
PLEO	9
At-large	15
Total pledged delegates	68

The 2000 Maryland Democratic presidential primary took place on March 7, 2000, as one of 16 contests scheduled on Super Tuesday in the Democratic Party primaries for the U.S. 2000 presidential election. The Maryland primary was a closed primary, with the state awarding 95 delegates to the 2000 Democratic National Convention, of whom 68 were pledged delegates allocated on the basis of the primary results.

Vice president Al Gore won the primary with 67% of the vote. Senator Bill Bradley, who would withdraw in the days following from the presidential race but still competed for delegates, and reached only less than 28%, one of his lowest results so far in the race. The remaining 4% were separated between Lyndon LaRouche Jr. and the "uncommitted" option.

== Procedure ==
Maryland was one of 15 states and one territory holding primaries on March 7, 2000, also known as "Super Tuesday".

Voting took place throughout the state from 7 a.m. until 8 p.m. In the closed primary, candidates had to meet a threshold of 15% at the congressional district or statewide level in order to be considered viable. The 68 pledged delegates to the 2000 Democratic National Convention were allocated proportionally on the basis of the primary results. Of these, between 4 and 7 were allocated to each of the state's 8 congressional districts and another 9 were allocated to party leaders and elected officials (PLEO delegates), in addition to 15 at-large delegates.

The delegation also included 24 unpledged PLEO delegates: 18 members of the Democratic National Committee, 6 members of Congress (both senators, Barbara Mikulski and Paul Sarbanes, and 4 representatives, Ben Cardin, Albert Wynn, Steny Hoyer, and Elijah Cummings), the governor Parris Glendening, and 1 add-on.

== Candidates ==
The following candidates appeared on the ballot:

- Al Gore
- Bill Bradley
- Lyndon LaRouche Jr.

There was also an uncommitted option.

== Polling ==
Poll source	Date(s)	Sample size	Margin of error	Al Gore (D)	Bill Bradley (D)	Other / undecided (Note: Calculated by taking the difference of 100% and all other candidates combined.)
Mason-Dixon Polling & Strategy	February 27, 2000	421	—	59%	28%	13%
Potomac Incorporated	February 26, 2000	434	—	58%	23%	19%
	February 1, 2000	Gore wins the New Hampshire primary				
	January 24, 2000	Gore wins the Iowa caucuses				

== Results ==
2000 Maryland Democratic presidential primary
Candidate	Votes	%	Delegates
Al Gore	341,630	67.32	49
Bill Bradley	144,387	28.45	19
Uncommitted	16,935	3.34	
Lyndon LaRouche Jr.	4,510	0.89	
Unallocated	-	-	27
Total	507,462	100%	95
