= 2000 Democratic Party presidential primaries =

Selection of the Democratic Party nominee

- January 24 to June 6, 2000

4,338 delegates to the Democratic National Convention; 2,170 (majority) needed to win

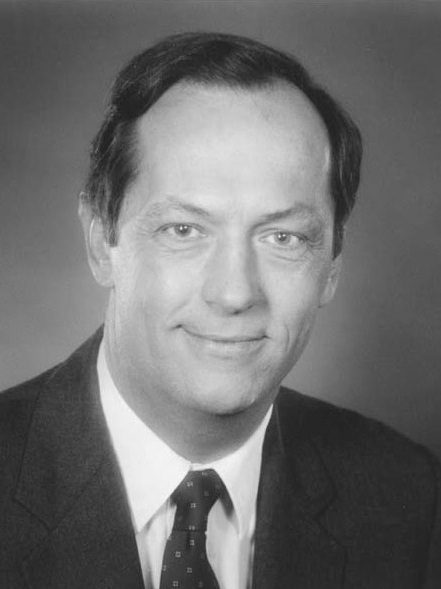
Candidate	Al Gore	Bill Bradley
Home state	Tennessee	New Jersey
Delegate count	3,007	522
Contests won	56	0
Popular vote	10,626,568	2,798,281
Percentage	75.8%	20.0%
- Al Gore
Previous Democratic nominee
Bill Clinton
Democratic nominee
Al Gore

From January 24 to June 6, 2000, voters of the Democratic Party chose its nominee for president in the 2000 United States presidential election. Vice President Al Gore was selected as the nominee through a series of primary elections and caucuses, culminating in the 2000 Democratic National Convention held from August 14 to 17, 2000, in Los Angeles, California. Gore lost the general election against Texas governor George W. Bush held on November 7.

== Primary race overview ==
The apparent front runner, incumbent Vice President Al Gore of Tennessee, only faced one major candidate in the primaries, former U.S. senator Bill Bradley of New Jersey. Both men campaigned to succeed term-limited incumbent Bill Clinton. During the course of the five-month primary season, Gore won every primary contest over his opponent, and easily won the party's nomination for the 2000 election.

Bradley, a former U.S. senator and NBA player, had long been considered a potential Democratic contender for the presidency. In December 1998, Bradley formed a presidential exploratory committee and began organizing a campaign. Gore, however, was considered the favorite for the Democratic nomination as early as 1997, with the commencement of Clinton's second term as president. Though numerous other candidates tested the waters, including Massachusetts senator John Kerry, Vermont governor Howard Dean, Missouri congressman Richard Gephardt, and Jesse Jackson, only Gore and Bradley ultimately entered the contest.

Bradley campaigned as a more liberal alternative to Gore, arguing for universal health care, gun control, and campaign finance reform. Bradley also campaign on his sponsorship of the Tax Reform Act of 1986, which had significantly cut income tax rates while abolishing dozens of loopholes. Bradley claimed that the best possible tax code would be one with low rates and no loopholes but refused to rule out the possibility of a tax increase to pay for his healthcare proposals.

On public education, Bradley pushed for increased federal funding for local schools under Title I, as well as the expansion of the Head Start program. He further promised to bring 60,000 new teachers into the education system annually by offering college scholarships to anyone who agreed to teach after their college graduation. Bradley also made child poverty a significant issue in his campaign, having opposed the Clinton administration's welfare reform agenda. He called for repeal the Personal Responsibility and Work Opportunity Act, which he had voted against and claimed would result in even higher poverty levels. He also promised to increase the minimum wage, expand earned income tax credits, allow single parents to receive both welfare and child support payments, make dependent care tax credits refundable, build support homes for pregnant teenagers, and increase the availability of food stamps.

Although both Gore and Bradley showed comparable fundraising, Bradley lagged behind Gore in many polls from the start and never gained a competitive position. Despite the late endorsement of the Des Moines Register, Bradley lost the Iowa caucuses in a landslide; Gore garnered 62.9 percent of state delegates elected, while Bradley received only 36.6 percent. Gore narrowly won the primary competition in New Hampshire as well, receiving 49.7 percent of the popular vote to Bradley's 46.6 percent. On March 7, Super Tuesday, Bradley attracted some support in various primaries, especially in northeastern states, but he failed to gain the majority of delegates in any of these competitions. He withdrew from the race two days later, on March 9.

Since the advent of the modern presidential primary system began in 1972, Gore remains the only non-incumbent (Republican or Democrat) to sweep all the nominating contests held in a given year.

== Candidates ==
=== Nominee ===
Candidate	Most recent office	Home state	Campaign	Popular vote	Contests won	Running mate
Al Gore	Vice president of the United States (1993–2001)	Tennessee	(Campaign); Secured nomination: March 14, 2000	10,885,814 (75.4%)	56	Joe Lieberman

=== Withdrew during primaries or convention ===
Candidate	Most recent office	Home state	Campaign	Popular vote	Contests won
Bill Bradley	U.S. senator from New Jersey (1979–1997)	New Jersey	(Campaign); Withdrew: March 9, 2000	3,027,912 (21.0%)	0
Lyndon LaRouche	Founder of the LaRouche movement and perennial candidate	New Hampshire	(Campaign)	276,075 (1.19%)	0

=== Declined ===
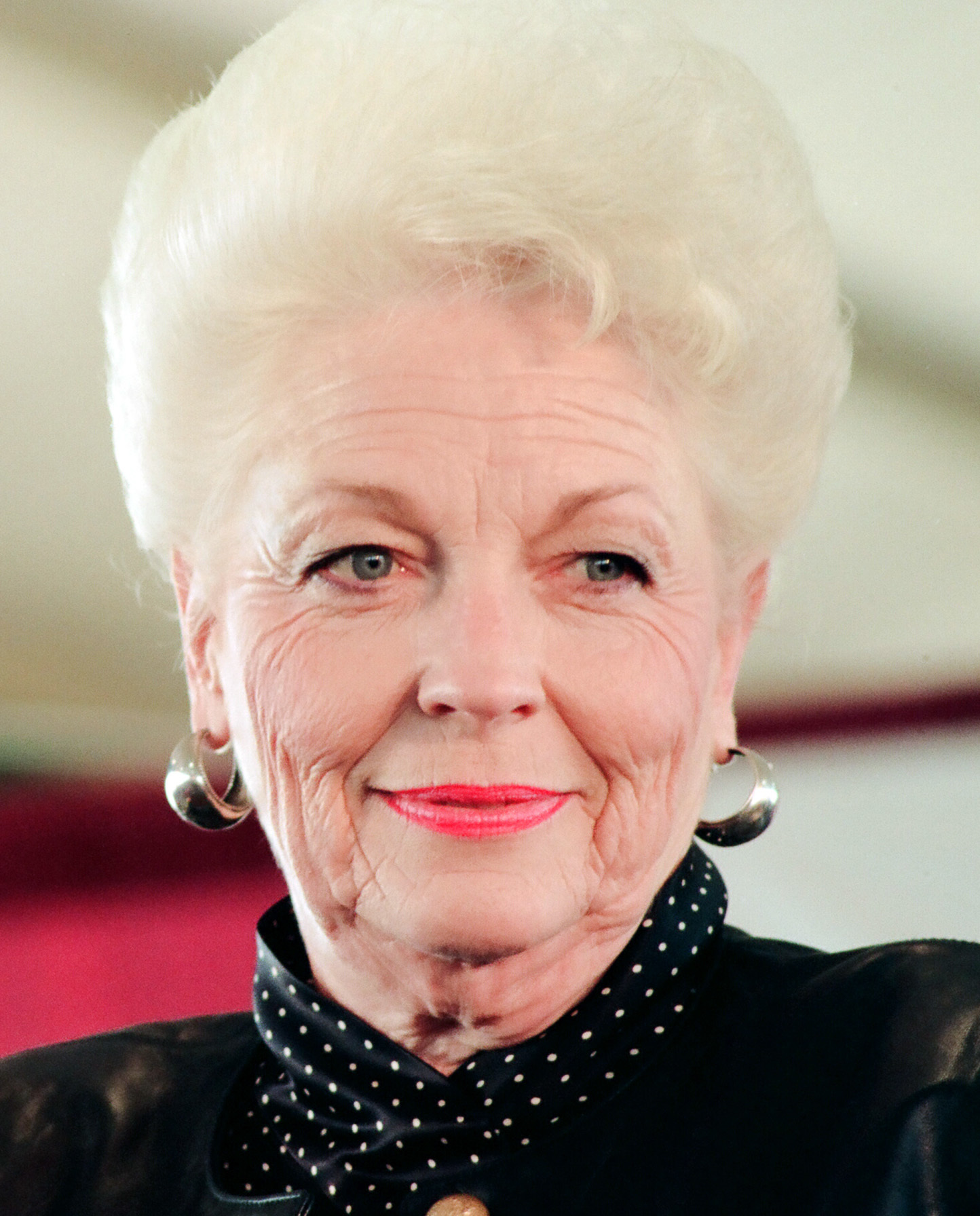
Ann Richards, former governor of Texas

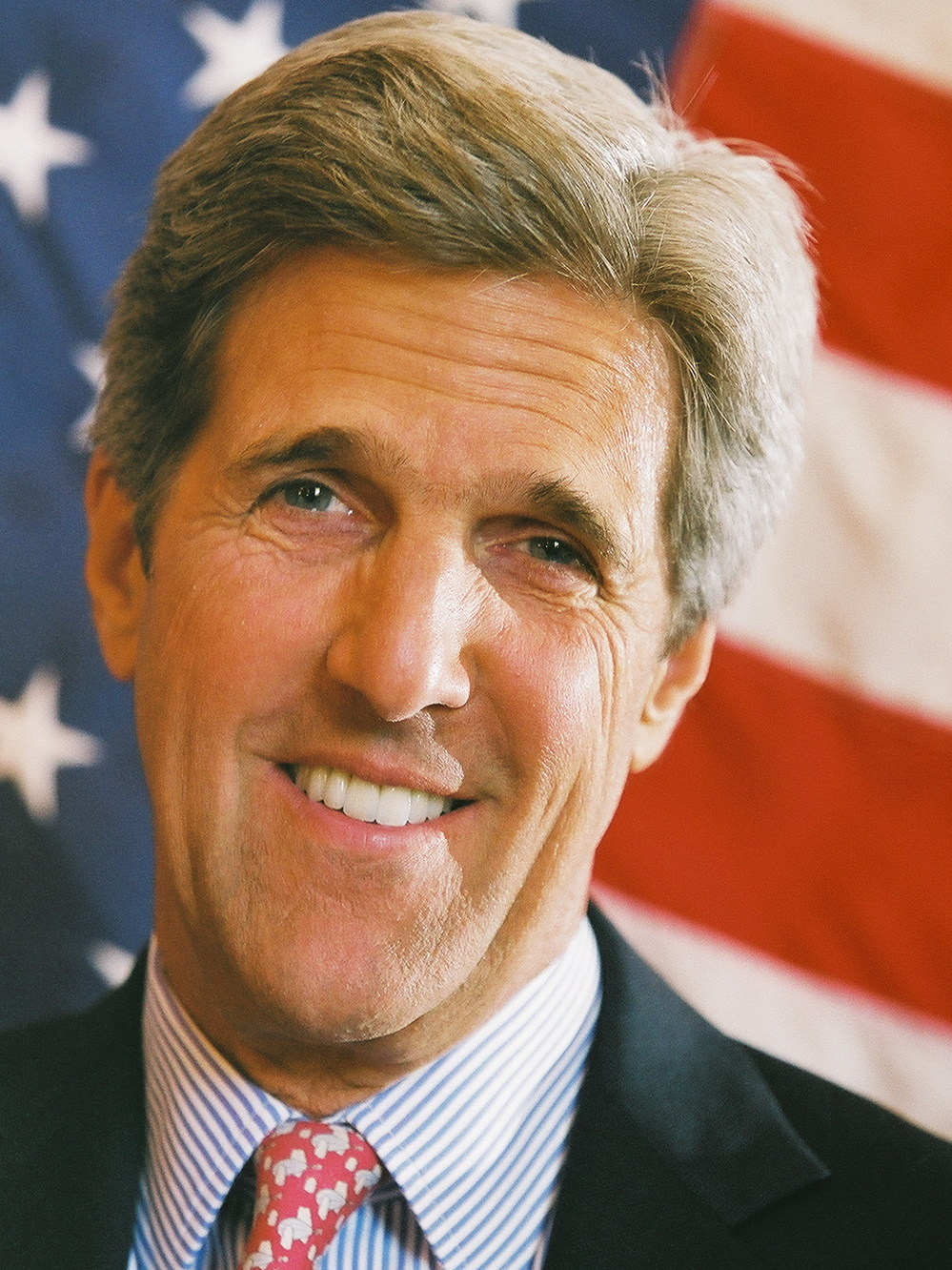
John Kerry, U.S. senator from Massachusetts

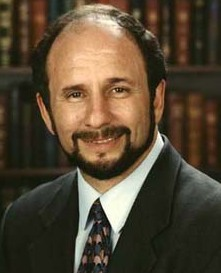
Paul Wellstone, U.S. senator from Minnesota

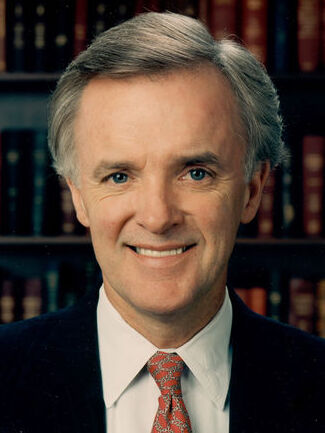
Bob Kerrey, U.S. senator from Nebraska

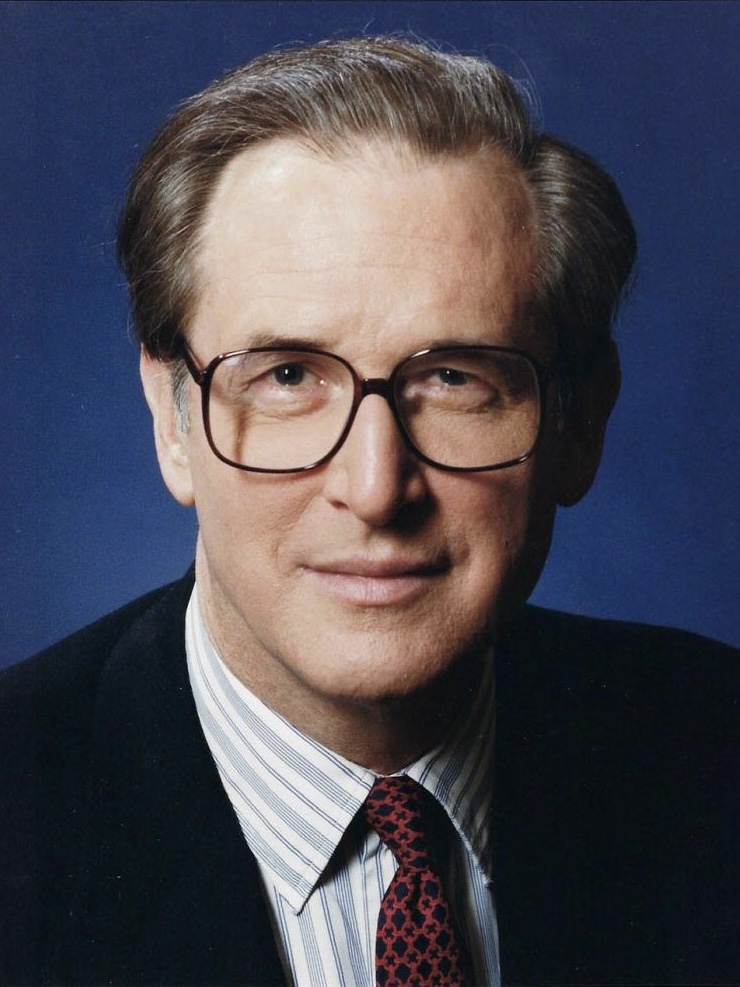
Jay Rockefeller, U.S. senator from West Virginia

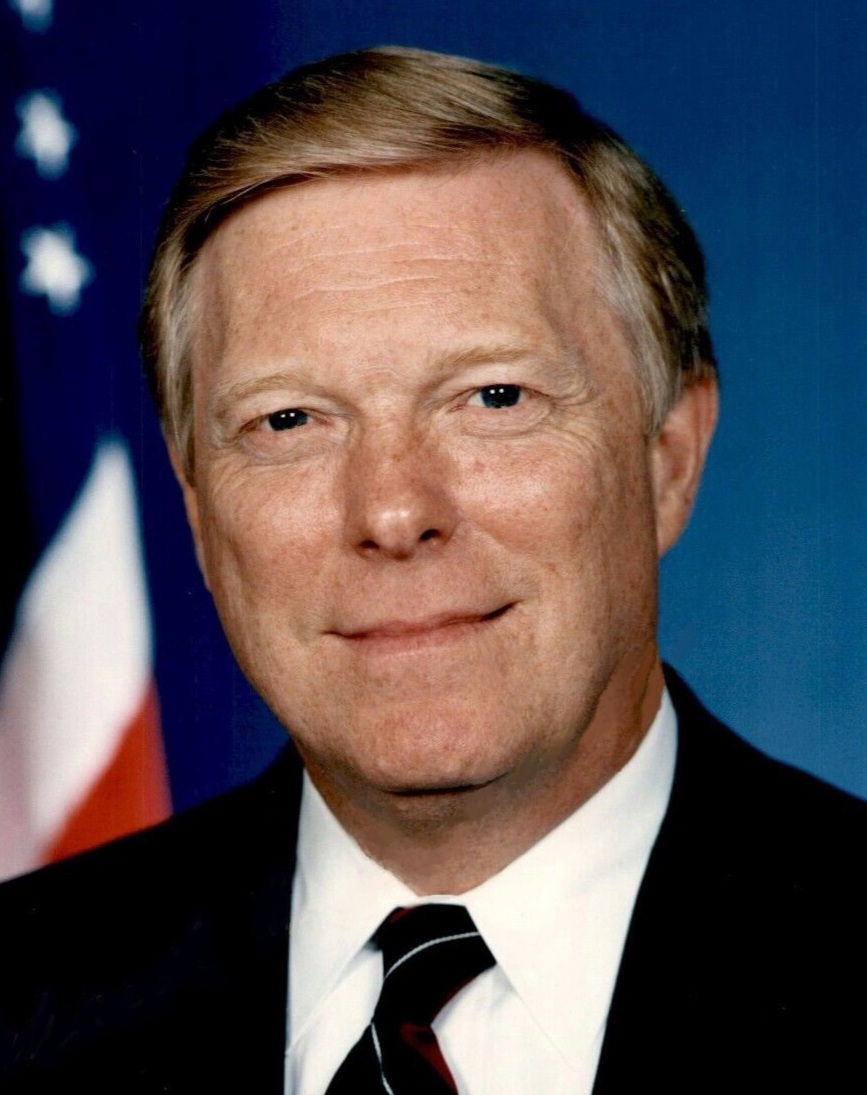
Dick Gephardt, House minority leader

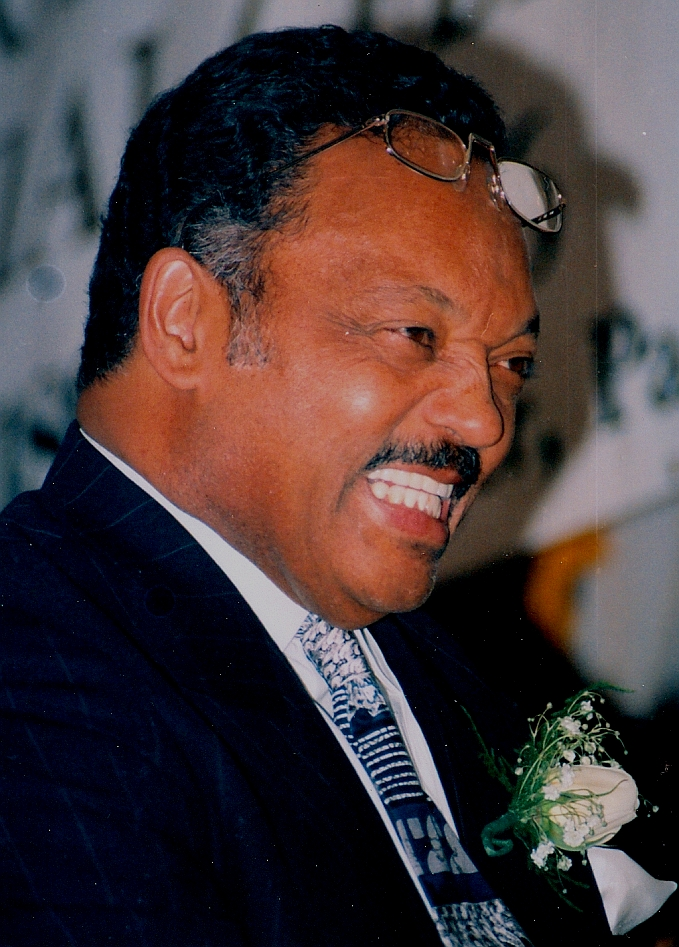
Jesse Jackson, civil rights activist and former presidential candidate

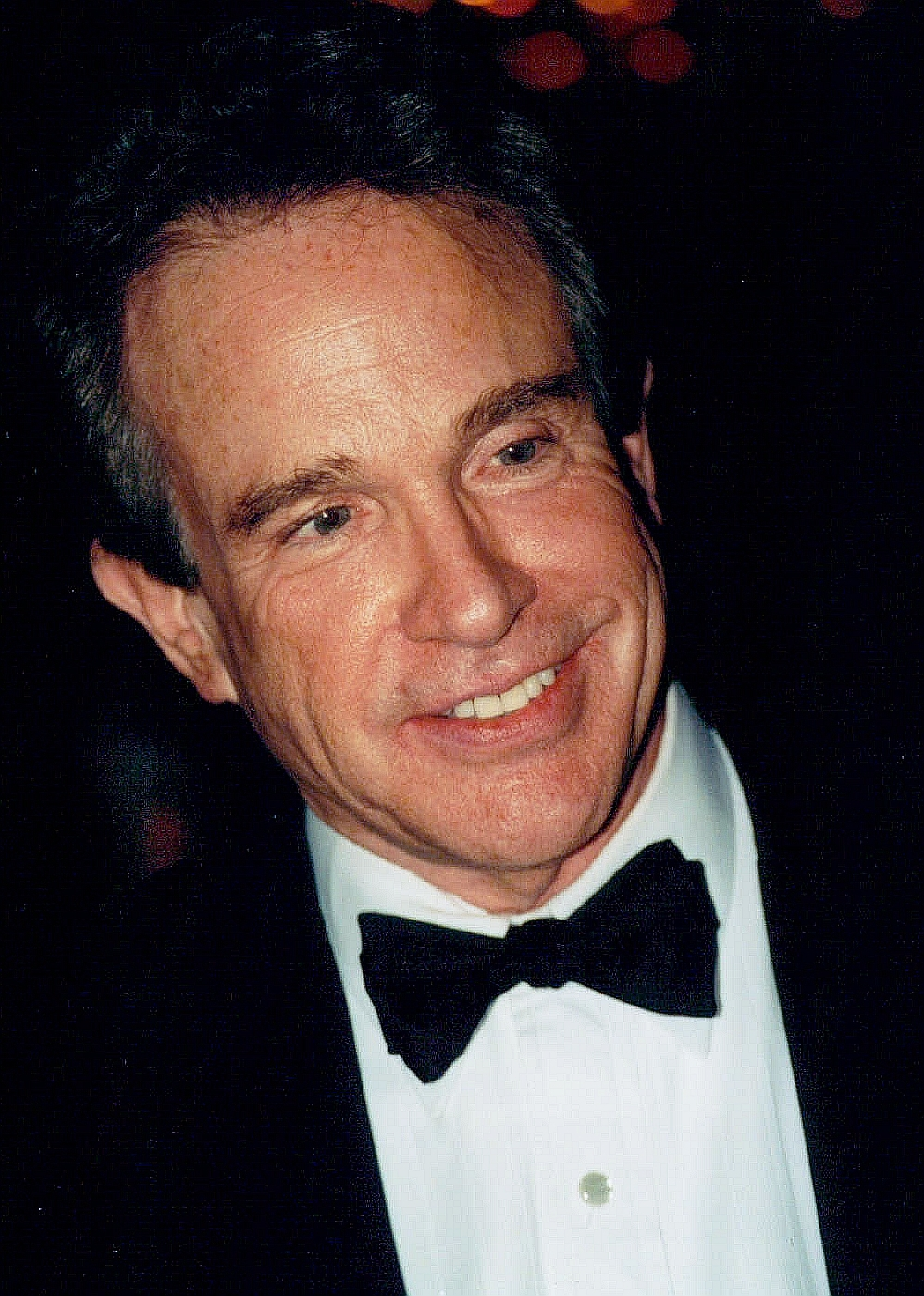
Warren Beatty, actor

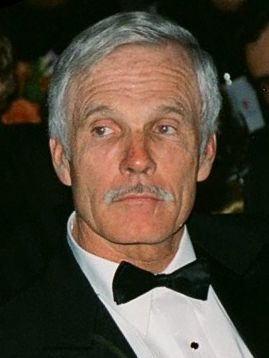
Ted Turner, media mogul

== Polling ==
Poll source	Date(s)	Sample size	Margin of error	Al Gore	Bill Bradley	Jesse Jackson	Dick Gephardt	John Kerry	Bob Kerrey	Paul Wellstone	Other / undecided (Note: Calculated by taking the difference of 100% and all other candidates combined.)
Gallup	November 4–7, 1999	–	–	58%	33%	–	–	–	–	–	9%
Gallup	October 21–24, 1999	–	–	57%	32%	–	–	–	–	–	11%
Gallup	October 8–10, 1999	–	–	51%	39%	–	–	–	–	–	10%
Gallup	September 10–14, 1999	–	–	63%	30%	–	–	–	–	–	7%
Gallup	Aug. 16–18, 1999	–	–	58%	31%	–	–	–	–	–	11%
CBS News	August 4, 1999	–	–	51%	21%	–	–	–	–	–	28%
Gallup	June 25–27, 1999	–	–	64%	28%	–	–	–	–	–	8%
Gallup	June 4–5, 1999	–	–	63%	28%	–	–	–	–	–	9%
Gallup	May 23–24, 1999	–	–	59%	30%	–	–	–	–	–	11%
Gallup	April 30–May 2, 1999	–	–	66%	23%	–	–	–	–	–	11%
Gallup	April 13–14, 1999	–	–	54%	34%	–	–	–	–	–	12%
Gallup	March 12–14, 1999	–	–	58%	21%	15%	–	–	–	–	6%
Gallup	January 8–10, 1999	–	–	47%	12%	11%	13%	5%	–	1%	11%
Gallup	October 23–25, 1998	–	–	41%	15%	11%	14%	4%	4%	1%	10%
Gallup	May 8–10, 1998	–	–	51%	8%	12%	7%	2%	3%	1%	16%
Gallup	September 6–7, 1997	–	–	49%	13%	15%	7%	5%	4%	0%	7%

== Schedule and results ==
Date (daily totals)	Total pledged delegates	Contest and total popular vote	Delegates won and popular vote		
Date (daily totals)	Total pledged delegates	Contest and total popular vote	Al Gore	Bill Bradley	Other
January 24	47	Iowa	29; 1,257 (62.8%)	18; 732 (36.6%)	11 (0.6%)
February 1	22	New Hampshire; 154,639	13; 76,897 (49.7%)	9; 70,502 (45.6%)	7,240 (4.7%)
February 5	0	Delaware	[data missing]		
February 29	0	Washington	[data missing]		
March 7 (1,310) (Super Tuesday)	6	American Samoa; 25	2.5; 21 (84.0%)	0.5; 4 (16.0%)	3
March 7 (1,310) (Super Tuesday)	367	California; 2,644,114	3052,155,321 (81.2%)	62; 482,882 (18.2%)	15,911 (0.6%)
March 7 (1,310) (Super Tuesday)	54	Connecticut; 177,301	3099,563 (55.6%)	24; 74,075 (41.4%)	5,418 (3.0%)
March 7 (1,310) (Super Tuesday)	77	Georgia; 284,431	65238,396 (83.8%)	12; 46,035 (16.2%)	—
March 7 (1,310) (Super Tuesday)	20	Hawaii	20	2	11
March 7 (1,310) (Super Tuesday)	18	Idaho	14; 240 (62.8%)	4; 126 (33.0%)	16 (4.2%)
March 7 (1,310) (Super Tuesday)	23	Maine; 64,279	1334,725 (54.0%)	10; 26,250 (41.3%)	400 (0.6%)
March 7 (1,310) (Super Tuesday)	68	Maryland; 507,462	49; 341,630 (67.3%)	19; 144,387 (28.5%)	21,445 (19.8%)0.89%
March 7 (1,310) (Super Tuesday)	93	Massachusetts; 570,074	58; 341,586 (59.8%)	35; 212,452 (37.2%)	17,489 (3.0%)
March 7 (1,310) (Super Tuesday)	75	Missouri; 265,489	51; 171,562 (64.6%)	24; 89,092 (33.6%)	4,835 (1.8%)
March 7 (1,310) (Super Tuesday)	243	New York; 973,463	158; 639,417 (65.6%)	85; 326,038 (33.5%)	9,008 (0.9%)
March 7 (1,310) (Super Tuesday)	14	North Dakota; 2,188	113; 1,711 (78.2%)	477 (21.8%)	—
March 7 (1,310) (Super Tuesday)	146	Ohio; 978,512	109; 720,311 (73.6%)	37; 241,688 (24.7%)	16,513 (1.7%)
March 7 (1,310) (Super Tuesday)	22	Rhode Island; 46,844	13; 26,801 (56.9%)	9; 19,000 (40.3%)	1,284 (2.7%)
March 7 (1,310) (Super Tuesday)	15	Vermont; 49,283	9; 26,774 (54.3%)	6; 21,629 (43.9%)	880 (1.8%)
March 7 (1,310) (Super Tuesday)	75	Washington	[data missing]		
March 9	43	South Carolina; 9,657	43; 8,864 (91.8%)	172 (1.8%)	514 (6.4%)
March 10 (75)	51	Colorado; 88,735	44; 63,384 (71.4%)	7; 20,663 (23.3%)	4,688 (5.3%)
March 10 (75)	24	Utah; 15,687	21; 12,527 (79.9%)	3; 3,160 (20.1%)	—
March 11 (250)	47	Arizona; 86,762	40; 67,582 (77.9%)	7; 16,383 (18.9%)	2,797 (3.2%)
March 11 (250)	129	Michigan; 19,160	120; 15,853 (82.7%)	9; 3,117 (16.3%)	190 (1.0%)
March 11 (250)	74	Minnesota; 15,000	72; 11,100 (74.0%)	1,800 (12.0%)	2,100 (14.0%)
March 12	20	Nevada; 934	20; 912 (98.0%)	22 (2.0%)	—
March 14 (566)	161	Florida; 551,916	144; 451,718 (81.8%)	17; 100,277 (18.2%)	—
March 14 (566)	61	Louisiana; 157,551	54; 114,942 (73.0%)	7; 31,385 (19.9%)	11,224 (7.1%)
March 14 (566)	37	Mississippi; 88,602	37; 79,408 (89.6%)	7,621 (86.%)	1,573 (1.8%)
March 14 (566)	45	Oklahoma; 134,850	38; 92,654 (68.7%)	7; 34,311 (25.4%)	7,885 (5.9%)
March 14 (566)	68	Tennessee; 215,203	68; 198,264 (92.1%)	11,323 (5.3%)	5,616 (2.6%)
March 14 (566)	194	Texas; 786,890	182; 631,428 (80.2%)	12; 128,564 (16.3%)	26,898 (3.4%)
March 18	3	Guam	3	—	—
March 21	161	Illinois; 809,667	149; 682,932 (84.3%)	12; 115,320 (14.2%)	11,415 (1.4%)
March 25	13	Wyoming; 261	13; 223 (85.4%)	13 (5.0%)	19 (7.3%)
March 27	15	Delaware	[data missing]		
April 1	3	Virgin Islands; 748	3; 748 (100.0%)	—	—
April 2	51	Puerto Rico	51	—	7
April 4 (238)	161	Pennsylvania; 704,150	139; 525,306 (74.2%)	21; 146,797 (20.7%)	35,887 (5.1%)
April 4 (238)	77	Wisconsin; 371,196	77; 328,682 (88.5%)	32,560 (8.8%)	6,259 (2.7%)
April 15	79	Virginia	79	—	—
April 22	13	Alaska	13	—	—
May 2 (175)	17	Washington, D.C. 19,417	0; 0 (95.9%)	—	796 (4.1%)
May 2 (175)	72	Indiana; 293,172	62; 219,604 (74.9%)	10; 64,339 (21.9%)	9,229 (3.1%)
May 2 (175)	86	North Carolina; 544,922	73; 383,696 (70.4%)	13; 99,796 (18.3%)	61,430 (11.3%)
May 9 (56)	26	Nebraska; 105,271	21; 73,639 (69.4%)	5; 27,884 (26.3%)	4,622 (4.3%)
May 9 (56)	30	West Virginia; 253,310	27; 182,403 (72.0%)	3; 46,710 (18.4%)	24,197 (9.6%)
May 16	47	Oregon; 354,594	0; 300,922 (84.9%)	—	53,672 (15.1%)
May 23 (86)	37	Arkansas; 246,900	37; 193,750 (78.5%)	—	53,150 (21.5%)
May 23 (86)	0	Idaho; 35,688	27,025 (75.7%)	—	8,663 (24.3%)
May 23 (86)	49	Kentucky; 220,279	46; 156,966 (71.3%)	3; 32,340 (14.7%)	30,973 (14.0%)
June 6 (217)	54	Alabama; 278,527	54; 214,541 (77.0%)	—	90,220 (23.0%)
June 6 (217)	17	Montana; 87,867	15; 68,420 (77.9%)	—	2; 19,447 (22.1%)
June 6 (217)	105	New Jersey; 378,272	105; 358,951 (94.9%)	—	19,321 (5.1%)
June 6 (217)	26	New Mexico	23; 98,715 (74.6%)	3; 27,204 (20.6%)	6,361 (4.8%)
June 6 (217)	15	South Dakota	22	—	—
Total			3,007 10,626,568 (75.8%)	522 2,798,281 (20.0%)	9 595,302 (4.2%)

== Vice presidential selection ==
Connecticut Senator Joe Lieberman was nominated for vice president by voice vote. Lieberman became the first Jewish American ever to be chosen for this position by a major party. Other potential running-mates included:

- Tom Harkin, U.S. senator from Iowa
- Evan Bayh, U.S. senator from Indiana
- Barbara Boxer, U.S. senator from California
- John Edwards, U.S. senator from North Carolina
- Dianne Feinstein, U.S. senator from California
- Barbara Mikulski, U.S. senator from Maryland
- Dick Gephardt, U.S. House Minority Leader from Missouri
- Bob Graham, U.S. senator from Florida
- Jim Hunt, Governor of North Carolina
- John Kerry, U.S. senator from Massachusetts
- Bob Kerrey, U.S. senator and former Governor from Nebraska
- Zell Miller, U.S. senator from Georgia
- George Mitchell, former Senate Majority Leader from Maine
- Sam Nunn, former U.S. senator from Georgia
- Jeanne Shaheen, Governor of New Hampshire

== Maps ==
Results in popular vote margin, by state

Results of popular vote, by county

Results in popular vote margin, by county

== See also ==
- 2000 Republican Party presidential primaries
