= 2000 Massachusetts Democratic presidential primary =

- March 7, 2000

118 delegates to the Democratic National Convention (93 pledged, 25 unpledged) The number of pledged delegates received is determined by the popular vote

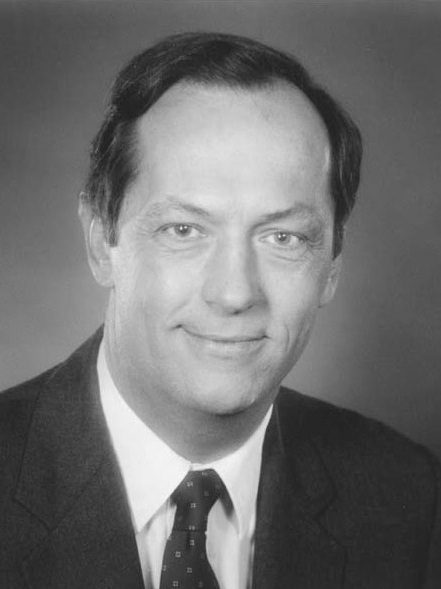
Candidate	Al Gore	Bill Bradley
Home state	Tennessee	New Jersey
Delegate count	58	35
Popular vote	341,586	212,452
Percentage	59.77%	37.17%
- Gore: 40–50% 50–60% 60–70% 70–80% 80–90% Bradley: 40–50% 50–60% Tie: 50–60%

The 2000 Massachusetts Democratic presidential primary took place on March 7, as one of 16 contests scheduled on Super Tuesday in the Democratic Party primaries for the 2000 presidential election, following the Washington primary the weekend before. The Massachusetts primary was a semi-closed primary, with the state awarding 118 delegates towards the 2000 Democratic National Convention, of which 93 were pledged delegates allocated on the basis of the results of the primary.

Vice president Al Gore came in first with just shy of 60% and earned 58 delegates. Senator Bradley finished behind in second place with a little more than 37% and 35 delegates, while Uncommitted votes took a third-place finish with around 1% of the vote.

== Procedure ==
Massachusetts was one of 15 states and one territory holding primaries on March 7, 2000, also known as "Super Tuesday".

Voting took place throughout the state from 7:00 a.m. until 8:00 p.m. In the semi-closed primary, candidates had to meet a threshold of 15 percent at the congressional district or statewide level to be considered viable. The 93 pledged delegates to the 2000 Democratic National Convention were allocated proportionally on the basis of the results of the primary. Of these, between 6 and 7 were allocated to each of the state's 10 congressional districts and another 12 were allocated to party leaders and elected officials (PLEO delegates), in addition to 20 at-large delegates.

The state party committee met and voted on the 20 at-large and 12 pledged PLEO delegates for the Democratic National Convention. The delegation was joined by 23 unpledged PLEO delegates: 9 members of the Democratic National Committee, 12 members of Congress (both senators, Ted Kennedy and John Kerry, and 10 representatives, John Olver, Richard Neal, Jim McGovern, Barney Frank, Marty Meehan, John Tierney, Ed Markey, Mike Capuano, Joe Moakley, and Bill Delahunt), 2 distinguished party leaders, and 2 add-ons.

Pledged national convention delegates
Type	Del.	Type	Del.
CD1	6	CD6	6
CD2	6	CD7	6
CD3	6	CD8	6
CD4	6	CD9	7
CD5	6	CD10	6
PLEO	12	At-large	20
Total pledged delegates			93

== Candidates ==
The following candidates appeared on the ballot:

- Al Gore
- Bill Bradley
- Lyndon LaRouche Jr.

== Polling ==
Poll source	Date(s)	Sample size	Margin of error	Al Gore (D)	Bill Bradley (D)	Other / undecided (Note: Calculated by taking the difference of 100% and all other candidates combined.)
University of Massachusetts Department of Political Science	March 4, 2000	400	—	57%	31%	12%
University of Massachusetts Department of Political Science	February 29, 2000	400	—	54%	34%	12%
University of Massachusetts Department of Political Science	February 27, 2000	400	—	50%	37%	13%
RKM Research and Communications Inc.	February 25, 2000	404	—	53%	29%	18%
KRC Research	February 23, 2000	873	—	59%	27%	14%
University of Massachusetts Department of Political Science	February 20, 2000	400	—	50%	35%	15%
	February 1, 2000	Gore wins the New Hampshire primary				
	January 24, 2000	Gore wins the Iowa caucuses				

== Results ==
2000 Massachusetts Democratic presidential primary
Candidate	Votes	%	Delegates
Al Gore	341,586	59.77	58
Bill Bradley	212,452	37.17	35
Uncommitted	11,281	1.97	25
Write-in votes	4,073	0.71	
Lyndon LaRouche Jr.	2,135	0.37	
Total	570,074	100%	118
