= 2000 Vermont Democratic presidential primary =

- March 7, 2000

22 delegates to the Democratic National Convention (15 pledged, 7 unpledged) The number of pledged delegates received is determined by the popular vote

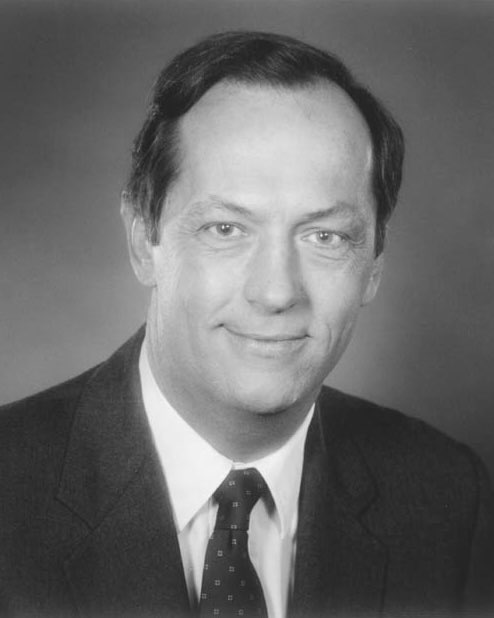
Candidate	Al Gore	Bill Bradley
Home state	Tennessee	New Jersey
Delegate count	9	6
Popular vote	26,774	21,629
Percentage	54.33%	43.89%
- Gore: 40–50% 50–60% 60–70% 70–80% 80–90% 90–100% Bradley: 40–50% 50–60% 60–70% 80–90% Tie: 40–50% 50–60% No votes

Pledged national convention delegates
Type	Del.
CD at-large	10
PLEO	2
At-large	3
Total pledged delegates	15

The 2000 Vermont Democratic presidential primary took place on March 7, 2000, as one of 16 contests scheduled on Super Tuesday in the Democratic Party primaries for the 2000 presidential election, following the Washington primary the week before. The Vermont primary was an open primary, with the state awarding 22 delegates towards the 2000 Democratic National Convention, of which 15 were pledged delegates allocated on the basis of the results of the primary.

Vice president Al Gore won the primary by a closer margin than other contests, gaining over 50% of the vote and 9 delegates. Senator Bill Bradley gave a strong performance with almost 44% of the vote and kept the delegate count close, but was not competitive enough to gain any momentum going forward. Bradley would go on to withdraw at the end of the week after failing to win a single contest.

== Procedure ==
Vermont was one of 15 states and one territory holding primaries on Super Tuesday.

Voting took place throughout the state from 5:00 a.m. until 7:00 p.m., candidates had to meet a threshold of 15 percent in order to be considered viable. The 15 pledged delegates to the 2000 Democratic National Convention were allocated proportionally on the basis of the results of the primary. Of these, 10 were formally allocated as district delegates on the basis of the statewide result (by definition coterminous with the state's sole congressional district) and another 2 were allocated to party leaders and elected officials (PLEO delegates), in addition to 3 at-large delegates, both also according to the statewide result.

After town caucuses on April 21, 2020 designated delegates for the state convention, the state convention was held on May 30, 2020 to nominate national convention district delegates, who in turn elected the 3 at-large and 2 pledged PLEO delegates for the Democratic National Convention at the national convention delegate meeting on June 13, 2020. The delegation also included 8 unpledged PLEO delegates: 4 members of the Democratic National Committee, 1 member from Congress (Senator Patrick Leahy), the governor Howard Dean, and 1 add-on.

== Candidates ==
The following candidates appeared on the ballot:

- Al Gore
- Bill Bradley
- Lyndon LaRouche, Jr.

== Polling ==
Poll source	Date(s)	Sample size	Margin of error	Al Gore (D)	Bill Bradley (D)	Other / undecided (Note: Calculated by taking the difference of 100% and all other candidates combined.)
Brown University	February 26, 2000	321	—	56%	35%	9%
Mason-Dixon Polling & Strategy	February 26, 2000	321	—	56%	35%	9%
	February 1, 2000	Gore wins the New Hampshire primary				
	January 24, 2000	Gore wins the Iowa caucuses				

== Results ==
2000 Vermont Democratic presidential primary
Candidate	Votes	%	Delegates
Al Gore	26,774	54.33	9
Bill Bradley	21,629	43.89	6
Write-in votes	525	1.07	
Lyndon LaRouche, Jr.	355	0.72	
Uncommitted	-	-	7
Total	49,283	100%	22
