= 2000 Hawaii Democratic presidential caucuses =

- March 7, 2000

33 delegates to the Democratic National Convention

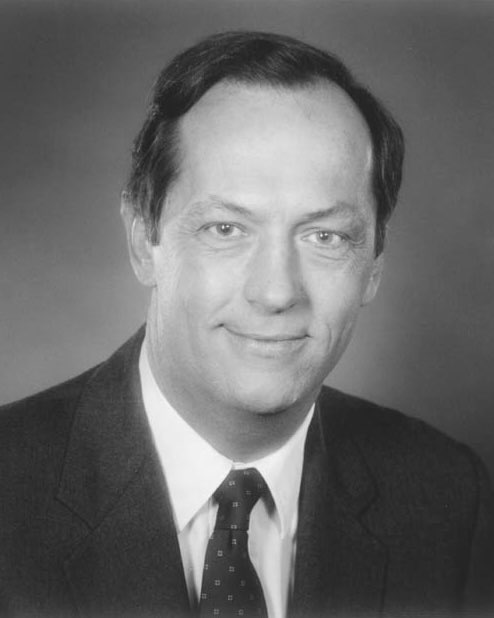

| Candidate | Al Gore | Bill Bradley | Uncommitted (voting option) |
| Home state | Tennessee | New Jersey |
| Delegate count | 20 | 2 | 11 |
| Percentage | 61% | 6% | 33% |

The 2000 Hawaii Democratic presidential caucuses were held on March 7, 2000, as part of the 2000 Democratic Party primaries for the 2000 presidential election. 33 delegates to the 2000 Democratic National Convention were allocated to the presidential candidates, the contest was held on Super Tuesday alongside primaries and caucuses in 15 other states.

Vice President AI Gore won the contest easily by taking all delegates.

== Candidates ==
The following candidates were on the ballot:

- Al Gore
- Bill Bradley
- Uncommitted (voting option)

== Results ==
Hawaii Democratic caucus, March 7, 2000
| Candidate | Votes | Percentage | Actual delegate count | | |
| Candidate | Votes | Percentage | Bound | Unbound | Total |
|---|---|---|---|---|---|
| AI Gore | | | 20 | | 20 |
| Uncommitted (voting option) | | | 11 | | 11 |
| Bill Bradley | | | 2 | | 2 |
| Total: | | | 33 | | 33 |

== See also ==
- 2000 United States presidential election in Hawaii
- 2000 United States presidential election
- 2000 Democratic Party presidential primaries
