= 2000 North Dakota Democratic presidential caucuses =

- March 7, 2000

22 delegates to the Democratic National Convention

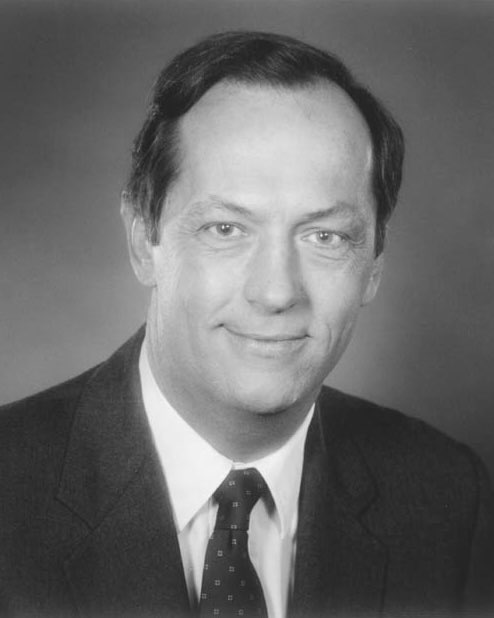
| Candidate | Al Gore | Bill Bradley |
| Home state | Tennessee | New Jersey |
| Delegate count | 22 |
| Popular vote | 1,711 | 477 |
| Percentage | 78% | 22% |

The 2000 North Dakota Democratic presidential caucuses were held on March 7, 2000, as part of the 2000 Democratic Party primaries for the 2000 presidential election. 14 delegates to the 2000 Democratic National Convention were allocated to the presidential candidates, the contest was held on Super Tuesday alongside primaries and caucuses in 15 other states. Vice President Al Gore won the contest by taking all the delegates.

== Candidates ==
The following candidates achieved on the ballot:

- Al Gore
- Uncommitted (voting option)
- Bill Bradley

== Results ==
North Dakota Democratic caucus, March 7, 2000
| Candidate | Votes | Percentage | Actual delegate count | | |
| Candidate | Votes | Percentage | Bound | Unbound | Total |
|---|---|---|---|---|---|
| Al Gore | 1,711 | 78% | 22 | | 22 |
| Bill Bradley | 477 | 22% | | | |
| Uncommitted (voting option) | | | | | |
| Total: | | | 22 | | 22 |

== See also ==
- 2000 United States presidential election in North Dakota
- 2000 United States presidential election
- 2000 Democratic Party presidential primaries
