= 2000 United States presidential election in New York =

- November 7, 2000
- Turnout: 60.7%

| Nominee | Al Gore | George W. Bush |
| Party | Democratic | Republican |
| Alliance | Parties: Liberal; Working Families | Conservative |
| Home state | Tennessee | Texas |
| Running mate | Joe Lieberman | Dick Cheney |
| Electoral vote | 33 | 0 |
| Popular vote | 4,113,791 | 2,405,676 |
| Percentage | 60.22% | 35.22% |

Gore
40–50%
50–60%
60–70%
70–80%
80–90%
Bush
40–50%
50–60%
60–70%
70–80%
80–90%
Tie
President before election
Bill Clinton
Democratic
Elected President
George W. Bush
Republican

The 2000 United States presidential election in New York took place on November 7, 2000, as part of the 2000 United States presidential election. Voters chose 33 representatives, or electors, to the Electoral College, who voted for president and vice president.

New York was won by incumbent Democratic Vice President Al Gore in a landslide victory; he received 60.22% of the vote to Republican George W. Bush's 35.22%, a Democratic victory margin of 25.00%. This marked the first time since 1964 that a Democratic presidential candidate won more than 60% of the vote in New York State, and only the second time in history, solidifying New York's status as a solid blue state in the 21st century. New York weighed in as about 25% more Democratic than the national average in the 2000 election.

This marks the last time that a Republican won the White House without carrying Richmond County (Staten Island).

== Primary elections ==
=== Democratic primary ===
The Democrats held their primary on March 7. There were 294 delegates at stake, with 243 pledged and 51 unpledged. Vice President Al Gore won 158 pledged and the support of 44 unpledged while U.S. Senator Bill Bradley won 85 pledged and the support of 1 unpledged.

=== Republican primary ===
The Republican primary was held on March 7. There were 101 delegates at stake, with 93 district delegates being decided in the primary and eight statewide delegates being decided at the state committee meeting in May. Texas Governor George W. Bush won 67 district delegates while U.S. Senator John McCain won 26 district delegates. The eight statewide delegates were unbound.

== General election ==
=== Polling ===
| Poll source | Date(s) | Sample size | Margin of error | George W. Bush (R) | Al Gore (D) | Ralph Nader (G) | Other / undecided (Note: Calculated by taking the difference of 100% and all other listed candidates combined. For polls that do not report a figure for Nader, this includes his support.) |
|---|---|---|---|---|---|---|---|
| Zogby Analytics | November 5, 2000 | 689 | | 37% | 56% | 6% | 1% |
| Marist College | November 4, 2000 | 580 | — | 37% | 55% | 4% | 4% |
| Rasmussen Reports | November 4, 2000 | 680 | — | 36% | 50% | — | 14% |
| Harris Insights & Analytics | November 3, 2000 | 13,590 | — | 38% | 53% | 6% | 3% |
| Quinnipiac University Polling Institute | November 3, 2000 | 979 | — | 34% | 55% | 6% | 5% |
| Blum & Weprin Associates | November 2, 2000 | 851 | — | 33% | 53% | 5% | 9% |
| Zogby Analytics | November 2, 2000 | 700 | — | 38% | 52% | 7% | 3% |
| Blum & Weprin Associates | November 1, 2000 | 883 | — | 31% | 55% | 3% | 11% |
| SurveyUSA | November 1, 2000 | 500 | — | 36% | 55% | — | 9% |
| Marist College | October 30, 2000 | 516 | — | 36% | 50% | 4% | 10% |
| Princeton Survey Research Associates International | October 30, 2000 | 844 | — | 38% | 51% | 6% | 5% |
| Zogby Analytics | October 30, 2000 | 700 | — | 36% | 51% | 5% | 8% |
| CBS News/The New York Times | October 27, 2000 | 871 | — | 35% | 55% | 7% | 3% |
| Quinnipiac University Polling Institute | October 27, 2000 | 600 (Note: Sample size unavailable; 600 is a default estimate used in the source dataset.) | — | 33% | 54% | 5% | 8% |
| Zogby Analytics | October 27, 2000 | 700 | — | 36% | 50% | 7% | 7% |
| Blum & Weprin Associates | October 24, 2000 | 844 | — | 31% | 55% | 4% | 10% |
| SurveyUSA | October 24, 2000 | 500 | — | 39% | 54% | — | 7% |
| Rasmussen Reports | October 22, 2000 | 781 | — | 37% | 48% | — | 15% |
| Quinnipiac University Polling Institute | September 28, 2000 | — | — | 34% | 54% | 6% | 6% |
| Quinnipiac University Polling Institute | September 13, 2000 | — | — | 29% | 56% | 6% | 9% |
| Quinnipiac University Polling Institute | August 10, 2000 | — | — | 38% | 42% | 6% | 14% |
| Quinnipiac University Polling Institute | July 13, 2000 | — | — | 35% | 45% | 7% | 13% |
| Quinnipiac University Polling Institute | May 2, 2000 | — | — | 34% | 50% | — | 16% |
| Quinnipiac University Polling Institute | April 6, 2000 | — | — | 34% | 52% | — | 14% |
| Quinnipiac University Polling Institute | March 1, 2000 | — | — | 36% | 53% | — | 11% |
| Quinnipiac University Polling Institute | February 10, 2000 | — | — | 37% | 53% | — | 10% |
| Quinnipiac University Polling Institute | January 19, 2000 | — | — | 39% | 47% | — | 12% |
| Quinnipiac University Polling Institute | December 14, 1999 | — | — | 39% | 47% | — | 12% |
| Quinnipiac University Polling Institute | November 11, 1999 | — | — | 43% | 47% | — | 10% |
| Quinnipiac University Polling Institute | October 3, 1999 | — | — | 41% | 43% | — | 16% |
| Quinnipiac University Polling Institute | September 15, 1999 | — | — | 43% | 46% | — | 11% |
| Quinnipiac University Polling Institute | August 2, 1999 | — | — | 43% | 45% | — | 12% |
| Quinnipiac University Polling Institute | July 1, 1999 | — | — | 45% | 44% | — | 11% |
| Quinnipiac University Polling Institute | March 24, 1999 | — | — | 42% | 47% | — | 11% |
| Quinnipiac University Polling Institute | February 24, 1999 | — | — | 40% | 49% | — | 11% |

Hypothetical polling

with Bill Bradley

| Poll source | Date(s) | Bill Bradley (D) | George W. Bush (R) | Elizabeth Dole (R) | John McCain (R) | Pat Buchanan (Rf) | Ralph Nader (R) |
|---|---|---|---|---|---|---|---|
| Quinnipiac University Polling Institute | February 24, 1999 | 41% | 38% | — | — | — | — |
| Quinnipiac University Polling Institute | February 24, 1999 | 46% | — | 34% | — | — | — |
| Quinnipiac University Polling Institute | March 24, 1999 | 47% | 42% | — | — | — | — |
| Quinnipiac University Polling Institute | March 24, 1999 | 47% | — | 35% | — | — | — |
| Quinnipiac University Polling Institute | July 1, 1999 | 44% | 45% | — | — | — | — |
| Quinnipiac University Polling Institute | July 1, 1999 | 50% | | 35% | — | — | — |
| Quinnipiac University Polling Institute | August 2, 1999 | 45% | 43% | — | — | — | — |
| Quinnipiac University Polling Institute | September 15, 1999 | 46% | 43% | — | — | — | — |
| Quinnipiac University Polling Institute | October 3, 1999 | 43% | 41% | — | — | — | — |
| Quinnipiac University Polling Institute | November 11, 1999 | 47% | 43% | — | — | — | — |
| | | 55% | | — | 23% | — | — |
| Quinnipiac University Polling Institute | December 14, 1999 | 47% | 39% | — | | — | — |
| | | 48% | | — | 29% | — | — |
| Quinnipiac University Polling Institute | January 19, 2000 | 47% | 39% | — | | — | — |
| | | 49% | | — | 29% | — | — |
| Quinnipiac University Polling Institute | February 10, 2000 | 53% | 37% | — | | — | — |
| | | 43% | | — | 40% | — | — |
| Quinnipiac University Polling Institute | March 1, 2000 | 53% | 36% | — | | — | — |
| | | 39% | | — | 44% | — | — |
| Quinnipiac University Polling Institute | April 6, 2000 | 52% | 34% | — | | 4% | — |
| Quinnipiac University Polling Institute | May 2, 2000 | 50% | 34% | — | — | 4% | — |
| Quinnipiac University Polling Institute | July 13, 2000 | 45% | 35% | — | — | 2% | 7% |
| Quinnipiac University Polling Institute | August 10, 2000 | 42% | 38% | — | — | 1% | 6% |
| Quinnipiac University Polling Institute | September 13, 2000 | 56% | 29% | — | — | 2% | 6% |
| Quinnipiac University Polling Institute | September 28, 2000 | 54% | 34% | — | — | 1% | 6% |
| Quinnipiac University Polling Institute | November 6, 2000 | 55% | 34% | — | — | 1% | 6% |

with Al Gore

| Poll source | Date(s) | Al Gore (D) | Elizabeth Dole (R) | John McCain (R) |
|---|---|---|---|---|
| Quinnipiac University Polling Institute | February 24, 1999 | 50% | 37% | — |
| Quinnipiac University Polling Institute | March 24, 1999 | 49% | 38% | — |
| Quinnipiac University Polling Institute | July 1, 1999 | 50% | 37% | — |
| Quinnipiac University Polling Institute | November 11, 1999 | 49% | — | 35% |
| Quinnipiac University Polling Institute | December 14, 1999 | 45% | — | 39% |
| Quinnipiac University Polling Institute | January 19, 2000 | 47% | — | 38% |
| Quinnipiac University Polling Institute | February 10, 2000 | 46% | — | 42% |
| Quinnipiac University Polling Institute | March 1, 2000 | 44% | — | 43% |

=== Results ===
2000 United States presidential election in New York
| Party | Candidate | Popular votes | Percentage | Electoral votes |
|---|---|---|---|---|
| Democratic | Al Gore | 3,942,215 | 57.78% | |
| Working Families | Al Gore | 88,395 | 1.30% | |
| Liberal | Al Gore | 77,087 | 1.13% | |
| Total | Albert A. Gore Jr. | 4,113,791 | 60.22% | 33 |
| Republican | George W. Bush | 2,258,577 | 33.10% | |
| Conservative | George W. Bush | 144,797 | 2.12% | |
| Total | George W. Bush | 2,405,676 | 35.22% | 0 |
| Green | Ralph Nader | 244,398 | 3.58% | 0 |
| Right to Life | Pat Buchanan | 25,175 | 0.37% | |
| Reform | Pat Buchanan | 6,424 | 0.09% | |
| Total | Pat Buchanan | 31,659 | 0.46% | 0 |
| Independence (a) | John Hagelin | 24,369 | 0.36% | 0 |
| Libertarian | Harry Browne | 7,718 | 0.11% | 0 |
| Constitution | Howard Phillips | 1,503 | 0.02% | 0 |
| Socialist Workers | James Harris | 1,450 | 0.02% | 0 |
| Others | - | 614 | 0.01% | 0 |
| - | Totals | 6,831,178 | 100.00% | 33 |
| Voter turnout (Registered) | | | | 60.70% |

(a) John Hagelin was then nominee of the Natural Law Party nationally.

==== New York City results ====
| 2000 presidential election in New York City | | Manhattan | The Bronx | Brooklyn | Queens | Staten Island | Total | |
| Democratic- Working Families- Liberal | Al Gore | 454,523 | 265,801 | 497,513 | 416,967 | 73,828 | 1,708,632 | 77.86% |
| Democratic- Working Families- Liberal | Al Gore | 79.60% | 86.28% | 80.60% | 75.00% | 51.94% | 1,708,632 | 77.86% |
| Republican- Conservative | George W. Bush | 82,113 | 36,245 | 96,609 | 122,052 | 63,903 | 400,922 | 18.27% |
| Republican- Conservative | George W. Bush | 14.38% | 11.77% | 15.65% | 21.95% | 44.96% | 400,922 | 18.27% |
| Green | Ralph Nader | 30,923 | 4,265 | 19,977 | 13,720 | 3,550 | 72,435 | 3.30% |
| Green | Ralph Nader | 5.49% | 1.38% | 3.24% | 2.47% | 2.50% | 72,435 | 3.30% |
| Right to Life- Reform | Pat Buchanan | 996 | 921 | 1,457 | 1,889 | 553 | 5,816 | 0.27% |
| Right to Life- Reform | Pat Buchanan | 0.18% | 0.30% | 0.24% | 0.34% | 0.39% | 5,816 | 0.27% |
| Independence | John Hagelin | 855 | 536 | 895 | 721 | 154 | 3,161 | 0.14% |
| Independence | John Hagelin | 0.15% | 0.17% | 0.15% | 0.13% | 0.11% | 3,161 | 0.14% |
| Libertarian | Harry Browne | 990 | 117 | 419 | 385 | 96 | 2,007 | 0.09% |
| Libertarian | Harry Browne | 0.18% | 0.04% | 0.07% | 0.07% | 0.07% | 2,007 | 0.09% |
| Socialist Workers | James Harris | 173 | 109 | 145 | 109 | 20 | 556 | 0.03% |
| Socialist Workers | James Harris | 0.03% | 0.04% | 0.02% | 0.02% | 0.01% | 556 | 0.03% |
| Constitution | Howard Phillips | 74 | 54 | 139 | 87 | 17 | 371 | 0.02% |
| Constitution | Howard Phillips | 0.01% | 0.02% | 0.02% | 0.02% | 0.01% | 371 | 0.02% |
| Total | | 571,006 | 308,063 | 617,237 | 555,991 | 142,129 | 2,194,426 | 100.00% |

==== By county ====
| County | Al Gore Democratic | | George W. Bush Republican | | Ralph Nader Green | | Various candidates Other parties | | Margin | | Total votes cast |
| County | # | % | # | % | # | % | # | % | # | % | Total votes cast |
|---|---|---|---|---|---|---|---|---|---|---|---|
| Albany | 85,644 | 60.30% | 47,624 | 33.53% | 7,182 | 5.06% | 1,583 | 1.11% | 38,020 | 26.77% | 142,033 |
| Allegany | 6,336 | 33.90% | 11,436 | 61.19% | 657 | 3.52% | 261 | 1.40% | -5,100 | -27.29% | 18,690 |
| Bronx | 265,801 | 86.28% | 36,245 | 11.77% | 4,265 | 1.38% | 1,752 | 0.57% | 229,556 | 74.51% | 308,063 |
| Broome | 45,381 | 52.11% | 36,946 | 42.43% | 3,826 | 4.39% | 921 | 1.06% | 8,435 | 9.68% | 87,074 |
| Cattaraugus | 13,816 | 40.96% | 18,382 | 54.49% | 1,094 | 3.24% | 441 | 1.31% | -4,566 | -13.53% | 33,733 |
| Cayuga | 17,031 | 50.12% | 14,988 | 44.11% | 1,448 | 4.26% | 511 | 1.50% | 2,043 | 6.01% | 33,978 |
| Chautauqua | 27,016 | 46.01% | 29,064 | 49.49% | 1,888 | 3.22% | 754 | 1.28% | -2,048 | -3.48% | 58,722 |
| Chemung | 17,424 | 46.21% | 18,779 | 49.80% | 1,195 | 3.17% | 312 | 0.83% | -1,355 | -3.59% | 37,710 |
| Chenango | 9,112 | 45.00% | 10,033 | 49.55% | 869 | 4.29% | 236 | 1.17% | -921 | -4.55% | 20,250 |
| Clinton | 15,542 | 50.86% | 13,274 | 43.44% | 1,205 | 3.94% | 538 | 1.76% | 2,268 | 7.42% | 30,559 |
| Columbia | 13,489 | 47.00% | 13,153 | 45.83% | 1,707 | 5.95% | 349 | 1.22% | 336 | 1.17% | 28,698 |
| Cortland | 9,691 | 46.76% | 9,857 | 47.56% | 943 | 4.55% | 235 | 1.13% | -166 | -0.80% | 20,726 |
| Delaware | 8,450 | 41.88% | 10,662 | 52.84% | 833 | 4.13% | 231 | 1.14% | -2,212 | -10.96% | 20,176 |
| Dutchess | 52,390 | 46.87% | 52,669 | 47.12% | 5,553 | 4.97% | 1,159 | 1.04% | -279 | -0.25% | 111,771 |
| Erie | 240,176 | 56.56% | 160,176 | 37.72% | 18,166 | 4.28% | 6,136 | 1.44% | 80,000 | 18.84% | 424,654 |
| Essex | 7,927 | 44.19% | 8,822 | 49.18% | 848 | 4.73% | 341 | 1.90% | -895 | -4.99% | 17,938 |
| Franklin | 8,870 | 50.83% | 7,643 | 43.80% | 658 | 3.77% | 280 | 1.60% | 1,227 | 7.03% | 17,451 |
| Fulton | 9,314 | 42.97% | 11,434 | 52.75% | 668 | 3.08% | 259 | 1.19% | -2,120 | -9.78% | 21,675 |
| Genesee | 10,191 | 39.08% | 14,459 | 55.45% | 924 | 3.54% | 500 | 1.92% | -4,268 | -16.37% | 26,074 |
| Greene | 8,480 | 40.20% | 11,332 | 53.72% | 924 | 4.38% | 359 | 1.70% | -2,852 | -13.52% | 21,095 |
| Hamilton | 1,114 | 30.26% | 2,388 | 64.86% | 133 | 3.61% | 47 | 1.28% | -1,274 | -34.60% | 3,682 |
| Herkimer | 12,224 | 44.12% | 14,147 | 51.06% | 969 | 3.50% | 365 | 1.32% | -1,923 | -6.94% | 27,705 |
| Jefferson | 16,799 | 46.12% | 18,192 | 49.95% | 1,029 | 2.83% | 403 | 1.11% | -1,393 | -3.83% | 36,423 |
| Kings | 497,513 | 80.60% | 96,609 | 15.65% | 19,977 | 3.24% | 3,138 | 0.51% | 400,904 | 64.95% | 617,237 |
| Lewis | 4,333 | 39.64% | 6,103 | 55.83% | 324 | 2.96% | 172 | 1.57% | -1,770 | -16.19% | 10,932 |
| Livingston | 10,476 | 38.48% | 15,244 | 56.00% | 1,053 | 3.87% | 450 | 1.65% | -4,768 | -17.52% | 27,223 |
| Madison | 12,017 | 42.36% | 14,879 | 52.45% | 1,092 | 3.85% | 378 | 1.33% | -2,862 | -10.09% | 28,366 |
| Monroe | 161,743 | 50.89% | 141,266 | 44.45% | 11,520 | 3.62% | 3,296 | 1.04% | 20,477 | 6.44% | 317,825 |
| Montgomery | 10,249 | 49.25% | 9,765 | 46.93% | 487 | 2.34% | 308 | 1.48% | 484 | 2.32% | 20,809 |
| Nassau | 342,226 | 57.96% | 227,060 | 38.46% | 14,780 | 2.50% | 6,373 | 1.08% | 115,166 | 19.50% | 590,439 |
| New York | 454,523 | 79.60% | 82,113 | 14.38% | 30,923 | 5.42% | 3,447 | 0.60% | 372,410 | 65.22% | 571,006 |
| Niagara | 47,781 | 51.23% | 40,952 | 43.91% | 3,257 | 3.49% | 1,280 | 1.37% | 6,829 | 7.32% | 93,270 |
| Oneida | 43,933 | 45.76% | 47,603 | 49.58% | 3,160 | 3.29% | 1,314 | 1.37% | -3,670 | -3.82% | 96,010 |
| Onondaga | 109,896 | 53.97% | 83,678 | 41.09% | 7,670 | 3.77% | 2,399 | 1.18% | 26,218 | 12.88% | 203,643 |
| Ontario | 19,761 | 43.01% | 23,885 | 51.98% | 1,793 | 3.90% | 510 | 1.11% | -4,124 | -8.97% | 45,949 |
| Orange | 58,170 | 45.96% | 62,852 | 49.66% | 4,192 | 3.31% | 1,343 | 1.06% | -4,682 | -3.70% | 126,557 |
| Orleans | 5,991 | 37.81% | 9,202 | 58.08% | 474 | 2.99% | 177 | 1.12% | -3,211 | -20.27% | 15,844 |
| Oswego | 22,857 | 47.15% | 23,249 | 47.96% | 1,699 | 3.50% | 674 | 1.39% | -392 | -0.81% | 48,479 |
| Otsego | 11,460 | 45.19% | 12,219 | 48.19% | 1,419 | 5.60% | 260 | 1.03% | -759 | -3.00% | 25,358 |
| Putnam | 18,525 | 43.53% | 21,853 | 51.35% | 1,730 | 4.07% | 446 | 1.05% | -3,328 | -7.82% | 42,554 |
| Queens | 416,967 | 75.00% | 122,052 | 21.95% | 13,720 | 2.47% | 3,252 | 0.58% | 294,915 | 53.05% | 555,991 |
| Rensselaer | 34,808 | 50.86% | 29,562 | 43.20% | 3,291 | 4.81% | 775 | 1.13% | 5,246 | 7.66% | 68,436 |
| Richmond | 73,828 | 51.94% | 63,903 | 44.96% | 3,550 | 2.50% | 848 | 0.60% | 9,925 | 6.98% | 142,129 |
| Rockland | 69,530 | 56.72% | 48,441 | 39.51% | 3,502 | 2.86% | 1,117 | 0.91% | 21,089 | 17.21% | 122,590 |
| Saratoga | 43,359 | 45.61% | 46,623 | 49.05% | 4,149 | 4.36% | 926 | 0.97% | -3,264 | -3.44% | 95,057 |
| Schenectady | 35,534 | 53.07% | 27,961 | 41.76% | 2,750 | 4.11% | 709 | 1.06% | 7,573 | 11.31% | 66,954 |
| Schoharie | 5,390 | 39.77% | 7,459 | 55.03% | 551 | 4.07% | 154 | 1.14% | -2,069 | -15.26% | 13,554 |
| Schuyler | 3,301 | 40.49% | 4,381 | 53.73% | 369 | 4.53% | 102 | 1.25% | -1,080 | -13.24% | 8,153 |
| Seneca | 6,841 | 47.71% | 6,734 | 46.97% | 560 | 3.91% | 203 | 1.42% | 107 | 0.74% | 14,338 |
| St. Lawrence | 21,386 | 53.75% | 16,449 | 41.34% | 1,488 | 3.74% | 463 | 1.16% | 4,937 | 12.41% | 39,786 |
| Steuben | 14,600 | 35.99% | 24,200 | 59.66% | 1,248 | 3.08% | 515 | 1.27% | -9,600 | -23.67% | 40,563 |
| Suffolk | 306,306 | 53.37% | 240,992 | 41.99% | 18,130 | 3.16% | 8,516 | 1.48% | 65,314 | 11.38% | 573,944 |
| Sullivan | 14,348 | 50.29% | 12,703 | 44.53% | 1,156 | 4.05% | 321 | 1.13% | 1,645 | 5.76% | 28,528 |
| Tioga | 9,170 | 40.83% | 12,239 | 54.50% | 846 | 3.77% | 202 | 0.90% | -3,069 | -13.67% | 22,457 |
| Tompkins | 21,807 | 54.44% | 13,351 | 33.33% | 4,548 | 11.35% | 354 | 0.88% | 8,456 | 21.11% | 40,060 |
| Ulster | 38,162 | 48.78% | 33,447 | 42.75% | 5,732 | 7.33% | 896 | 1.15% | 4,715 | 6.03% | 78,237 |
| Warren | 12,193 | 42.60% | 14,993 | 52.38% | 1,177 | 4.11% | 258 | 0.90% | -2,800 | -9.78% | 28,621 |
| Washington | 9,641 | 40.93% | 12,596 | 53.47% | 997 | 4.23% | 321 | 1.36% | -2,955 | -12.54% | 23,555 |
| Wayne | 14,977 | 39.07% | 21,701 | 56.62% | 1,202 | 3.14% | 449 | 1.17% | -6,724 | -17.55% | 38,329 |
| Westchester | 218,010 | 58.63% | 139,278 | 37.46% | 11,596 | 3.12% | 2,929 | 0.79% | 78,732 | 21.17% | 371,813 |
| Wyoming | 5,999 | 34.02% | 10,809 | 61.30% | 548 | 3.11% | 277 | 1.57% | -4,810 | -27.28% | 17,633 |
| Yates | 3,962 | 39.39% | 5,565 | 55.32% | 386 | 3.84% | 146 | 1.45% | -1,603 | -15.93% | 10,059 |
| Totals | 4,113,791 | 60.22% | 2,405,676 | 35.22% | 244,398 | 3.58% | 67,313 | 0.99% | 1,708,115 | 25.00% | 6,831,178 |

===== Counties that flipped from Democratic to Republican =====
- Cattaraugus (largest city: Olean)
- Chautauqua (largest city: Jamestown)
- Chemung (largest city: Elmira)
- Chenango (largest city: Norwich)
- Cortland (largest city: Cortland)
- Delaware (largest city: Sidney)
- Dutchess (largest city: Poughkeepsie)
- Essex (largest CDP: Ticonderoga)
- Fulton (largest city: Gloversville)
- Herkimer (largest city: German Flatts)
- Jefferson (largest city: Le Ray)
- Lewis (largest city: Lowville)
- Madison (largest city: Oneida)
- Oneida (largest city: Utica)
- Ontario (largest city: Geneva)
- Orange (largest city: Palm Tree)
- Oswego (largest city: Oswego)
- Otsego (largest city: Oneonta)
- Saratoga (largest city: Saratoga Springs)
- Schoharie (largest city: Cobleskill)
- Schuyler (largest city: Watkins Glen)
- Warren (largest city: Glens Falls)
- Washington (largest city: Hudson Falls)
- Yates (largest city: Penn Yan)

==== By congressional district ====
Gore won 27 of 31 congressional districts, including eight that elected Republicans.

| District | Gore | Bush | Representative |
|---|---|---|---|
| 1st | 52% | 43% | Michael Forbes |
| 1st | 52% | 43% | Felix Grucci |
| 2nd | 56% | 40% | Rick Lazio |
| 2nd | 56% | 40% | Steve Israel |
| 3rd | 55% | 41% | Peter T. King |
| 4th | 59% | 38% | Carolyn McCarthy |
| 5th | 62% | 35% | Gary Ackerman |
| 6th | 88% | 11% | Gregory W. Meeks |
| 7th | 71% | 25% | Joseph Crowley |
| 8th | 77% | 17% | Jerrold Nadler |
| 9th | 67% | 29% | Anthony D. Weiner |
| 10th | 90% | 7% | Edolphus Towns |
| 11th | 89% | 7% | Major Owens |
| 12th | 81% | 13% | Nydia Velasquez |
| 13th | 53% | 44% | Vito Fossella |
| 14th | 71% | 23% | Carolyn B. Maloney |
| 15th | 90% | 6% | Charlie Rangel |
| 16th | 93% | 6% | Jose Serrano |
| 17th | 87% | 11% | Eliot L. Engel |
| 18th | 60% | 37% | Nita Lowey |
| 19th | 50% | 45% | Sue W. Kelly |
| 20th | 54% | 42% | Benjamin Gilman |
| 21st | 57% | 37% | Michael R. McNulty |
| 22nd | 44% | 50% | John E. Sweeney |
| 23rd | 45% | 50% | Sherwood Boehlert |
| 24th | 48% | 47% | John M. McHugh |
| 25th | 53% | 42% | James T. Walsh |
| 26th | 51% | 42% | Maurice Hinchey |
| 27th | 42% | 53% | Thomas M. Reynolds |
| 28th | 53% | 42% | Louise Slaughter |
| 29th | 52% | 43% | John J. LaFalce |
| 30th | 59% | 35% | Jack Quinn |
| 31st | 42% | 53% | Amo Houghton |

== Analysis ==
As of the 2024 presidential election, this is the last election in which the Democratic candidate won Montgomery County. This is the second consecutive election that a Democrat won every borough of New York City, which has occurred once since, in 2012.

Bush became the first Republican to win the White House without carrying Onondaga, Cayuga, St. Lawrence, Broome, Monroe, or Nassau counties since these counties' founding in 1794, 1799, 1802, 1806, 1821, and 1899, respectively, the first to do so without carrying Clinton, Franklin, Rensselear, or Richmond counties, or any borough of New York City since Herbert Hoover in 1928, the first to do so without carrying Rockland, Seneca or Westchester counties since Benjamin Harrison in 1888, the first to do so without carrying Sullivan County since James A. Garfield in 1880, and the first to do so without carrying Columbia, Suffolk, or Ulster counties since Rutherford Hayes in 1876.

Gore won an overwhelming landslide in fiercely Democratic New York City, taking 1,703,364 votes to George W. Bush's 398,726, a 77.90% - 18.23% victory. Gore carried all five boroughs of New York City. Excluding New York City's votes, Gore still would have carried New York State, but by a smaller margin, receiving 2,404,543 votes to Bush's 2,004,648, giving Gore a 54.53% - 45.47% win.

== Electors ==
Technically the voters of New York cast their ballots for electors: representatives to the Electoral College. New York is allocated 33 electors because it has 31 congressional districts and two senators. All candidates who appear on the ballot or qualify to receive write-in votes must submit a list of 33 electors, who pledge to vote for their candidate and his or her running mate. Whoever wins the majority of votes in the state is awarded all 33 electoral votes. Their chosen electors then vote for president and vice president. Although electors are pledged to their candidate and running mate, they are not obligated to vote for them. An elector who votes for someone other than his or her candidate is known as a faithless elector.

The electors of each state and the District of Columbia met on December 18, 2000 to cast their votes for president and vice president. The Electoral College itself never meets as one body. Instead, the electors from each state and the District of Columbia met in their respective capitols.

The following were the members of the Electoral College from the state. All were pledged to and voted for Gore and Lieberman:

1. Susan I. Abramowitz
2. Leslie Alpert
3. Martin S. Begun
4. David L. Cohen
5. Carolee A. Conklin
6. Martin Connor
7. Lorraine Cortez Vasquez
8. Inez E. Dickens
9. Cynthia Emmer
10. Herman D. Farrell Jr.
11. Emily Giske
12. Patrick G. Halpin
13. Raymond B. Harding
14. Judith Hope
15. Denis M. Hughes
16. Virginia Kee
17. Bertha Lewis
18. Alberta Madonna
19. Thomas J. Manton
20. Deborah Marciano
21. Helen Marshall
22. Carl McCall
23. Elizabeth F. Momrow
24. Clarence Norman Jr.
25. Daniel F. Donohue
26. Shirley O'Connell
27. G. Steven Pigeon
28. Roberto Ramirez
29. Michael Schell
30. Sheldon Silver
31. Andrew Spano
32. Eliot Spitzer
33. Randi Weingarten

== See also ==
- United States presidential elections in New York
- Presidency of George W. Bush
