= 2000 Georgia Democratic presidential primary =

- March 7, 2000

93 delegates to the Democratic National Convention (77 pledged, 16 unpledged) The number of pledged delegates received is determined by the popular vote

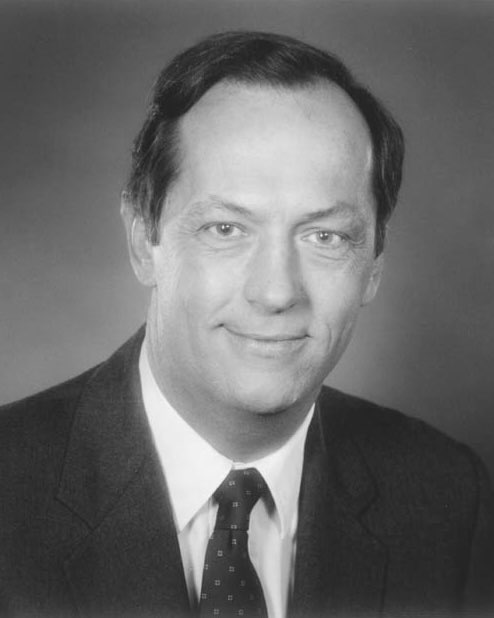
Candidate	Al Gore	Bill Bradley
Home state	Tennessee	New Jersey
Delegate count	65	12
Popular vote	238,396	46,035
Percentage	83.82%	16.18%
- Primary results by county Gore: 60–70% 70–80% 80–90% 90–100%

Pledged national convention delegates
Type	Del.	Type	Del.
CD1	4	CD7	4
CD2	4	CD8	4
CD3	4	CD9	4
CD4	6	CD10	5
CD5	6	CD11	4
CD6	5	CD11	4
PLEO	10	At-large	17
Total pledged delegates			77

The 2000 Georgia Democratic presidential primary was held on March 7, 2000, as one of 16 contests scheduled on Super Tuesday in the Democratic Party primaries for the 2000 presidential election. The Georgia primary was an open primary, which awarded 93 delegates to the 2000 Democratic National Convention, of whom 77 were pledged delegates allocated on the basis of the primary results.

Vice president Al Gore won the primary and 65 delegates with almost 84% of the vote, while senator Bill Bradley only received a little more than 16% and only 12 delegates. Lyndon LaRouche Jr. failed to gain ballot access in Georgia, making this one of the few contests he was not on the ballot for.

== Procedure ==
Georgia was one of 15 states and one territory holding primaries on March 7, 2000, also known as "Super Tuesday".

Voting was expected to take place throughout the state from 7:00 a.m. until 7:00 p.m. In the open primary, candidates had to meet a threshold of 15 percent at the congressional district or statewide level in order to be considered viable. The 77 pledged delegates to the 2000 Democratic National Convention were allocated proportionally on the basis of the results of the primary. Of these, between 4 and 6 were allocated to each of the state's 11 congressional districts and another 10 were allocated to party leaders and elected officials (PLEO delegates), in addition to 17 at-large delegates.

The state committee meeting was subsequently held and voted on the 17 at-large delegates for the Democratic National Convention. The delegation also included 13 unpledged PLEO delegates: 7 members of the Democratic National Committee, 4 members from Congress (1 Senator, (Note: On July 24, 2000, former Democratic Governor Zell Miller was appointed to fill the late Republican Paul Coverdell's Senate seat. Senator Zell Miller will attend the convention as an unpledged PLEO delegate. This change increased the size of the Georgia Delegation from 92 to 93 delegates.) Max Cleland, and 3 representatives, Sanford Bishop, Cynthia McKinney, and John Lewis), the governor Roy Barnes, 1 distinguished party leader, that being former president Jimmy Carter, and 2 add-ons.

== Candidates ==
The following candidates appeared on the ballot:

- Al Gore
- Bill Bradley

== Polling ==
Poll source	Date(s)	Sample size	Margin of error	Al Gore (D)	Bill Bradley (D)	Other / undecided (Note: Calculated by taking the difference of 100% and all other candidates combined.)
SurveyUSA	March 4, 2000	476	—	78%	19%	3%
Mason-Dixon Polling & Strategy	February 29, 2000	329	—	64%	27%	9%
	February 1, 2000	Gore wins the New Hampshire primary				
	January 24, 2000	Gore wins the Iowa caucuses				

== Results ==
2000 Georgia Democratic presidential primary
Candidate	Votes	%	Delegates
Al Gore	238,396	83.82	65
Bill Bradley	46,035	16.18	12
Unallocated	-	-	16
Total	284,431	100%	93
