= Bill Bradley 2000 presidential campaign =

American political campaign

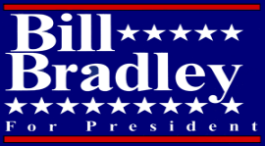
- Campaign: U.S. presidential election, 2000
- Candidate: Bill Bradley; U.S. Senator from New Jersey (1979–1997)
- Affiliation: Democratic Party
- Status: Withdrew: March 9, 2000
- Key people: Michael Jordan (endorsement), Phil Jackson (endorsement), Spike Lee (endorsement)

Website
- www.billbradley.com/ (archived – Mar. 2, 2000)

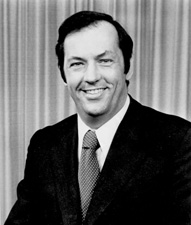
Bill Bradley

The 2000 presidential campaign of Bill Bradley, former Senator of New Jersey began when he formed an exploratory committee in December 1998, with a formal announcement in January 1999. He ran in the 2000 presidential primaries, opposing incumbent Vice President Al Gore for his party's nomination. Bradley campaigned as a progressive alternative to Gore, taking positions to the left of Gore on a number of issues, including police brutality, racial profiling, universal health care, gun control, and campaign finance reform.

== Political positions ==
On the issue of taxes, Bradley trumpeted his sponsorship of the Tax Reform Act of 1986, which had significantly cut tax rates while abolishing dozens of loopholes. He voiced his belief that the best possible tax code would be one with low rates and no loopholes, but he refused to rule out the idea of raising taxes to pay for his health care program.

On public education, Bradley reversed his previous support of school vouchers, declaring them a failure. He proposed to make over $2 billion in block grants available to each state every year for education. He further promised to bring 60,000 new teachers into the education system annually by offering college scholarships to anyone who agreed to become a teacher after graduating.

Bradley also made child poverty a significant issue in his campaign. Having voted against the Personal Responsibility and Work Opportunity Act, better known as the "Welfare Reform Act," which, he said, would result in even higher poverty levels, he promised to repeal it as president. He also promised to address the minimum wage, expand the Earned Income Tax Credit, allow single parents on welfare to keep their child support payments, make the Dependent Care Tax Credit refundable, build support homes for pregnant teenagers, enroll 400,000 more children in Head Start, and increase the availability of food stamps.

== Endorsements ==
Although Gore was considered the party favorite, Bradley did receive some high-profile endorsements. His first endorsement from a sitting member of Congress came from Minnesota Senator Paul Wellstone, who had considered a presidential run himself.

Outgoing New York Senator Daniel Patrick Moynihan endorsed Bradley's campaign, opining that Gore would be unable to win the election. Former New York Governor Mario Cuomo criticized Moynihan's endorsement, calling it “surprisingly tepid” and claiming that the endorsement was motivated by the senator's conflicts with the Clinton administration (Cuomo had endorsed Gore).

== Decline ==
Bradley's campaign initially had strong prospects, due to high-profile endorsements and as his fundraising efforts gave him a deep war chest. Bradley was initially expected to fare well in the New Hampshire primary: some polls from within two weeks of that election showed him leading Gore by ten percentage points. However, Bradley's prospects in New Hampshire experienced a decline in the week leading up to that contest. Boston Globe political columnist Bob Hohler regarded Gore's sizable victory in the Iowa caucuses, seven days before New Hampshire's primary, as a transformative moment in the campaign. In addition, in the days leading up to the New Hampshire primary, questions were raised about his physical health.

In the New Hampshire primary, Bradley lost to Gore by six percentage points. Bradley stayed in the race until after Super Tuesday, but he never won a contest, and ultimately endorsed Gore.
