= 2000 New York Democratic presidential primary =

- March 7, 2000

294 delegates to the Democratic National Convention (243 pledged, 51 unpledged) The number of pledged delegates received is determined by the popular vote

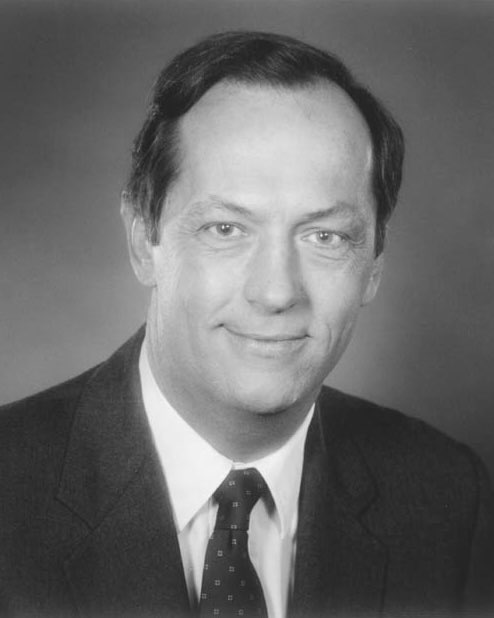
Candidate	Al Gore	Bill Bradley
Home state	Tennessee	New Jersey
Delegate count	158	85
Popular vote	639,417	326,038
Percentage	65.62%	33.46%
- County results Gore: 50–60% 60–70% 70–80%

The 2000 New York Democratic presidential primary took place on March 7, 2000, as one of 15 states and one territory holding primaries on the same day, known as Super Tuesday for the 2000 presidential election. The New York primary was a closed primary, with the state awarding 294 delegates to the 2000 Democratic National Convention, of whom 243 were pledged delegates allocated on the basis of the primary results.

Vice president and presumptive nominee Al Gore decided the primary with almost 66% of the vote, winning 158 delegates, while senator Bill Bradley caught a relevant amount of delegates one of the last times in the primary cycle, receiving 33% and 85 delegates, and one other candidate, Lyndon LaRouche Jr. earned less than 1%.

== Procedure ==
New York was one of 15 states and one territory holding primaries on Super Tuesday.

Voting took place throughout the state from 6:00 a.m. until 9:00 p.m. In the closed primary, candidates had to meet a threshold of 15 percent at the congressional district or statewide level in order to be considered viable. The 243 pledged delegates to the 2000 Democratic National Convention were allocated proportionally on the basis of the results of the primary. Of these, between 4 and 6 were allocated to each of the state's 31 congressional districts and another 32 were allocated to party leaders and elected officials (PLEO delegates), in addition to 53 at-large delegates.

The state Democratic committee met on May 31, 2000, to vote on the 53 at-large and 32 pledged PLEO delegates for the Democratic National Convention. The delegation also included 47 unpledged PLEO delegates: 26 members of the Democratic National Committee, 21 members of Congress (Both senators, Daniel Patrick Moynihan and Chuck Schumer, and 19 representatives, Carolyn McCarthy, Gary Ackerman, Gregory Meeks, Joseph Crowley, Jerrold Nadler, Anthony Weiner, Edolphus Towns, Major Owens, Nydia Velázquez, Carolyn Maloney, Charles Rangel, José Serrano, Eliot Engel, Nita Lowey, Michael McNulty, Maurice Hinchey, Louise Slaughter, and John LaFalce), and 4 add-ons.

Pledged national convention delegates
Type	Del.	Type	Del.	Type	Del.
CD1	6	CD12	7	CD23	6
CD2	6	CD13	6	CD24	7
CD3	7	CD14	8	CD25	6
CD4	7	CD15	8	CD26	6
CD5	8	CD16	6	CD27	6
CD6	6	CD17	7	CD28	7
CD7	7	CD18	8	CD29	7
CD8	8	CD19	7	CD30	7
CD9	8	CD20	6	CD31	6
CD10	8	CD21	6	PLEO	32
CD11	8	CD22	6	At-large	53
Total pledged delegates					243

== Candidates ==
The following candidates appeared on the ballot:

- Al Gore
- Bill Bradley
- Lyndon LaRouche Jr.

== Polling ==
Poll source	Date(s)	Sample size	Margin of error	Al Gore (D)	Bill Bradley (D)	Other / undecided (Note: Calculated by taking the difference of 100% and all other candidates combined.)
Marist College	March 6, 2000	461	—	58%	32%	10%
Zogby Analytics	March 4, 2000	338	—	58%	28%	14%
Mason-Dixon Polling & Strategy	March 3, 2000	428	—	57%	31%	12%
Quinnipiac University Polling Institute	March 3, 2000	282	—	60%	32%	8%
Blum & Weprin Associates	March 1, 2000	402	—	60%	25%	15%
Marist College	March 1, 2000	244	—	60%	28%	12%
Zogby Analytics	March 1, 2000	476	—	58%	26%	16%
Zogby Analytics	February 28, 2000	400	—	52%	33%	15%
CBS News/The New York Times	February 26, 2000	382	—	55%	29%	16%
Quinnipiac University Polling Institute	February 25, 2000	312	—	59%	33%	8%
Zogby Analytics	February 25, 2000	400	—	52%	35%	13%
Marist College	February 21, 2000	279	—	59%	33%	8%
Quinnipiac University Polling Institute	February 20, 2000	282	—	56%	32%	12%
CBS News/The New York Times	February 19, 2000	542	—	59%	28%	13%
	February 1, 2000	Gore wins the New Hampshire primary				
	October 16–18, 2000	Gore wins the Iowa caucuses				
Quinnipiac University Polling Institute	January 19, 2000	—	—	44%	39%	16%
Quinnipiac University Polling Institute	December 14, 1999	—	—	42%	39%	19%
Quinnipiac University Polling Institute	November 11, 1999	—	—	38%	47%	15%
Quinnipiac University Polling Institute	October 3, 1999	—	—	41%	44%	15%
Quinnipiac University Polling Institute	September 15, 1999	—	—	42%	40%	18%
Quinnipiac University Polling Institute	August 2, 1999	—	—	47%	38%	15%
Quinnipiac University Polling Institute	July 1, 1999	—	—	52%	34%	14%

== Results ==
2000 New York Democratic presidential primary
Candidate	Votes	%	Delegates
Al Gore	639,417	65.62	158
Bill Bradley	326,038	33.46	85
Lyndon LaRouche Jr.	9,008	0.92	
Uncommitted	-	-	51
Total	974,463	100%	294
