= 2000 U.S. Virgin Islands Democratic presidential caucuses =

- April 1, 2000

6 delegates to the Democratic National Convention

Candidate	Al Gore	Uncommitted (voting option)
Home state	Tennessee	n/a
Delegate count	3	3
Popular vote	748
Percentage	100.0%

The 2000 U.S. Virgin Islands Democratic presidential caucuses were held on April 1, 2000, as part of the Democratic Party primaries for the 2000 presidential election. 6 delegates to the Democratic National Convention will be allocated to presidential candidates.

Although the United States Virgin Islands will not participate in the 2000 presidential general election because it is a U.S. territory and not a state, it equally participated in the U.S. presidential caucuses and primaries.

== Candidates ==
The following candidates achieved on the ballot:

- Al Gore
- Uncommitted (voting option)

== Results ==
Virgin Islands Democratic caucus, April 1, 2000
Candidate	Votes	Percentage	Actual delegate count		
Candidate	Votes	Percentage	Bound	Unbound	Total
AI Gore	748	100.00%	3		3
Uncommitted (voting option)			3		3
Total:	748	100.00%	6		6

== See also ==
- 2000 Republican Party presidential primaries
- 2000 United States presidential election
- 2000 United States elections
