= 2000 Virginia Democratic presidential caucuses =

- April 15, 2000

79 delegates to the Democratic National Convention
Candidate	Al Gore
Home state	Tennessee
Delegate count	79
Percentage	100.0%

The 2000 Virginia Democratic presidential caucuses were held on April 15, 2000, as part of the 2000 presidential primaries for the 2000 presidential election. 79 delegates to the 2000 Democratic National Convention were allocated to the presidential candidates.

Former Vice President AI Gore won the contest unopposed and won all 79 delegates.

== Candidates ==
The following candidates achieved on the ballot:

- Al Gore
- Uncommitted (voting option)

== Results ==
There were only delegates applied, and no popular vote in the contest. But Al Gore won by taking all.

Virginia Democratic caucus, April 15, 2000
Candidate	Votes	Percentage	Actual delegate count		
Candidate	Votes	Percentage	Bound	Unbound	Total
Al Gore			79		79
Uncommitted (voting option)					
Total:			79		79

== See also ==
- 2000 United States presidential election in Virginia
- 2000 United States presidential election
- 2000 Democratic Party presidential primaries
- 2000 Republican Party presidential primaries
