= 2004 Wyoming Democratic presidential caucuses =

- February 3, 2004

13 Democratic National Convention delegates (13 pledged) The number of pledged delegates received is determined by the popular vote
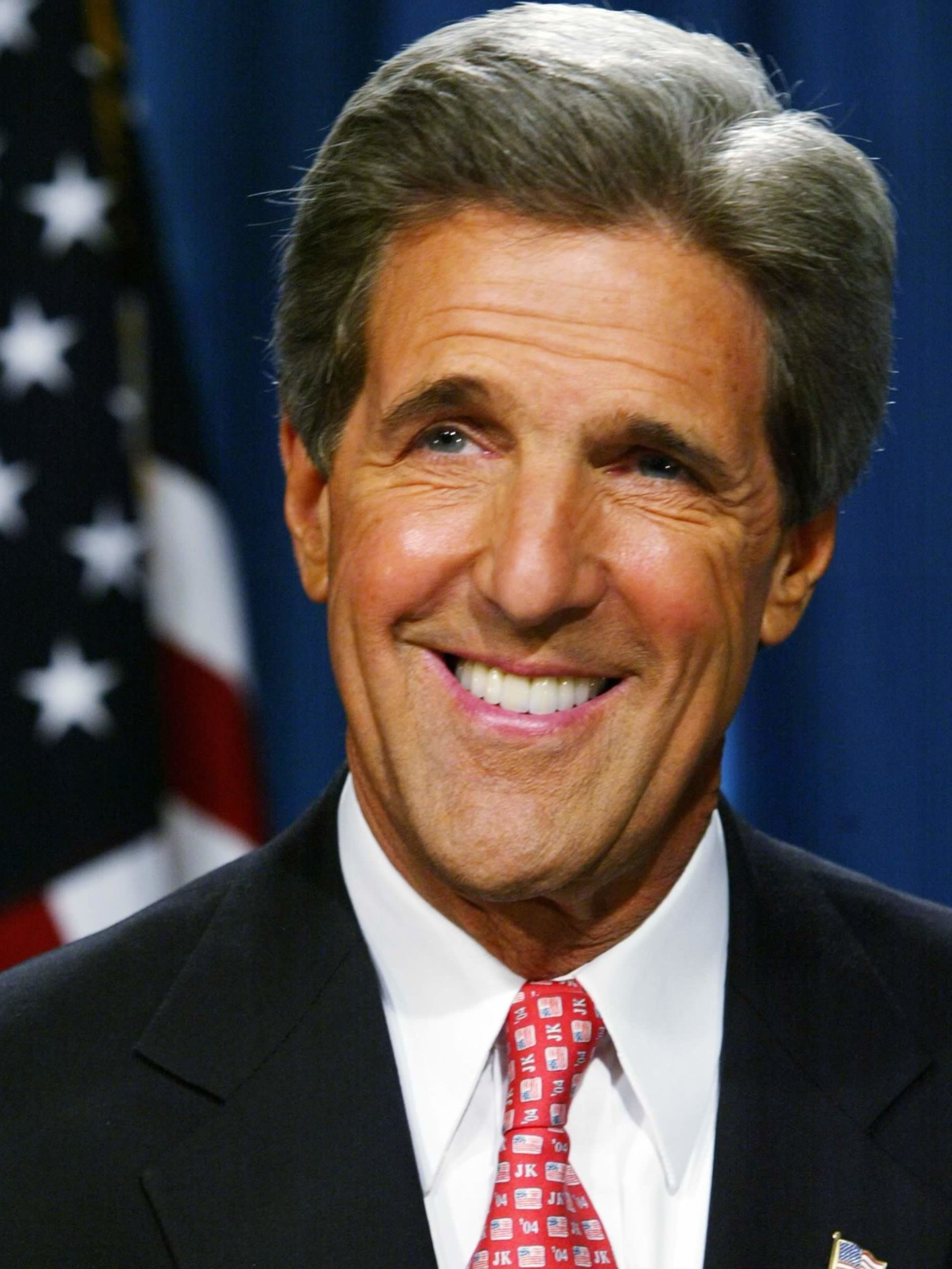

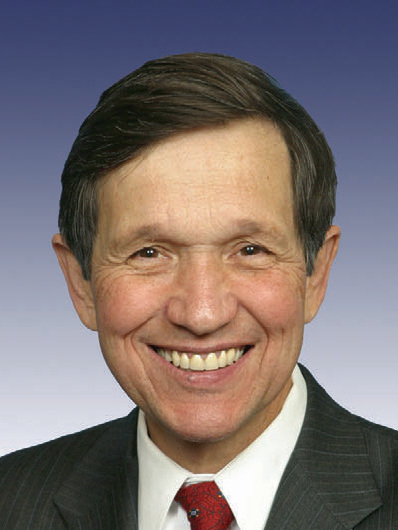
Candidate	John Kerry	Uncommitted	Dennis Kucinich
Home state	Massachusetts	–	Ohio
Delegate count	13	0	0
Popular vote	514	44	36
Percentage	79.44%	6.80%	5.56%
- County results Kerry: 55–60% 60–65% 75–80% 80–85% 85–90% 95–100% Edwardsː 40–45%

The 2004 Wyoming Democratic presidential caucuses took place on February 3, 2004, as part of the 2004 Democratic Party presidential primaries. The delegate allocation is Proportional, the candidates are awarded delegates in proportion to the percentage of votes received.

Because Kerry had already won the nomination, and the small number of people in the state that are registered Democrats, the turnout was extremely low.

== Results ==
2004 Wyoming Democratic presidential caucuses
Party	Candidate	Votes	Percentage	Delegates
Democratic	John Kerry	514	79.44%	13
Democratic	Uncommitted	44	6.80%	0
Democratic	Dennis Kucinich	36	5.56%	0
Democratic	John Edwards	27	4.17%	0
Democratic	Howard Dean	23	3.56%	0
Democratic	Al Sharpton	3	0.46%	0
Totals		647	100.00%	13
Voter turnout		%	—	

== See also ==
- 2004 Democratic Party presidential primaries
