= 2000 New Hampshire Democratic presidential primary =

- February 1, 2000

29 Democratic National Convention delegates (22 pledged, 7 unpledged) The number of pledged delegates received is determined by the popular vote

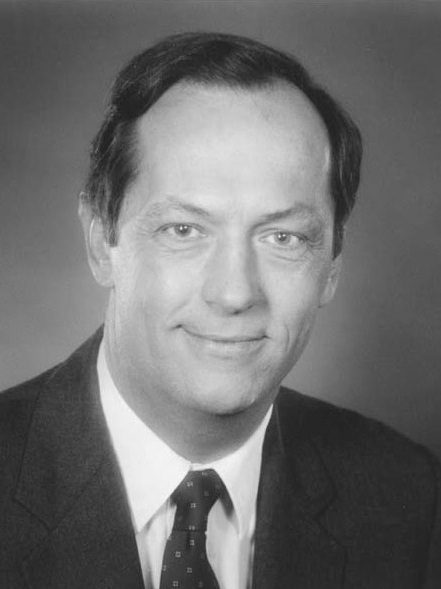
Candidate	Al Gore	Bill Bradley
Home state	Tennessee	New Jersey
Delegate count	13	9
Popular vote	76,897	70,502
Percentage	49.73%	45.59%

Gore
40 – 50%
50 – 60%
60 – 70%
Bradley
40 – 50%
50 – 60%
60 – 70%
70 – 80%
Tie/No Votes
40 – 50%
50%
No votes

The 2000 New Hampshire Democratic presidential primary, was the second major test of the leading contenders for the Democratic Party's nomination as its candidate for the 2000 presidential election, took place on February 1, 2000.

== Candidates ==
- Bill Bradley, former U.S. senator from New Jersey
- Al Gore, incumbent vice president of the United States from Tennessee

== Campaign ==
Vice President Al Gore was seen as the frontrunner for the nomination, but after Bill Bradley received 36% in Iowa, raised significant money, and was catching up to Gore in the polls, many pundits believed that Bradley could defeat Gore and would use the momentum to propel himself into the nomination on Super Tuesday.

== Polling ==
Poll source	Date(s)	Sample size	Al Gore (D)	Bill Bradley (D)	Other / undecided (Note: Calculated by taking the difference of 100% and all other candidates combined.)
Gallup	January 31, 2000	697	54%	42%	4%
University of New Hampshire Survey Center	January 31, 2000	400	49%	46%	5%
American Research Group	January 30, 2000	600	50%	45%	5%
Hart Research Associates/Public Opinion Strategies	January 30, 2000	502 (Note: Average of multiple versions or turnout models listed in the poll; the source dataset gives the sample size as 501.5.)	49%	37%	14%
KRC Research	January 30, 2000	400	48%	42%	10%
Zogby Analytics	January 30, 2000	600	52%	40%	8%
CBS News/The New York Times	January 29, 2000	347	55%	39%	6%
Franklin Pierce University	January 29, 2000	355	47%	41%	12%
Quinnipiac University	January 29, 2000	430	53%	36%	11%
RKM Research and Communications Inc.	January 29, 2000	402	47%	44%	9%
SurveyUSA	January 29, 2000	619	56%	41%	3%
University of Massachusetts	January 29, 2000	400	45%	44%	11%
Gallup	January 28, 2000	600 (Note: Sample size unavailable; 600 is a default estimate used in the source dataset.)	48%	47%	5%
KRC Research	January 28, 2000	400	51%	41%	8%
Mason-Dixon Polling & Strategy	January 28, 2000	411	53%	40%	7%
American Research Group	January 27, 2000	600	50%	43%	7%
University of New Hampshire Survey Center	January 27, 2000	400	54%	42%	4%
Zogby Analytics	January 27, 2000	600	51%	40%	9%
Dartmouth College	January 26, 2000	500	48%	41%	11%
KRC Research	January 26, 2000	400	48%	40%	12%
Dartmouth College	January 25, 2000	365	54%	40%	6%
Franklin Pierce University	January 25, 2000	447	52%	37%	11%
Gallup	January 25, 2000	467	57%	39%	4%
RKM Research and Communications Inc.	January 25, 2000	385	46%	40%	14%
	January 24, 2000	Gore wins the Iowa caucuses			

== Results ==
2000 New Hampshire Democratic presidential primary results
Party		Candidate	Votes	Percentage	Delegates
	Democratic	Al Gore	76,897	49.73%	13
	Democratic	Bill Bradley	70,502	45.59%	9
	Democratic	Charlie Buckley	322	0.21%	0
	Democratic	Heather A. Harder	192	0.12%	0
	Democratic	Jeffrey B. Peter	156	0.10%	0
	Democratic	John B. Eaton	134	0.09%	0
	Democratic	Lyndon LaRouche, Jr.	124	0.08%	0
	Democratic	Jim Taylor	87	0.06%	0
	Democratic	Mark Greenstein	75	0.05%	0
	Democratic	Nathaniel T. Mullins	35	0.02%	0
	Democratic	Edward T. O'Donnell, Jr.	35	0.02%	0
	Democratic	Willie Felix Carter	30	0.02%	0
	Democratic	Randolph W. Crow	29	0.02%	0
	Democratic	Vincent S. Hamm	22	0.01%	0
	Democratic	Thomas Koos	19	0.01%	0
	Democratic	Michael Stok	18	0.01%	0
	Democratic	Write-in candidates	5,962	3.86%	0
	Democratic	Unallocated	0	0%	7
Totals	Democratic	All Candidates	154,639	100.00%	22

Al Gore won 8 of New Hampshire's 10 counties. Bill Bradley lost the rest of the primaries by large margins and Al Gore would eventually lose the general election to Governor of Texas George W. Bush.

== See also ==
- New Hampshire primaries
- 2000 Democratic Party presidential primaries
