= 2000 Iowa Democratic presidential caucuses =

- January 24th, 2000

57 Democratic National Convention delegates (47 pledged; 10 unpledged) (Note: The number of pledged national convention delegates is calculated through the number of state delegate equivalents (SDEs) won, however, a candidate must get both at least 15% of the total vote to get statewide delegates and at least 15% of the vote in a congressional district to get district delegates from that district. Each precinct has a certain number of SDEs and allocates them based on how many caucus goers there are for each candidate at that precinct.)

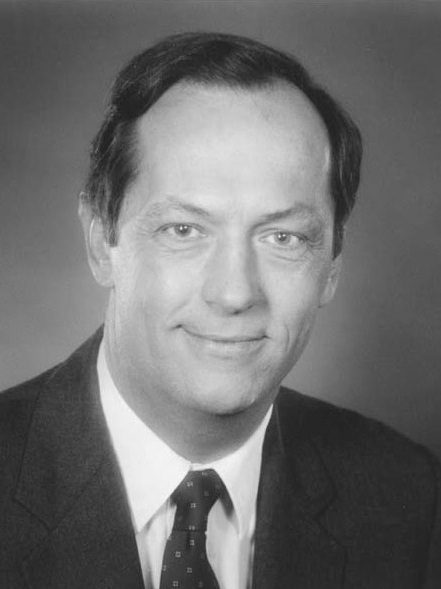
| Candidate | Al Gore | Bill Bradley |
| Home state | Tennessee | New Jersey |
| Delegate count | 29 | 18 |
| SDEs | 1,257 | 732 |
| Percentage (of SDEs) | 62.85% | 36.60% |
- Caucus results by county Gore: 50–60% 60–70% 70–80% 80–90% Bradley: 50–60% Tie: 40–50% 50–60%

The 2000 Iowa Democratic presidential caucuses occurred on January 24, and was the state caucuses of the Iowa Democratic Party. It was the first election for the Democrats of the 2000 presidential election.

== Campaign ==
Vice President Al Gore was seen as the frontrunner for the nomination, and successfully painted Bill Bradley as aloof and indifferent to rural issues. The Vice President received the endorsement from the Governor of Iowa Tom Vilsack and Senator Tom Harkin and had a tremendous lead over Senator Bradley, though Bradley got the endorsement of the Des Moines Register. Bradley started to gain momentum and the race become close. A week before the caucus polls had it 40% to 49% in Gore’s favor. On January 23, 2000, a day before the primary polls had Al Gore winning by 2 or 3 points.

== Polling ==
| Poll source | Date(s) | Sample size | Margin of error | Al Gore (D) | Bill Bradley (D) | Other / undecided (Note: Calculated by taking the difference of 100% and all other candidates combined.) |
|---|---|---|---|---|---|---|
| Selzer & Co. | January 19, 2000 | 600 | — | 56% | 28% | 16% |
| Mason-Dixon Polling & Strategy | January 18, 2000 | 409 | — | 53% | 32% | 15% |
| Research 2000 | January 18, 2000 | 304 | — | 56% | 32% | 12% |
| University of Iowa Hawkeye Poll Cooperative | January 18, 2000 | 330 | — | 63% | 24% | 13% |
| Los Angeles Times | January 14, 2000 | 571 | — | 58% | 35% | 7% |
| Personal Marketing Research | January 12, 2000 | 500 | — | 57% | 31% | 12% |
| North Star Opinion Research | January 10, 2000 | 300 | — | 48% | 33% | 19% |
| Research 2000 | January 10, 2000 | 301 | — | 52% | 34% | 14% |
| PSI | January 4, 2000 | 300 | — | 45% | 32% | 23% |
| Selzer & Co. | January 4, 2000 | 500 | — | 54% | 33% | 13% |

== Results ==
National pledged delegates determined: 47 (of 57)

2000 Iowa Democratic presidential caucus results
| Party | Candidate | Votes (State Delegate Equivalents) | Percentage | Pledged National Delegates (expected on January 24) |
|---|---|---|---|---|
| Democratic | Al Gore | 1,257 | 62.85% | 29 |
| Democratic | Bill Bradley | 732 | 36.60% | 18 |
| Democratic | Uncommitted | 11 | 0.55% | 0 |
| Democratic | Unallocated | 0 | 0.0% | 10 |
| Totals | | 2,000 | 100.00% | 47 |
| Voter turnout | | % | | — |

Al Gore won 91 of Iowa's 99 counties. Bill Bradley lost the rest of the primaries by large margins and Al Gore would eventually lose the general election to Governor of Texas George W. Bush.

== See also ==
- Iowa caucuses
- 2000 Iowa Republican presidential caucuses
- 2000 Democratic Party presidential primaries
