= 2000 Illinois Democratic presidential primary =

- March 21, 2000

190 delegates to the Democratic National Convention (161 pledged, 29 unpledged) The number of pledged delegates received is determined by the popular vote

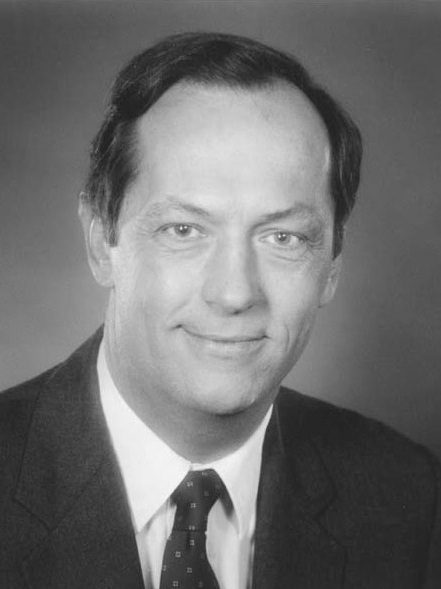
Candidate	Al Gore	Bill Bradley (withdrawn)
Home state	Tennessee	New Jersey
Delegate count	149	12
Popular vote	682,932	115,320
Percentage	84.35%	14.24%
- Primary results by county Gore: 70–80% 80–90%

Pledged national convention delegates
Type	Del.	Type	Del.
CD1	8	CD11	5
CD2	8	CD12	6
CD3	5	CD13	4
CD4	4	CD14	4
CD5	5	CD15	4
CD6	4	CD16	4
CD7	7	CD17	5
CD8	4	CD18	5
CD9	6	CD19	7
CD10	4	CD20	6
PLEO	21	At-large	35
Total pledged delegates			161

The 2000 Illinois Democratic presidential primary took place on March 21, 2000, the third primary Tuesday of the month, as the only state voting on that day in the Democratic Party primaries for the 2000 presidential election. The Illinois primary was an open primary, with the state awarding 190 delegates to the 2000 Democratic National Convention, of which 161 were pledged delegates allocated on the basis of the results of the primary.

Vice president Al Gore was the winner of the Illinois primary. Gore was victorious in all counties winning almost 85% of the vote and 149 delegates, while senator Bill Bradley received the rest of 14% and 12 delegates. Together with his previous victories on Mini Tuesday in Florida, Louisiana, Mississippi, Oklahoma, Tennessee, and Texas, Gore greatly expanded the gap in delegates between him and Bradley.

== Procedure ==
Illinois was the only state which held primaries on March 21, 2000, the week following Mini Tuesday, which included contests in Florida, Louisiana, Mississippi, Oklahoma, Tennessee, and Texas.

Voting took place throughout the state from 6:00 a.m. until 7:00 p.m. In the open primary, candidates had to meet a threshold of 15 percent at the congressional district or statewide level in order to be considered viable. The 161 pledged delegates to the 2020 Democratic National Convention were allocated proportionally on the basis of the results of the primary. Of these, between 4 and 8 were allocated to each of the state's 20 congressional districts and another 21 were allocated to party leaders and elected officials (PLEO delegates), in addition to 35 at-large delegates.

The national convention delegation meeting was held to vote on the 34 at-large and 20 pledged PLEO delegates for the Democratic National Convention through a quorum of district delegates. The delegation also included 26 unpledged PLEO delegates: 14 members of the Democratic National Committee, 11 members of Congress (1 senator, Dick Durbin, and 10 representatives, Bobby Rush, Jesse Jackson, Jr., Bill Lipinski, Luis Gutiérrez, Rod Blagojevich, Danny Davis, Jan Schakowsky, Jerry Costello, Lane Evans, and David Phelps), 1 distinguished party leader, and 3 add-ons.

== Candidates ==
The following candidates appeared on the ballot:

- Al Gore
- Lyndon LaRouche, Jr.

Withdrawn

- Bill Bradley

== Results ==
2000 Illinois Democratic presidential primary
Candidate	Votes	%	Delegates
Al Gore	682,932	84.35	149
Bill Bradley (withdrawn)	115,320	14.24	12
Lyndon LaRouche, Jr.	11,415	1.41	
Unallocated	-	-	29
Total	809,667	100%	190
