= 2000 Minnesota Democratic presidential caucuses =

- March 11, 2000

90 delegates to the Democratic National Convention (74 pledged, 16 unpledged) The number of pledged delegates received is determined by the popular vote

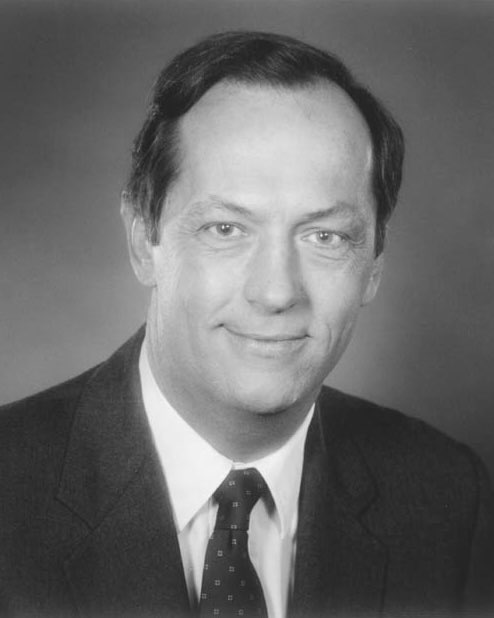

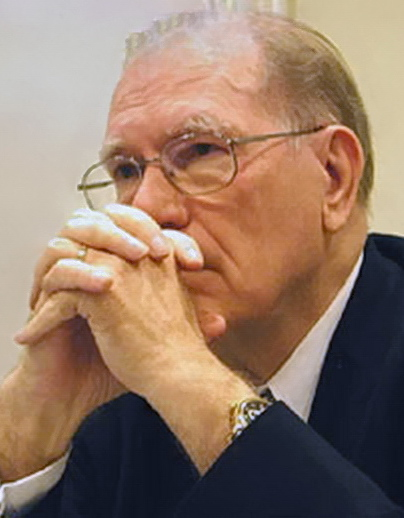
Candidate	Al Gore	Bill Bradley (withdrawn)	Lyndon LaRouche Jr.
Home state	Tennessee	New Jersey	Virginia
Delegate count	72	2	0
Popular vote	11,100	1,800	1,650
Percentage	74.00%	12.00%	11.00%

Pledged national convention delegates
Type	Del.
CD1	5
CD2	5
CD3	6
CD4	7
CD5	7
CD6	6
CD7	5
CD8	7
PLEO	10
At-large	16
Total pledged delegates	74

The 2000 Minnesota Democratic presidential caucuses took place on March 11, 2000, as one of three contests scheduled on the weekend following Super Tuesday in the Democratic Party primaries for the 2000 presidential election, following the Colorado primary and the Utah primary the day before. The Minnesota caucus was an open caucus, with the state awarding 90 delegates towards the 2000 Democratic National Convention, of which 74 were pledged delegates allocated on the basis of the results of the caucus.

Vice president Al Gore won with 74% of the vote, gathering 72 delegates. Senator Bill Bradley placed second with 12% and 2 delegates. Lyndon LaRouche Jr., a conspiracy theorist who had ballot access in most states secured 11%, one of his best performances in any contest, but gained no delegates.

== Procedure ==
Minnesota state law specifies that precinct caucuses will take place at 7 p.m. on the first Tuesday in March, that is March 7, which lined Minnesota up to have a nominating contest on Super Tuesday, along with 16 other states and one territory. However, because courts have ruled that the conduct of a political party's affairs is up to the party alone, not the Legislature, the Democratic Farmer-Labor Party announced it will be holding a binding presidential primary in conjunction with the party's precinct meetings on Saturday and Sunday, March 11 and 12.

Minnesota was one of three states that held primaries on March 11, 2000, the weekend after Super Tuesday.

Voting took place from 7:00 a.m. until 8:00 p.m. Under state party rules, candidates had to meet a threshold of 15 percent at the congressional district or statewide level in order to be considered viable. The 48 pledged delegates to the 2020 Democratic National Convention were allocated proportionally on the basis of the results of the primary. Of the 48 pledged delegates, between 5 and 7 were allocated to each of the state's 8 congressional districts and another 10 were allocated to party leaders and elected officials (PLEO delegates), in addition to 16 at-large delegates.

The delegation also included 17 unpledged PLEO delegates: 7 members of the Democratic National Committee, 7 members of Congress (Senator Paul Wellstone, and 6 representatives, David Minge, Bruce Vento, Martin Olav Sabo, Bill Luther, Collin Peterson, and Jim Oberstar), 1 distinguished party leader, that being former vice president Walter Mondale, and 2 add-ons.

== Candidates ==
The following candidates appeared on the ballot:

- Al Gore
- Lyndon LaRouche Jr.
- Heather A. Harder

Withdrawn

- Bill Bradley

== Results ==
2000 Minnesota Democratic presidential caucuses
Candidate	Votes	%	Delegates
Al Gore	11,100	74.00	72
Bill Bradley (withdrawn)	1,800	12.00	2
Lyndon LaRouche Jr.	1,650	11.00	
Heather A. Harder	450	3.00	
Unallocated	-	-	16
Total	15,000	100%	90
