= 2000 District of Columbia Democratic presidential primary =

- May 2, 2000

33 delegates to the Democratic National Convention (17 pledged, 16 unpledged) The number of pledged delegates received is determined by the popular vote
Candidate	Al Gore
Home state	Tennessee
Delegate count	17
Popular vote	18,621
Percentage	95.90%

Pledged national convention delegates
Type	Del.
MD1	5
MD2	6
PLEO	2
At-large	4
Total pledged delegates	17

The 2000 District of Columbia Democratic presidential primary took place on May 2, 2000, as one of 3 contests scheduled in the Democratic Party primaries for the 2000 presidential election, following the Alaska caucus the weekend before. The District of Columbia primary was a closed primary, with the district awarding 33 delegates towards the 2000 Democratic National Convention, of which 17 were pledged delegates allocated on the basis of the results of the primary

Vice president and presumptive nominee Al Gore won the primary with 95% of the vote, earning all 17 delegates. Senator Bill Bradley was not on the ballot while conspiracy theorist and perennial candidate Lyndon LaRouche Jr. came in second with 4%.

== Procedure ==
The District of Columbia's Democratic primary took place on May 2, 2000, the same date as the North Carolina primary and the Indiana Primary.

Voting took place across the district from 7:00 a.m. until 8:00 p.m. local time. In the closed primary, candidates had to meet a threshold of 15% at municipal districts or the whole federal district in order to be considered viable. The 17 pledged delegates to the 2000 Democratic National Convention were allocated proportionally on the basis of the primary results. Of these, 5 and 6 were allocated to the two municipal districts (each consisting of 4 of Washington, D.C.'s wards) and another 2 were allocated to party leaders and elected officials (PLEO delegates), in addition to 4 at-large delegates.

The state party committee then met after the primary to vote on the 2 pledged PLEO delegates, to finally vote on the 13 municipal district delegates, and to vote on the 5 at-large delegates. The delegation also included 15 unpledged PLEO delegates: 10 members of the Democratic National Committee, 3 "members of Congress" (consisting of the congressional nonvoting delegate Eleanor Holmes Norton and two non-congressional shadow senators), the mayor Anthony A. Williams, 1 distinguished party leader, and 1 add-on.

== Candidates ==
The following candidates appeared on the ballot:

- Al Gore
- Lyndon LaRouche Jr.

== Results ==
2000 District of Columbia Democratic presidential primary
Candidate	Votes	%	Delegates
Al Gore	18,621	95.90	17
Lyndon LaRouche Jr.	796	4.10	
Uncommitted	-	-	16
Total	19,417	100%	33
