= 2000 Idaho Democratic presidential primary =

- May 23, 2000

23 delegates to the Democratic National Convention (18 pledged, 5 unpledged) The number of pledged delegates received is determined by the caucus vote

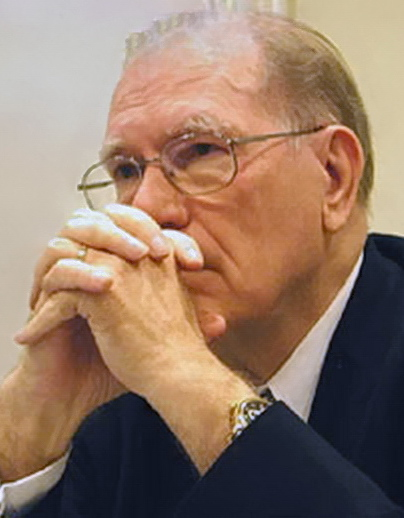
Candidate	Al Gore	Uncommitted	Lyndon LaRouche Jr.
Home state	Tennessee	–	Virginia
Popular vote	27,025	5,722	2,941
Percentage	75.73%	16.03%	8.24%
- Primary results by county Gore: 50–60% 60–70% 70–80% 80–90% 90–100%

The 2000 Idaho Democratic presidential primary took place on May 23, 2000, as one of three states voting the week after the Oregon primary in the Democratic Party primaries for the 2000 presidential election. The Idaho primary was an open primary, allowing voting of any registration to participate, and awarded 23 delegates towards the 2000 Democratic National Convention, of whom 18 were pledged delegates allocated, but not on the basis of the primary results. The Idaho caucus earlier in the year was the binding contest, where as the primary was simply a preference vote.

Vice president Al Gore and Lyndon LaRouche Jr. were the only candidates on the ballot, and Gore won the primary with almost 75% of the vote, but did not receive any delegates, as he had already won the caucus in March.

== Procedure ==
Idaho was one of three states, along with Arkansas and Kentucky that held primaries on May 23, 2000, one week after the Oregon primary.

Voting took place throughout the state from 8:00 a.m. until 8:00 p.m. local time.

Pledged national convention delegates
Type	Del.
CD1	6
CD2	6
PLEO	2
At-large	4
Total pledged delegates	18

== Candidates ==
The following candidates appeared on the ballot:

- Al Gore
- Lyndon LaRouche Jr.

There was also an uncommitted option.

== Results ==
2000 Idaho Democratic presidential primary
Candidate	Votes	%	Delegates
Al Gore	27,025	75.73	
Uncommitted	5,722	16.03	23
Lyndon LaRouche Jr.	2,941	8.24	
Total	35,688	100%	-
