= 2000 North Carolina Democratic presidential primary =

- May 2, 2000

103 delegates to the Democratic National Convention (86 pledged, 17 unpledged) The number of pledged delegates received is determined by the popular vote

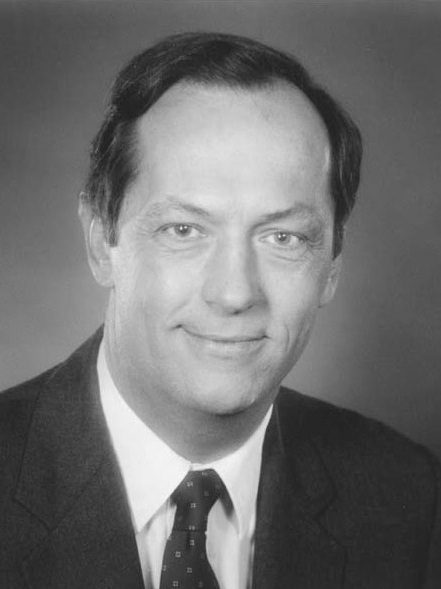

Candidate	Al Gore	Bill Bradley (withdrawn)	Uncommitted
Home state	Tennessee	New Jersey	–
Delegate count	73	13	0
Popular vote	383,696	99,796	49,905
Percentage	70.41%	18.31%	9.16%
- Primary results by county Gore: 50–60% 60–70% 70–80% 80–90%

The 2000 North Carolina Democratic presidential primary took place on May 2, 2000, as one of 3 contests scheduled in the Democratic Party primaries for the 2000 presidential election, following the Alaska caucus the weekend before. The North Carolina primary was a semi-closed primary, with the state awarding 103 delegates towards the 2000 Democratic National Convention, of which 86 were pledged delegates allocated on the basis of the results of the primary.

Vice president Al Gore won the state with 70% of the vote, gaining 73 delegates, far ahead of senator Bill Bradley, who attained around 18% and 13 delegates. The Uncommitted option won around 9% of the vote and Lyndon LaRouche Jr. won just 2%, failing to meet the threshold to attain delegates.

== Procedure ==
North Carolina's Democratic primary took place on May 2, 2000, the same date as the Indiana primary and the D.C. Primary.

Voting took place throughout the state from 6:30 a.m. until 7:30 p.m. In the semi-closed primary, candidates had to meet a threshold of 15 percent at the congressional district or statewide level in order to be considered viable. The 86 pledged delegates to the 2000 Democratic National Convention were to be allocated proportionally on the basis of the results of the primary. Of these, between 4 and 7 were allocated to each of the state's 12 congressional districts and another 11 were allocated to party leaders and elected officials (PLEO delegates), in addition to 19 at-large delegates.

The delegation also included 12 unpledged PLEO delegates: 8 members of the Democratic National Committee, 6 members from Congress, those being Senator John Edwards, Representatives Eva Clayton, Bob Etheridge, David Price, Mike McIntyre, Mel Watt, the governor Jim Hunt, and 2 add-ons.

Pledged national convention delegates
Type	Del.	Type	Del.
CD1	5	CD7	5
CD2	5	CD8	4
CD3	4	CD9	4
CD4	7	CD10	4
CD5	4	CD11	5
CD6	4	CD12	5
PLEO	11	At-large	19
Total pledged delegates			86

== Candidates ==
The following candidates appeared on the ballot:

- Al Gore
- Lyndon LaRouche Jr.

Withdrawn

- Bill Bradley

There was also an Uncommitted option.

== Results ==
2000 North Carolina Democratic presidential primary
Candidate	Votes	%	Delegates
Al Gore	383,696	70.41	73
Bill Bradley (withdrawn)	99,796	18.31	13
Uncommitted	49,905	9.16	17
Lyndon LaRouche Jr.	11,525	2.11	
Total	544,922	100%	103
