= 2000 Arkansas Democratic presidential primary =

- May 23, 2000

47 delegates to the Democratic National Convention (37 pledged, 10 unpledged) The number of pledged delegates received is determined by the popular vote

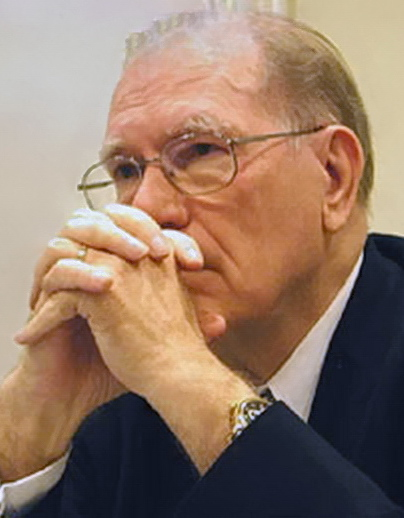
Candidate	Al Gore	Lyndon LaRouche Jr.
Home state	Tennessee	Virginia
Delegate count	37	0
Popular vote	193,750	53,150
Percentage	78.47%	21.53%
- Primary results by county Gore: 60–70% 70–80% 80–90% 90–100% No votes

The 2000 Arkansas Democratic presidential primary took place on May 23, 2000, as one of two contests scheduled for the Democratic Party primaries for the 2000 presidential election, following the Oregon primary the weekend before. The Arkansas primary was an open primary, with the state awarding 47 delegates towards the 2000 Democratic National Convention, of which 37 were pledged delegates allocated on the basis of the results of the primary.

Vice president Al Gore won every county but Arkansas County and received 78% of the vote and all 37 pledged delegates, despite the fact that perennial candidate Lyndon LaRouche Jr. had surpassed the 15% threshold. DNC rules had stated that LaRouche was not eligible for delegates due to his status as a convicted felon and not being a registered Democrat. The Democratic National Committee stated they will not include votes cast for LaRouche in their delegate computations. Hence, Gore is the only candidate to receive the 15% of the vote needed to qualify for delegates.

== Procedure ==
Arkansas was one of two states holding primaries on May 23, 2000, along with Kentucky and Idaho, who held a non-binding preference primary.

In the open primary, candidates had to meet a threshold of 15 percent at the congressional district or statewide level in order to be considered viable. The 37 pledged delegates to the 2000 Democratic National Convention were allocated proportionally on the basis of the results of the primary. Of these, 6 were allocated to each of the state's 4 congressional districts and another 5 were allocated to party leaders and elected officials (PLEO delegates), in addition to 8 at-large delegates. The remaining 10 National Convention delegates consist of 9 Unpledged PLEOs and 1 Unpledged "add-on"; these 10 delegates will go to the Democratic National Convention officially "unpledged." The breakdown of unpledged delegates is 5 Democratic National Committee members, 3 Members of Congress (1 Senator, Blanche Lincoln, and 2 Representatives, Marion Berry and Vic Snyder), 1 distinguished party leader (President Bill Clinton), and 1 add-on

Pledged national convention delegates
Type	Del.
CD1	6
CD2	6
CD3	6
CD4	6
PLEO	5
At-large	8
Total pledged delegates	37

== Candidates ==
The following candidates appeared on the ballot:

- Al Gore
- Lyndon LaRouche Jr.

There was also an uncommitted option.

== Results ==
2000 Arkansas Democratic presidential primary
Candidate	Votes	%	Delegates
Al Gore	193,750	78.47	37
Lyndon LaRouche Jr.	53,150	21.53	
Uncommitted	-	-	10
Total	246,900	100%	47
