= 2000 South Dakota Democratic presidential primary =

- June 6, 2000

22 delegates to the Democratic National Convention
Candidate	Al Gore
Home state	Tennessee
Delegate count	22
Percentage	100.0%

The 2000 South Dakota Democratic presidential primary took place on June 6, 2000, as part of the 2000 presidential primaries for the 2000 presidential election. 22 delegates to the 2000 Democratic National Convention were allocated to the presidential candidates, the contest was held alongside primaries in Alabama, Montana, New Jersey and New Mexico.

Vice President AI Gore won the contest easily by taking all delegates.

== Candidates ==
The following candidates on the ballot:

- AI Gore
- Uncommitted (voting option)

== Results ==
There were no popular votes in the contest, but Al Gore still won by taking all delegates.

South Dakota Democratic primary, June 6, 2000
Candidate	Votes	Percentage	Actual delegate count		
Candidate	Votes	Percentage	Bound	Unbound	Total
AI Gore			22		22
Total:			22		22

== See also ==
- 2000 United States presidential election in South Dakota
- 2000 United States presidential election
- 2000 Democratic Party presidential primaries
