= 2000 New Jersey Democratic presidential primary =

- June 6, 2000

124 delegates to the Democratic National Convention (105 pledged, 19 unpledged) The number of pledged delegates received is determined by the popular vote

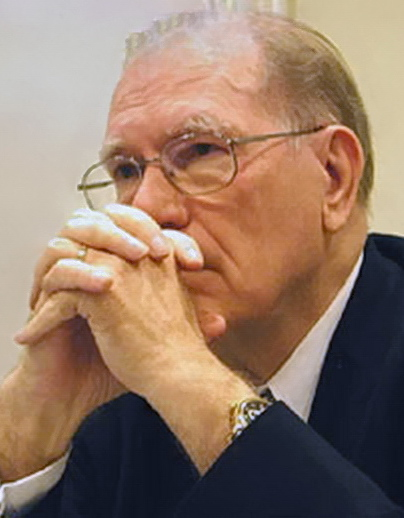
Candidate	Al Gore	Lyndon LaRouche Jr.
Home state	Tennessee	Virginia
Delegate count	105	0
Popular vote	358,951	19,321
Percentage	94.89%	5.11%
- Primary results by county Gore: 80–90% 90–100%

The 2000 New Jersey Democratic presidential primary took place on June 6, 2000, alongside the Alabama, Montana, New Mexico, and South Dakota primaries, as part of the Democratic Party primaries for the 2000 presidential election. It was one of the five final primary elections ahead of the 2000 Democratic National Convention. The New Jersey primary was a semi-closed primary, with the state awarding 124 delegates, of which 105 were pledged delegates allocated on the basis of the results of the primary.

Presumptive nominee and vice president Al Gore won nearly 95% of the vote and all delegates. Conspiracy theorist and political activist Lyndon LaRouche Jr. received roughly 5% of the vote.

New Jersey's former US Senator Bill Bradley had been an early competitor for the Democratic nomination but had dropped out by March 9 and did not appear on the ballot.

== Procedure ==
New Jersey held its primary elections on June 6, 2000, the same day as that of Alabama, Montana, New Mexico, and the South Dakota.

Voting was expected to take place throughout the state from 6:00 a.m. until 8:00 p.m. In the semi-closed primary, candidates had to meet a threshold of 15 percent at the delegate district or statewide level in order to be considered viable. The 105 pledged delegates to the 2000 Democratic National Convention were allocated proportionally on the basis of the results of the primary. Of these, between 3 and 4 were allocated to each of the state's 20 "delegate districts", each consisting of two New Jersey Legislative Districts, and another 19 were allocated to party leaders and elected officials (PLEO delegates), in addition to 23 at-large delegates. In addition, 23 at-large National Convention delegates plus 14 Pledged PLEOs are to be allocated to presidential contenders based on the primary vote statewide. A mandatory 15 percent threshold was required in order for a presidential contender to be allocated National Convention delegates at either the delegate district or statewide level.

The Democratic state committee subsequently convened at the state convention to vote on the 23 at-large and 14 pledged PLEO delegates to send to the Democratic National Convention. The delegation also included 17 unpledged PLEO delegates: 8 members of the Democratic National Committee, 9 members of Congress (both senators, Robert Torricelli and Frank Lautenberg), and 7 representatives (Rob Andrews, Frank Pallone, Bill Pascrell, Steve Rothman, Donald Payne, Rush Holt Jr., and Bob Menendez), and 2 add-ons.

Pledged national convention delegates
Type	Del.	Type	Del.	Type	Del.
D1 (LD1, LD3)	3	D8 (LD14, LD15)	4	D15 (LD28, LD29)	4
D2 (LD2, LD9)	4	D9 (LD16, LD17)	3	D16 (LD31, LD33)	4
D3 (LD4, LD5)	4	D10 (LD18, LD19)	3	D17 (LD32, LD36)	3
D4 (LD6, LD7)	4	D11 (LD23, LD24)	4	D18 (LD34, LD35)	3
D5 (LD8, LD12)	3	D12 (LD21, LD27)	3	D19 (LD37, LD38)	3
D6 (LD10, LD30)	3	D13 (LD20, LD22)	3	D20 (LD39, LD40)	3
D7 (LD11, LD13)	4	D14 (LD25, LD26)	4	PLEO / At-large	14 / 23
Total pledged delegates					105

== Candidates ==
The following candidates appeared on the ballot:

- Al Gore
- Lyndon LaRouche Jr.

There was also an Uncommitted option.

== Polling ==
Poll source	Date(s) administered	Sample size	Margin of error	Bill Bradley	Al Gore	Other	Undecided
Quinnipiac	July 13–20, 1999	[data missing]	[data missing]	54%	35%	1%	10%
Quinnipiac	February 16–21, 2000	374 RV	±5.1%	51%	40%	–	8%

== Results ==
2000 New Jersey Democratic presidential primary
Candidate	Votes	%	Delegates
Al Gore	358,951	94.89	105
Lyndon LaRouche Jr.	19,321	5.11	
Uncommitted	-	-	19
Total	378,272	100%	124
