= 2000 Montana Democratic presidential primary =

- June 6, 2000

24 delegates to the Democratic National Convention (17 pledged, 7 unpledged) The number of pledged delegates received is determined by the popular vote

Candidate	Al Gore	No preference
Home state	Tennessee	–
Delegate count	15	2
Popular vote	68,420	19,447
Percentage	77.87%	22.13%
- Primary results by county Gore: 50–60% 60–70% 70–80% 80–90% 90–100%

Pledged national convention delegates
Type	Del.
District	11
At-large	4
PLEO	2
Total pledged delegates	17

The 2000 Montana Democratic presidential primary took place on June 6, 2000, as one of five final primaries on the same day in the Democratic Party primaries for the 2000 presidential election. The Montana primary was an open primary, with the state awarding 24 delegates to the 2000 Democratic National Convention, of whom 17 were pledged delegates allocated on the basis of the primary results.

Vice president and presumptive nominee Al Gore won the primary with more than 77% of the vote and won all delegates except two, strengthening his victory as the Democratic nominee ahead of the general election.

== Procedure ==
Montana was one of five states to vote on June 6, 2000, in the Democratic primaries, along with Alabama, New Jersey, New Mexico, and South Dakota.

Voting took place throughout the state from 7 a.m. until 8 p.m. In the open primary, 11 district delegates are allocated proportionally to presidential contenders based on the primary results statewide as Montana has only a single at-large congressional seat. In addition, 4 at-large National Convention delegates plus 2 Pledged PLEOs are also to be allocated to presidential contenders based on the primary vote statewide. A mandatory 15 percent threshold is required in order for a presidential contender to be allocated National Convention delegates at the statewide level. Bill Bradley, having withdrawn from the campaign, is not entitled to receive At-Large and PLEO delegates. The 17 pledged delegates to the 2000 Democratic National Convention were allocated proportionally on the basis of the primary results. The remaining 7 National Convention delegates consist of 6 Unpledged PLEOs and 1 Unpledged "add-on"; these 7 delegates will go to the Democratic National Convention officially "unpledged." The breakdown of unpledged delegates is 4 Democratic National Committee members, 1 member of Congress, Senator Max Baucus, Montana's sole Congressional Democrat at the time, 1 distinguished party leader, and 1 add-on.

== Candidates ==
The following candidates appeared on the ballot:

- Al Gore

There was also an Uncommitted option.

== Results ==
2000 Montana Democratic presidential primary
Candidate	Votes	%	Delegates
Al Gore	68,420	77.87	15
No preference	19,447	22.13	9
Total	87,867	100%	24
