= 2000 Indiana Democratic presidential primary =

- May 2, 2000

88 delegates to the Democratic National Convention (72 pledged, 16 unpledged) The number of pledged delegates received is determined by the popular vote

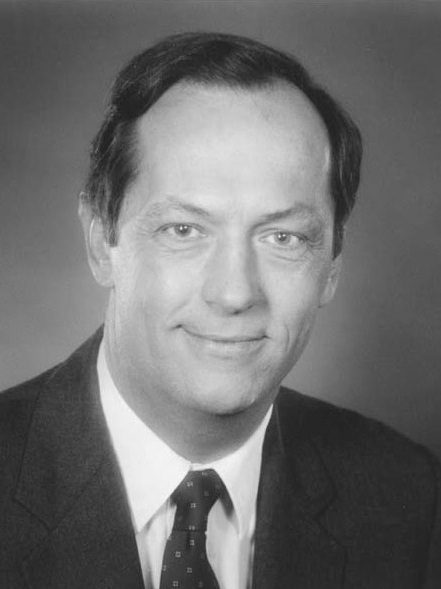
Candidate	Al Gore	Bill Bradley (withdrawn)
Home state	Tennessee	New Jersey
Delegate count	62	10
Popular vote	219,604	64,339
Percentage	74.91%	21.95%
- Primary results by county Gore: 60–70% 70–80% 80–90% Bradley: 60–70%

The 2000 Indiana Democratic presidential primary took place on May 2, 2000, as one of 3 contests scheduled in the Democratic Party primaries for the 2000 presidential election, following the Alaska caucus the weekend before. The North Carolina primary was an open primary, with the state awarding 88 delegates towards the 2000 Democratic National Convention, of which 72 were pledged delegates allocated on the basis of the results of the primary

Vice president and presumptive nominee Al Gore won the primary with more than 71% of the vote and all but ten delegates, which went to Senator Bill Bradley, who made the 15% threshold for statewide delegates with 21%. Gore became the presumptive nominee for the Democratic nomination about two months prior, but even then Bradley secured a small amount of protest vote.

== Procedure ==
Indiana's Democratic primary took place on May 2, 2000, the same date as the North Carolina primary and the D.C. Primary.

Voting took place throughout the state from 6 a.m. until 6 p.m. local time. Candidates had to meet a threshold of 15% at the congressional district or statewide level to be considered viable. The 72 pledged delegates to the 2000 Democratic National Convention were allocated proportionally on the basis of the primary results. Of these, between 5 and 8 were allocated to each of the state's 10 congressional districts and another 9 were allocated to party leaders and elected officials (PLEO delegates), in addition to 16 at-large delegates.

The state convention to designate the district-level national convention delegates was planned for June 11. The district delegates then voted on the 18 at-large and 9 pledged PLEO delegates for the Democratic National Convention. The delegation also included 14 unpledged PLEO delegates: 8 members of the Democratic National Committee, 5 members from Congress, those being 1 Senator (Evan Bayh), and 4 Representatives (Pete Visclosky, Tim Roemer, Baron Hill, and Julia Carson), the governor Frank O'Bannon, and 2 add-ons.

Pledged national convention delegates
Type	Del.	Type	Del.
CD1	-	CD6	-
CD2	-	CD7	-
CD3	-	CD8	-
CD4	-	CD9	-
CD5	-	CD10	-
PLEO	9	At-large	16
Total pledged delegates			82

== Candidates ==
The following candidates appeared on the ballot:

- Al Gore
- Lyndon LaRouche Jr.

Withdrawn

- Bill Bradley

== Results ==
2000 Indiana Democratic presidential primary
Candidate	Votes	%	Delegates
Al Gore	219,604	74.91	62
Bill Bradley (withdrawn)	64,339	21.95	10
Lyndon LaRouche Jr.	9,229	3.15	
Uncommitted	-	-	16
Total	293,172	100%	88
