= 2000 New Mexico Democratic presidential primary =

- June 6, 2000

35 delegates to the Democratic National Convention (26 pledged, 9 unpledged) The number of pledged delegates received is determined by the popular vote

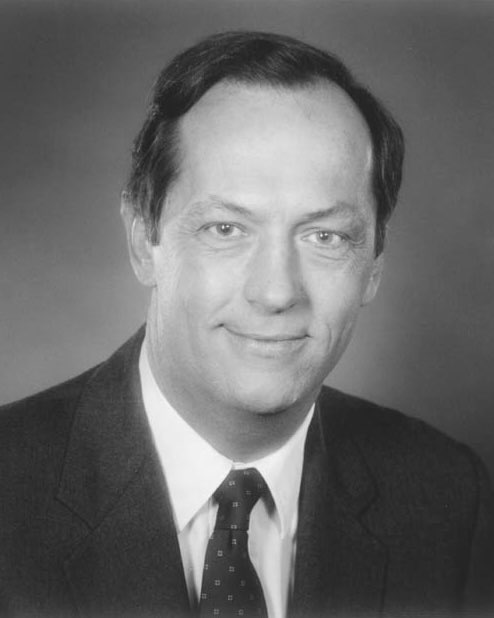
Candidate	Al Gore	Bill Bradley (withdrawn)
Home state	Tennessee	New Jersey
Delegate count	23	3
Popular vote	98,715	27,204
Percentage	74.63%	20.57%
- Primary results by county Gore: 50–60% 60–70% 70–80% 80–90% Bradley: 50–60%

The 2000 New Mexico Democratic presidential primary took place on June 6, 2000, as one of five final primaries on the same day in the Democratic Party primaries for the 2000 presidential election. The New Mexico primary was a closed primary, with the state awarding 35 delegates to the 2000 Democratic National Convention, of whom 26 were pledged delegates allocated on the basis of the primary results.

Vice president and presumptive nominee Al Gore won the primary with roughly 74% of the vote and won 23 delegates, helping him solidify his presumptive nomination over Bill Bradley, who had suspended his campaign three months earlier, narrowly passed the threshold of 15% and received 3 delegates, while Lyndon LaRouche Jr. and Uncommitted ballot option received roughly 2% respectively.

== Procedure ==
New Mexico was one of five states that voted on June 6, 2000, in the Democratic primaries, along with Alabama, Montana, New Jersey, New Mexico, and South Dakota.

Voting took place throughout the state from 7 a.m. until 7 p.m. In the closed primary, candidates had to meet a threshold of 15% at the congressional district or statewide level in order to be considered viable. The 26 pledged delegates to the 2000 Democratic National Convention were allocated proportionally on the basis of the primary results. Of these, between 5 and 7 were allocated to each of the state's 3 congressional districts and another 3 were allocated to party leaders and elected officials (PLEO delegates), in addition to 6 at-large delegates.

The delegation also included 8 unpledged PLEO delegates: 5 members of the Democratic National Committee, 2 members of Congress (1 senator, Jeff Bingaman, and 1 representative, Tom Udall), 1 distinguished party leader, and 1 add on.

Pledged national convention delegates
Type	Del.
CD1	5
CD2	5
CD3	7
PLEO	3
At-large	6
Total pledged delegates	26

== Candidates ==
The following candidates appeared on the ballot:

Running

- Al Gore
- Lyndon LaRouche Jr.

Withdrawn

- Bill Bradley

There was also an uncommitted option.

== Results ==
2000 New Mexico Democratic presidential primary
Candidate	Votes	%	Delegates
Al Gore	98,715	74.63	23
Bill Bradley (withdrawn)	27,204	20.57	3
Uncommitted	3,298	2.49	9
Lyndon LaRouche Jr.	3,063	2.32	
Total	132,280	100%	35

Gore won all of the state's congressional districts and all counties except Catron County.
