= 2000 Oklahoma Democratic presidential primary =

- March 14, 2000

52 delegates to the Democratic National Convention (45 pledged, 7 unpledged) The number of pledged delegates received is determined by the popular vote

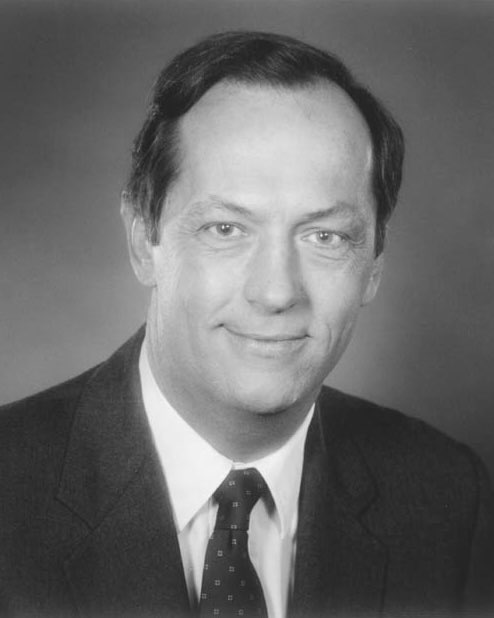

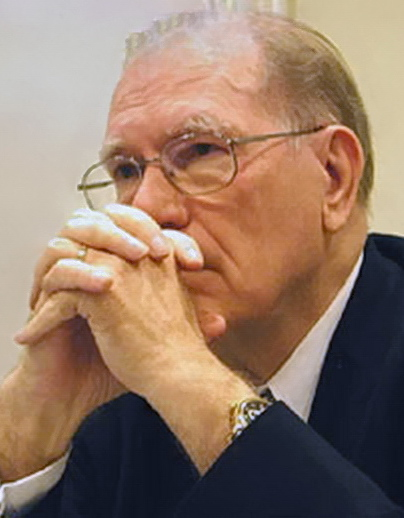
Candidate	Al Gore	Bill Bradley (withdrawn)	Lyndon LaRouche, Jr.
Home state	Tennessee	New Jersey	Virginia
Delegate count	38	7	0
Popular vote	92,654	34,311	7,885
Percentage	68.71%	25.44%	5.85%
- County results Gore: 50–60% 60–70% 70–80% Bradley: 40–50%

The 2000 Oklahoma Democratic presidential primary took place on March 14, 2000, as one of 6 contests scheduled the week after Super Tuesday in the Democratic Party primaries for the 2000 presidential election, following the Nevada caucuses the weekend before. The Oklahoma primary was a semi-closed primary, with the state awarding 52 delegates towards the 2000 Democratic National Convention, of which 45 were pledged delegates allocated on the basis of the results of the primary.

Vice president Al Gore won another southern primary by a large margin with almost 69% of the vote and 38 delegates, while senator Bill Bradley placed second with around 25% and 7 delegates despite having ended his presidential campaign the previous week. Lyndon LaRouche, Jr. did not reach the threshold and earned no delegates.

== Procedure ==
Oklahoma was one of six states which held primaries on March 14, 2000, alongside Florida, Louisiana, Mississippi, Tennessee, and Texas after Super Tuesday the week before.

Voting took place throughout the state from 7:00 a.m. until 7:00 p.m. In the semi-closed primary, candidates had to meet a threshold of 15 percent at the congressional district or statewide level in order to be considered viable. The 42 pledged delegates to the 2000 Democratic National Convention were allocated proportionally on the basis of the results of the primary. Of these, between 4 and 6 were allocated to each of the state's 6 congressional districts and another 6 were allocated to party leaders and elected officials (PLEO delegates), in addition to 10 at-large delegates.

The state convention was subsequently held to vote on the national convention delegates. The state delegation also included 6 unpledged PLEO delegates: 5 members of the Democratic National Committee and 1 add-on.

Pledged national convention delegates
Type	Del.
CD1	5
CD2	4
CD3	5
CD4	6
CD5	4
CD6	5
PLEO	6
At-large	10
Total pledged delegates	45

== Candidates ==
The following candidates appeared on the ballot:

- Al Gore
- Lyndon LaRouche, Jr.

Withdrawn

- Bill Bradley

== Results ==
2000 Oklahoma Democratic presidential primary
Candidate	Votes	%	Delegates
Al Gore	92,654	68.71	38
Bill Bradley (withdrawn)	34,311	25.44	7
Lyndon LaRouche, Jr.	7,885	5.85	
Uncommitted	-	-	7
Total	134,850	100%	52

=== Results by county ===
2000 Oklahoma Democratic presidential primary (results by county)
County	Al Gore		Bill Bradley		Lyndon LaRouche		Total votes cast
County	Votes	%	Votes	%	Votes	%	Total votes cast
Adair	419	71.26%	127	21.60%	42	7.14%	588
Alfalfa	205	66.99%	78	25.49%	23	7.52%	306
Atoka	406	66.02%	154	25.04%	55	8.94%	615
Beaver	86	42.79%	93	46.27%	22	10.95%	201
Beckham	568	71.27%	168	21.08%	61	7.65%	797
Blaine	277	65.80%	118	28.03%	26	6.18%	421
Bryan	847	70.06%	291	24.07%	71	5.87%	1,209
Caddo	840	69.02%	306	25.14%	71	5.83%	1,217
Canadian	1,448	60.79%	743	31.19%	191	8.02%	2,382
Carter	1,088	66.59%	437	26.74%	109	6.67%	1,634
Cherokee	849	73.13%	251	21.62%	61	5.25%	1,161
Choctaw	998	69.07%	325	22.49%	122	8.44%	1,445
Cimarron	111	43.02%	119	46.12%	28	10.85%	258
Cleveland	3,480	64.11%	1,585	29.20%	363	6.69%	5,428
Coal	264	68.04%	89	22.94%	35	9.02%	388
Comanche	3,149	69.30%	1,132	24.91%	263	5.79%	4,544
Cotton	291	67.52%	114	26.45%	26	6.03%	431
Craig	475	72.96%	144	22.12%	32	4.92%	651
Creek	2,198	69.29%	810	25.54%	164	5.17%	3,172
Custer	639	65.61%	256	26.28%	79	8.11%	974
Delaware	1,756	64.94%	763	28.22%	185	6.84%	2,704
Dewey	222	57.51%	134	34.72%	30	7.77%	386
Ellis	149	61.83%	71	29.46%	21	8.71%	241
Garfield	964	72.92%	305	23.07%	53	4.01%	1,322
Garvin	946	68.30%	337	24.33%	102	7.36%	1,385
Grady	1,204	63.94%	561	29.79%	118	6.27%	1,883
Grant	202	67.11%	75	24.92%	24	7.97%	301
Greer	230	58.23%	138	34.94%	27	6.84%	395
Harmon	177	71.37%	60	24.19%	11	4.44%	248
Harper	148	62.71%	72	30.51%	16	6.78%	236
Haskell	374	73.62%	105	20.67%	29	5.71%	508
Hughes	477	73.27%	135	20.74%	39	5.99%	651
Jackson	754	63.31%	338	28.38%	99	8.31%	1,191
Jefferson	318	66.67%	135	28.30%	24	5.03%	477
Johnston	414	64.69%	175	27.34%	51	7.97%	640
Kay	1,307	70.04%	462	24.76%	97	5.20%	1,866
Kingfisher	310	64.32%	136	28.22%	36	7.47%	482
Kiowa	380	60.80%	199	31.84%	46	7.36%	625
Latimer	430	72.88%	127	21.53%	33	5.59%	590
LeFlore	1,252	69.59%	421	23.40%	126	7.00%	1,799
Lincoln	791	67.90%	285	24.46%	89	7.64%	1,165
Logan	740	69.22%	262	24.51%	67	6.27%	1,069
Love	318	69.28%	111	24.18%	30	6.54%	459
McClain	595	63.16%	262	27.81%	85	9.02%	942
McCurtain	491	54.31%	296	32.74%	117	12.94%	904
McIntosh	811	73.93%	244	22.24%	42	3.83%	1,097
Major	181	67.04%	72	26.67%	17	6.30%	270
Marshall	544	65.70%	244	29.47%	40	4.83%	828
Mayes	1,341	72.45%	413	22.31%	97	5.24%	1,851
Murray	487	65.81%	198	26.76%	55	7.43%	740
Muskogee	2,164	75.16%	577	20.04%	138	4.79%	2,879
Noble	318	65.84%	126	26.09%	39	8.07%	483
Nowata	358	72.32%	108	21.82%	29	5.86%	495
Okfuskee	438	71.57%	133	21.73%	41	6.70%	612
Oklahoma	16,347	67.61%	6,483	26.81%	1,350	5.58%	24,180
Okmulgee	1,311	74.96%	366	20.93%	72	4.12%	1,749
Osage	1,656	75.24%	454	20.63%	91	4.13%	2,201
Ottawa	860	75.17%	225	19.67%	59	5.16%	1,144
Pawnee	441	73.26%	136	22.59%	25	4.15%	602
Payne	2,210	66.57%	947	28.52%	163	4.91%	3,320
Pittsburg	2,989	65.48%	1,220	26.73%	356	7.80%	4,565
Pontotoc	886	67.48%	331	25.21%	96	7.31%	1,313
Pottawatomie	1,478	65.75%	617	27.45%	153	6.81%	2,248
Pushmataha	468	59.47%	230	29.22%	89	11.31%	787
Roger Mills	152	54.48%	99	35.48%	28	10.04%	279
Rogers	1,827	67.82%	712	26.43%	155	5.75%	2,694
Seminole	581	68.76%	207	24.50%	57	6.75%	845
Sequoyah	1,032	69.12%	359	24.05%	102	6.83%	1,493
Stephens	1,384	67.48%	529	25.79%	138	6.73%	2,051
Texas	320	54.15%	222	37.56%	49	8.29%	591
Tillman	320	65.71%	135	27.72%	32	6.57%	487
Tulsa	14,723	74.69%	4,321	21.92%	669	3.39%	19,713
Wagoner	1,136	68.47%	420	25.32%	103	6.21%	1,659
Washington	1,035	71.48%	334	23.07%	79	5.46%	1,448
Washita	548	59.44%	302	32.75%	72	7.81%	922
Woods	298	72.51%	91	22.14%	22	5.35%	411
Woodward	423	70.27%	151	25.08%	28	4.65%	602
Total	92,654	68.71%	34,311	25.44%	7,885	5.85%	134,850
