= 2000 Kentucky Democratic presidential primary =

- May 23, 2000

58 delegates to the Democratic National Convention (49 pledged, 9 unpledged) The number of pledged delegates received is determined by the popular vote

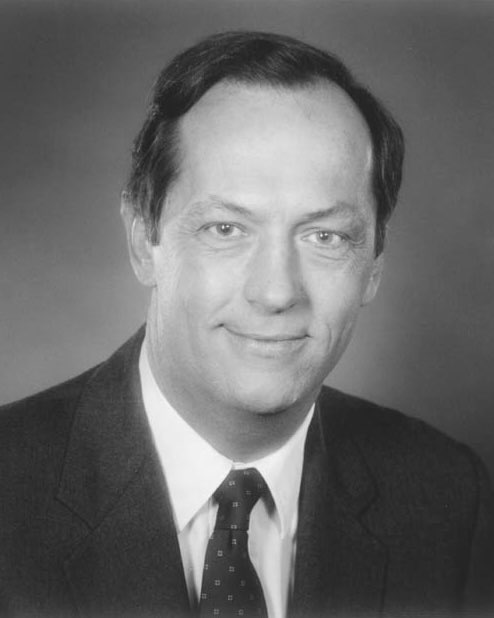

Candidate	Al Gore	Bill Bradley (withdrawn)	Uncommitted
Home state	Tennessee	New Jersey	n/a
Delegate count	46	3	0
Popular vote	156,966	32,340	26,046
Percentage	71.26%	14.68%	11.82%
- Primary results by county Gore: 50–60% 60–70% 70–80% 80–90%

Pledged national convention delegates
Type	Del.
CD1	5
CD2	5
CD3	8
CD4	4
CD5	5
CD6	5
PLEO	6
At-large	11
Total pledged delegates	49

The 2000 Kentucky Democratic presidential primary took place on May 23, 2000, alongside the Arkansas primary and the non-binding Idaho Presidential Preference primary, as part of the Democratic Party primaries for the 2000 presidential election. The Kentucky primary was a closed primary, with the state awarding 58 delegates to the 2000 Democratic National Convention, of whom 49 were pledged delegates allocated on the basis of the primary results.

Presumptive nominee and vice president Al Gore handily won the primary with almost 72% of the vote but not all of the 54 delegates. Senator Bill Bradley, despite withdrawing in March, received almost 15% of the vote, winning just 3 delegates. The option for uncommitted delegates caught up almost 12% but did not receive enough votes to allocate uncommitted delegates from the district level. Lyndon LaRouche Jr. amassed just 2% of the vote and won no delegates.

== Procedure ==
Kentucky was one of three states to vote on May 23, 2000, in the Democratic primaries, along with Arkansas and Idaho, which was non-binding and did not have any effect on the nomination.

The polls were originally scheduled to be open from 6:00 a.m. until 6:00 p.m. local time. In the closed primary, candidates had to meet a threshold of 15 percent at the congressional district or statewide level in order to be considered viable. The 49 pledged delegates to the 2000 Democratic National Convention were allocated proportionally on the basis of the results of the primary. Of these, between 4 and 8 were allocated to each of the state's 6 congressional districts and another 6 were allocated to party leaders and elected officials (PLEO delegates), in addition to 11 at-large delegates.

The delegation also included 8 unpledged PLEO delegates: 6 members of the Democratic National Committee, one representative from Congress, Ken Lucas, and Governor Paul Patton.

== Candidates ==
The following candidates appeared on the ballot:

- Al Gore
- Lyndon LaRouche Jr.

Withdrawn

- Bill Bradley

There was also an uncommitted option.

== Results ==
2000 Kentucky Democratic presidential primary
Candidate	Votes	%	Delegates
Al Gore	156,966	71.26	46
Bill Bradley (withdrawn)	32,340	14.68	3
Uncommitted	26,046	11.82	9
Lyndon LaRouche Jr.	4,927	2.24	
Total	220,279	100%	58
