= 2000 Idaho Democratic presidential caucuses =

- March 7, 2000

23 delegates to the Democratic National Convention

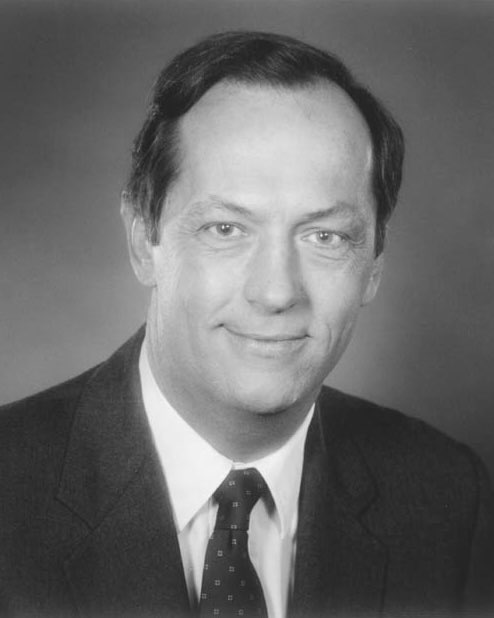
Candidate	Al Gore	Bill Bradley
Home state	Tennessee	New Jersey
Delegate count	14	4
Popular vote	240	126
Percentage	63%	33%

The 2000 Idaho Democratic presidential caucuses were held on March 7, 2000, as part of the 2000 Democratic Party primaries for the 2000 presidential election. 23 delegates to the 2000 Democratic National Convention were allocated to the presidential candidates, the contest was held on Super Tuesday alongside primaries and caucuses in 15 other states. Vice President Al Gore won the contest by taking all the delegates.

== Candidates ==
The following candidates achieved on the ballot:

- Al Gore
- Bill Bradley
- Uncommitted (voting option)

== Results ==
Idaho Democratic caucus, March 7, 2000
Candidate	Votes	Percentage	Actual delegate count		
Candidate	Votes	Percentage	Bound	Unbound	Total
AI Gore	240	63%	14		14
Bill Bradley	126	33%	4		4
Uncommitted (voting option)	16	4%	5		5
Total:	382	100%	23		23

== See also ==
- 2000 United States presidential election in Idaho
- 2000 United States presidential election
- 2000 Democratic Party presidential primaries
- 2000 Idaho Democratic presidential primary
