= 2000 Pennsylvania Democratic presidential primary =

- April 4, 2000

191 delegates to the Democratic National Convention (160 pledged, 31 unpledged) The number of pledged delegates received is determined by the popular vote

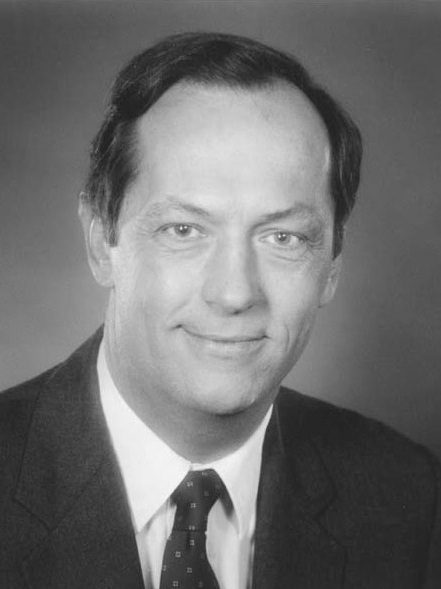
Candidate	Al Gore	Bill Bradley (withdrawn)
Home state	Tennessee	New Jersey
Delegate count	139	21
Popular vote	525,306	146,797
Percentage	74.20%	20.73%
- County results Gore: 60–70% 70–80% 80–90%

The 2000 Pennsylvania Democratic presidential primary took place on April 4, 2000, as one of two primaries on the same day in the Democratic primaries for the 2000 United States presidential election. The Pennsylvania primary was a closed primary, with the state awarding 191 delegates, of whom 186 were pledged delegates allocated on the basis of the primary results.

Vice president and presumptive nominee Al Gore won the primary with more than 74% of the vote, earning another 139 delegates and helping him to cross the necessary majority of 1,991 delegates and officially win the Democratic nomination. Senator Bill Bradley, who had suspended his campaign one month earlier, received around 20% of the vote and 21 delegates, even without actively campaigning.

== Procedure ==
Pennsylvania's Democratic primary took place on April 4, 2000, the same date as the Wisconsin primary.

Voting took place throughout the state from 7:00 a.m. until 8:00 p.m. In the closed primary, candidates had to meet a threshold of 15% at the congressional district or statewide level in order to be considered viable. The 160 pledged delegates to the 2000 Democratic National Convention were allocated proportionally on the basis of the results of the primary. Of these, between 4 and 7 were allocated to each of the state's 21 congressional districts and another 21 were allocated to party leaders and elected officials (PLEO delegates), in addition to 35 at-large delegates.

Voters chose district-level national convention delegates during the presidential primary, with no need for an additional confirmation by party bodies. If a presidential candidate listed fewer district delegate candidates for the national convention than had to be allocated based on the results of the primary, then the additional delegates would be named at the subsequent state convention. The state convention voted on the 41 at-large and 20 pledged PLEO delegates for the national convention. The delegation also included 28 unpledged PLEO delegates: 17 members of the Democratic National Committee, 11 members of Congress (11 representatives, Bob Brady, Chaka Fattah, Robert Borski, Ron Klink, Tim Holden, Paul Kanjorski, John Murtha, Joe Hoeffel, William Coyne, Mike Doyle, and Frank Mascara), and three add-ons.

Pledged national convention delegates
Type	Del.	Type	Del.
CD1	6	CD12	5
CD2	7	CD13	5
CD3	5	CD14	6
CD4	5	CD15	5
CD5	4	CD16	4
CD6	4	CD17	4
CD7	5	CD18	6
CD8	5	CD19	4
CD9	4	CD20	5
CD10	5	CD21	5
CD11	5	CD21	5
PLEO	21	At-large	35
Total pledged delegates			160

== Candidates ==
The following candidates appeared on the ballot:

- Al Gore
- Lyndon LaRouche Jr.

Withdrawn

- Bill Bradley

There was also an Uncommitted option.

== Results ==
2000 Pennsylvania Democratic presidential primary
Candidate	Votes	%	Delegates
Al Gore	525,306	74.20	139
Bill Bradley (withdrawn)	146,797	20.73	21
Lyndon LaRouche Jr.	32,047	4.53	
Write-in votes	3,840	0.54	
Uncommitted	-	-	31
Total	704,150	100%	160
