= 2000 Texas Democratic presidential primary =

- March 14, 2000

231 delegates to the Democratic National Convention (194 pledged, 37 unpledged) The number of pledged delegates received is determined by the popular vote

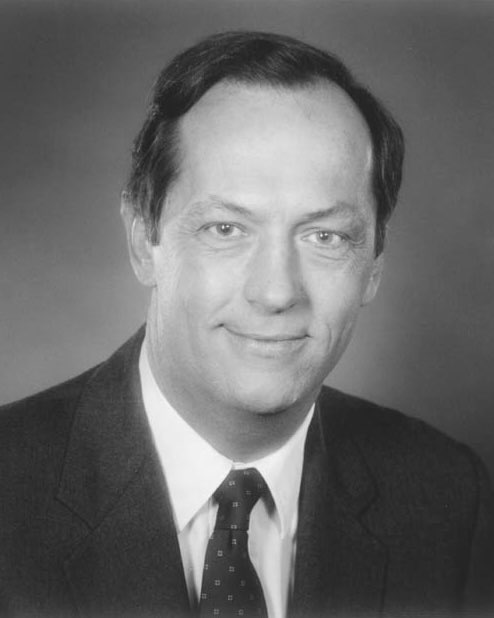
Candidate	Al Gore	Bill Bradley (withdrawn)
Home state	Tennessee	New Jersey
Delegate count	182	12
Popular vote	631,428	128,564
Percentage	80.24%	16.34%
- Primary results by county Gore: 40–50% 50–60% 60–70% 70–80% 80–90% 90–100% Bradley: 40–50% 50–60% Tie: 40–50% No votesː

The 2000 Texas Democratic presidential primary took place on March 14, 2000, as one of 6 contests scheduled on the week following Super Tuesday in the Democratic Party primaries for the 2000 presidential election, following the Nevada caucuses the weekend before. The Texas primary was an open primary, with the state awarding one the largest amounts of national convention delegates on Mini Tuesday and third-largest amount overall: 231 delegates, of which 194 were pledged delegates allocated on the basis of the primary.

Vice president Al Gore easily won the primary, winning over 80% of the vote and 182 delegates. Senator Bill Bradley took 16% of the vote and earned 12 delegates, while Lyndon LaRouche Jr. only got 3% of the vote.

== Procedure ==
Texas was one of six states which held primaries on March 14, 2000, alongside Florida, Louisiana, Mississippi, Oklahoma, and Tennessee after Super Tuesday the week before.

Voting took place throughout the state from 7:00 a.m. until 7:00 p.m. local time. In the primary, candidates had to meet a threshold of 15 percent at the state senatorial district or statewide level in order to be considered viable (Texas was the only state to choose districts from state senate elections over congressional districts for delegate distribution). The 194 pledged delegates to the 2000 Democratic National Convention were allocated proportionally on the basis of the results of the primary. Of these, between 2 and 7 were allocated to each of the state's 31 state senatorial districts based on their level of support for the Democratic nominees for president in 1996 and Governor in 1998, and another 25 allocated to party leaders and elected officials (PLEO delegates), in addition to 42 at-large delegates.

After precinct, county, and senatorial district conventions during which delegates to the state convention were nominated, the state convention was subsequently held on June 10, 2000, to vote on the 42 at-large and 25 pledged PLEO delegates for the Democratic National Convention. The delegation also included 34 unpledged PLEO delegates: 15 members of the Democratic National Committee, 17 representatives from Congress (Max Sandlin, Jim Turner, Ralph Hall, Nick Lampson, Lloyd Doggett, Chet Edwards, Rubén Hinojosa, Silvestre Reyes, Charles Stenholm, Sheila Jackson Lee, Henry González, Martin Frost, Ken Bentsen, Solomon Ortiz, Ciro Rodriguez, Gene Green, and Eddie Bernice Johnson), 2 distinguished party leaders, and 3 add-ons.

Pledged national convention delegates
Type	Del.	Type	Del.	Type	Del.
SD1	5	SD12	5	SD23	5
SD2	4	SD13	7	SD24	3
SD3	5	SD14	7	SD25	4
SD4	5	SD15	4	SD26	4
SD5	4	SD16	3	SD27	4
SD6	3	SD17	4	SD28	3
SD7	3	SD18	4	SD29	4
SD8	3	SD19	4	SD30	4
SD9	3	SD20	5	SD31	2
SD10	4	SD21	4	PLEO	30
SD11	4	SD22	4	At-large	42
Total pledged delegates					194

== Candidates ==
The following candidates appeared on the ballot:

- Al Gore
- Lyndon LaRouche Jr.

Withdrawn

- Bill Bradley

== Results ==
2000 Texas Democratic presidential primary
Candidate	Votes	%	Delegates
Al Gore	631,428	80.24	182
Bill Bradley (withdrawn)	128,564	16.34	12
Lyndon LaRouche Jr.	26,898	3.42	
Uncommitted	-	-	37
Total	786,890	100%	231
