= 2000 Wisconsin Democratic presidential primary =

- April 4, 2000

93 delegates to the Democratic National Convention (77 pledged, 16 unpledged) The number of pledged delegates received is determined by the popular vote

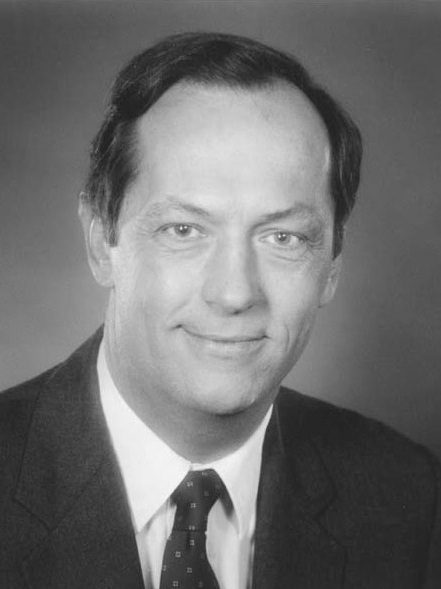
Candidate	Al Gore	Bill Bradley (withdrawn)
Home state	Tennessee	New Jersey
Delegate count	77	0
Popular vote	328,682	32,560
Percentage	88.55%	8.77%
- County results Gore: 80–90% 90–100%

Pledged national convention delegates
Type	Del.
CD1	5
CD2	6
CD3	6
CD4	6
CD5	6
CD6	5
CD7	6
CD8	5
CD9	5
PLEO	10
At-large	17
Total pledged delegates	77

The 2000 Wisconsin Democratic presidential primary took place on April 4, 2000 as part of the Democratic Party primaries for the 2000 presidential election. The Wisconsin primary was an open primary, with the state awarding 93 delegates to the 2000 Democratic National Convention, of which 77 were pledged delegates allocated on the basis of the results of the primary.

As of the primary on April 4, Vice president Al Gore and conspiracy theorist Lyndon LaRouche Jr. were the only candidates left in the race. Bradley had dropped out and suspended his campaign the previous month, leaving Gore as the party's presumed presidential nominee. Nevertheless, Bradley continued to gain delegates at the national convention in subsequent later primary contests, but did not make the threshold in Wisconsin. Gore had ultimately won the primary with around 88% of the vote and all 77 pledged delegates, while Bradley, only received around 10% of the vote and 0 delegates.

== Procedure ==
Wisconsin's Democratic primary took place on April 4, 2000, the same date as the Pennsylvania primary.

Voting took place throughout the state from 7:00 a.m. until 8:00 p.m. In the open primary, candidates had to meet a threshold of 15% at the congressional district or statewide level in order to be considered viable. The 77 pledged delegates to the 2000 Democratic National Convention were allocated proportionally on the basis of the results of the primary. Of these, between 5 and 6 were allocated to each of the state's 9 congressional districts and another 10 were allocated to party leaders and elected officials (PLEO delegates), in addition to 17 at-large delegates.

The remaining 15 National Convention delegates consist of 13 Unpledged PLEOs and 2 Unpledged "add-on's"; these 15 delegates will go to the Democratic National Convention officially "unpledged." The delegation included 13 unpledged PLEO delegates: 6 members of the Democratic National Committee, 7 members of Congress (two senators, Russ Feingold and Herb Kohl, and 5 representatives, Tammy Baldwin, Ron Kind, Jerry Kleczka, Tom Barrett, and Dave Obey), and two add-on's.

== Candidates ==
The following candidates appeared on the ballot:

- Al Gore
- Lyndon LaRouche Jr.

Withdrawn

- Bill Bradley

There was also an Uncommitted option.

== Results ==
2000 Wisconsin Democratic presidential primary
Candidate	Votes	%	Delegates
Al Gore	328,682	88.55	77
Bill Bradley (withdrawn)	32,560	8.77	
Uncommitted	4,105	1.11	16
Lyndon LaRouche Jr.	3,743	1.01	
Write-in votes	2,106	0.57	
Total	371,196	100%	93
