= 2000 Utah Democratic presidential primary =

- March 10, 2000

29 delegates to the Democratic National Convention (24 pledged, 5 unpledged) The number of pledged delegates received is determined by the popular vote

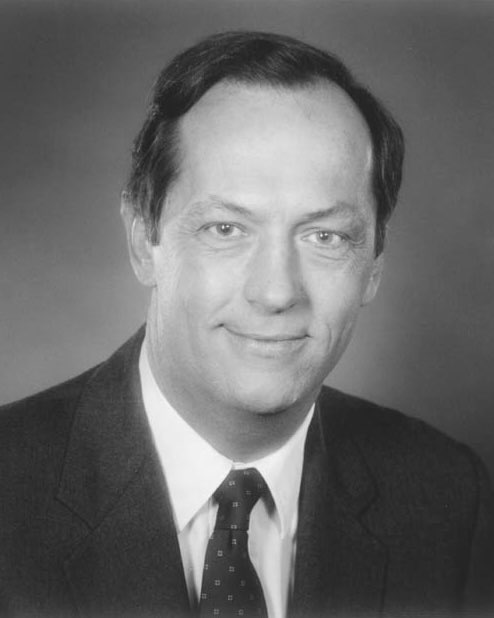
Candidate	Al Gore	Bill Bradley (withdrawn)
Home state	Tennessee	New Jersey
Delegate count	21	3
Popular vote	12,527	3,160
Percentage	79.86%	20.14%
- Primary results by county Gore: 50–60% 60–70% 70–80% 80–90%

The 2000 Utah Democratic presidential primary took place on March 14, 2000, as one of two contests scheduled for the Democratic Party primaries for the 2000 presidential election, following the South Carolina caucuses the day before. The Utah primary was an open primary, with any registered voter able to participate. The primary awarded 29 delegates towards the 2000 Democratic National Convention, of which 24 were pledged delegates allocated on the basis of the results of the primary.

Continuing from his wins on Super Tuesday, Vice president Al Gore placed first by a large margin with around 79% of the vote and won 21 delegates, while Senator Bill Bradley came in second with around 20% and 3 delegates, after withdrawing the night before.

== Procedure ==
Utah was one of two states that held primaries on March 10, 2000, along with Colorado.

Voting took place throughout the state from 7:00 a.m. until 8:00 p.m. In the primary, candidates had to meet a threshold of 15 percent at the congressional district or statewide level in order to be considered viable. The 24 pledged delegates to the 2000 Democratic National Convention were allocated proportionally on the basis of the results of the primary. Of these, between 5 and 6 were allocated to each of the state's 3 congressional districts and another 4 were allocated to party leaders and elected officials (PLEO delegates), in addition to 6 at-large delegates.

The convention voted on national convention district delegates via delegates from a specific district, those national convention district delegates than voted on the 4 pledged PLEO delegates, and the state convention finally voted on the 6 at-large delegates for the national convention. The delegation also included 5 unpledged PLEO delegates: 4 members of the Democratic National Committee and 1 add-on.

Pledged national convention delegates
Type	Del.
CD1	5
CD2	6
CD3	5
PLEO	3
At-large	5
Total pledged delegates	24

== Candidates ==
The following candidates appeared on the ballot:

- Al Gore
- Lyndon LaRouche Jr.

Withdrawn

- Bill Bradley

There was also an uncommitted option.

== Results ==
2000 Utah Democratic presidential primary
Candidate	Votes	%	Delegates
Al Gore	12,527	79.86	21
Bill Bradley (withdrawn)	3,160	20.14	3
Uncommitted	-	-	5
Total	15,687	100%	29
