= 2000 Colorado Democratic presidential primary =

- March 10, 2000

61 delegates to the Democratic National Convention (51 pledged, 10 unpledged) The number of pledged delegates received is determined by the popular vote

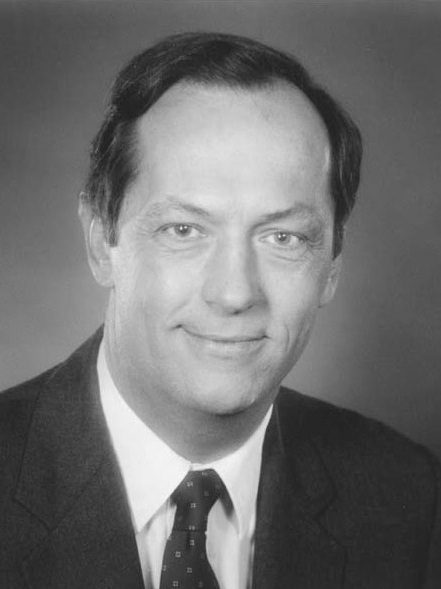
Candidate	Al Gore	Bill Bradley (withdrawn)
Home state	Tennessee	New Jersey
Delegate count	44	7
Popular vote	63,384	20,663
Percentage	71.43%	23.29%
- Primary results by county Gore: 30–40% 50–60% 60–70% 70–80% 80–90%

Pledged national convention delegates
Type	Del.
CD1	6
CD2	6
CD3	6
CD4	5
CD5	5
CD6	5
PLEO	7
At-large	11
Total pledged delegates	51

The 2000 Colorado Democratic presidential primary took place on March 10, 2000, as one of two contests scheduled on the weekend following Super Tuesday in the Democratic Party primaries for the 2000 presidential election, following the South Carolina caucuses the day before. The Colorado primary, the first in the state since 2000, was a semi-closed primary and awarded 61 delegates towards the 2000 Democratic National Convention, of which 51 were pledged delegates allocated on the basis of the results of the primary.

Vice president Al Gore won the primary with 71% of the vote and ultimately received 44 delegates, ahead of Senator Bill Bradley, who won roughly 23% and received 7 delegates, after withdrawing the night before. The option for Uncommitted received 4% of the vote and conspiracy theorist Lyndon LaRouche Jr. received just under 1%.

== Procedure ==
Colorado was one of two states that held primaries on March 10, 2000, along with Utah.

Voting took place throughout the state until 7:00 p.m. In the semi-closed primary, candidates had to meet a threshold of 15 percent at the congressional district or statewide level in order to be considered viable. The 61 pledged delegates to the 2000 Democratic National Convention were allocated proportionally on the basis of the results of the primary. Of these, between 5 and 7 were allocated to each of the state's 6 congressional districts and another 7 were allocated to party leaders and elected officials (PLEO delegates), in addition to 11 at-large delegates.

The state convention voted on the 11 at-large and 7 pledged PLEO delegates for the Democratic National Convention. The delegation also included 12 unpledged PLEO delegates: 6 members of the Democratic National Committee, 2 members of Congress (Diana DeGette and Mark Udall), 1 distinguished party leader, and 1 add-on.

== Candidates ==
The following candidates appeared on the ballot:

- Al Gore
- Lyndon LaRouche Jr.

Withdrawn

- Bill Bradley

There was also an uncommitted option.

== Results ==
2000 Colorado Democratic presidential primary
Candidate	Votes	%	Delegates
Al Gore	63,384	71.43	44
Bill Bradley (withdrawn)	20,663	23.29	7
Uncommitted	3,867	4.36	10
Lyndon LaRouche Jr.	821	0.93	
Total	88,735	100%	61
