= 2000 Tennessee Democratic presidential primary =

- March 14, 2000

81 delegates to the Democratic National Convention (68 pledged, 13 unpledged) The number of pledged delegates received is determined by the popular vote

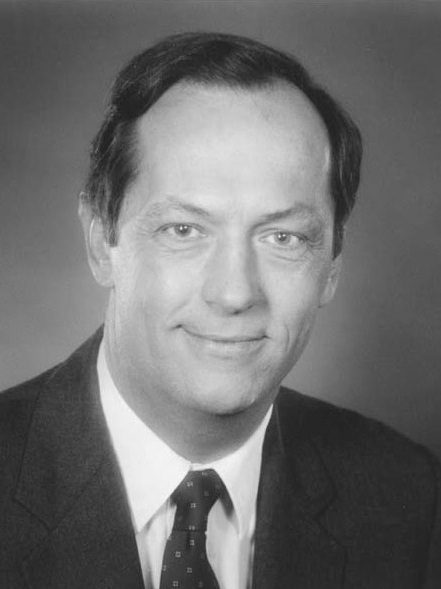
Candidate	Al Gore	Bill Bradley (withdrawn)
Home state	Tennessee	New Jersey
Delegate count	68	0
Popular vote	198,264	11,323
Percentage	92.13%	5.26%
- County results Gore: 70–80% 80–90% 90–100%

Pledged national convention delegates
Type	Del.	Type	Del.
CD1	3	CD6	5
CD2	5	CD7	4
CD3	5	CD8	5
CD4	4	CD9	7
CD5	6	CD9	7
PLEO	9	At-large	15
Total pledged delegates			68

The 2000 Tennessee Democratic presidential primary took place on March 14, 2000, as one of 6 contests scheduled the following week after Super Tuesday in the Democratic Party primaries for the 2000 presidential election, following the Nevada caucuses the weekend before. The Tennessee primary was an open primary, with the state awarding 81 delegates towards the 2000 Democratic National Convention, of which 68 were pledged delegates allocated on the basis of the results of the primary.

Vice president Al Gore easily decided the primary in his home state, winning 92.1% of the vote and all 68 delegates. Senator Bill Bradley took only 5.3% of the vote and earned 0 delegates, while Lyndon LaRouche Jr. only got 0.5% of the vote.

== Procedure ==
Tennessee was one of six states which held primaries on March 14, 2000, alongside Florida, Louisiana, Mississippi, Oklahoma, and Texas after Super Tuesday the week before.

Voting was expected to take place throughout the state from 7:00 a.m. until 8:00 p.m. in the parts of the state in the Eastern Time Zone, and from 8:00 a.m. to 7:00 p.m. in parts of the state in the Central Time Zone.

In the open primary, candidates had to meet a threshold of 15 percent at the congressional district or statewide level in order to be considered viable. The 68 pledged delegates to the 2000 Democratic National Convention were allocated proportionally on the basis of the results of the primary. Of these, between 3 and 7 were allocated to each of the state's 9 congressional districts and another 9 were allocated to party leaders and elected officials (PLEO delegates), in addition to 15 at-large delegates.

Afterwards, the state executive committee convened to vote on the 15 at-large and 9 pledged PLEO delegates for the Democratic National Convention. The delegation also included 12 unpledged PLEO delegates: 7 members of the Democratic National Committee, 4 representatives from Congress (Bob Clement, Bart Gordon, John Tanner, and Harold Ford Jr.), 1 distinguished party leader, that being Vice president Al Gore himself, and 1 add-on.

== Candidates ==
The following candidates appeared on the ballot:

- Al Gore
- Lyndon LaRouche Jr.

Withdrawn

- Bill Bradley

There was also an Uncommitted option.

== Results ==
2000 Tennessee Democratic presidential primary
Candidate	Votes	%	Delegates
Al Gore	198,264	92.13	68
Bill Bradley (withdrawn)	11,323	5.26	
Uncommitted	4,407	2.05	13
Lyndon LaRouche Jr.	1,031	0.48	
Write-in votes	178	0.08	
Total	215,203	100%	81

== See also ==
- 2000 Tennessee Republican presidential primary
- 2000 Democratic Party presidential primaries
- 2000 United States presidential election in Tennessee
- 2000 Tennessee elections
