= 2000 Florida Democratic presidential primary =

- March 14, 2000

186 delegates to the Democratic National Convention (161 pledged, 25 unpledged) The number of pledged delegates received is determined by the popular vote

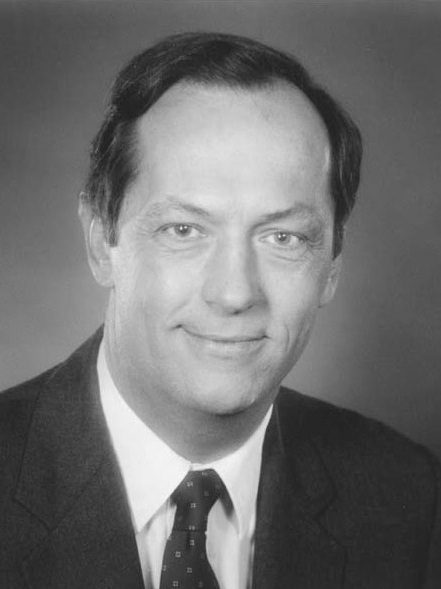
Candidate	Al Gore	Bill Bradley (withdrawn)
Home state	Tennessee	New Jersey
Delegate count	144	17
Popular vote	451,718	100,277
Percentage	81.83%	18.17%
- Primary results by county Gore: 50–60% 60–70% 70–80% 80–90% 90–100%

Pledged national convention delegates
Type	Del.	Type	Del.	Type	Del.
CD1	4	CD9	5	CD17	5
CD2	6	CD10	5	CD18	3
CD3	5	CD11	4	CD19	7
CD4	4	CD12	4	CD20	6
CD5	6	CD13	4	CD21	2
CD6	4	CD14	4	CD22	5
CD7	4	CD15	4	CD23	5
CD8	4	CD16	5	CD23	5
PLEO		21	At-large		35
Total pledged delegates					161

The 2000 Florida Democratic presidential primary took place on March 14, 2000, the second primary Tuesday of the primary season, as one of six states voting on the same day in the Democratic Party primaries for the 2000 presidential election. The Florida primary was a closed primary, with the state awarding the largest amount of delegates towards the 2000 Democratic National Convention with 186 delegates, of whom 161 were pledged delegates allocated on the basis of the primary results.

Vice president Al Gore was the clear winner of the Florida primary, receiving almost 82% of the vote and 144 delegates, winning every county in the state and significantly extending his delegate lead. Senator Bill Bradley placed second with only around 18% of the vote and 17 delegates.

== Procedure ==
Florida was one of six states which held primaries on March 14, 2000, alongside Louisiana, Mississippi, Oklahoma, Tennessee, and Texas after Super Tuesday the week before.

Voting took place throughout the state from 7:00 a.m. until 7:00 p.m. local time. In the closed primary, candidates had to meet a threshold of 15 percent at the congressional district or statewide level in order to be considered viable. The 186 pledged delegates to the 2000 Democratic National Convention were allocated proportionally on the basis of the results of the primary. Of these, between 2 and 7 were allocated to each of the state's 23 congressional districts and another 21 were allocated to party leaders and elected officials (PLEO delegates), in addition to 35 at-large delegates.

Post-primary congressional district caucuses convened to designate national convention district delegates. The state convention was subsequently held to vote on the 35 at-large and 21 pledged PLEO delegates for the Democratic National Convention. The delegation also included 22 unpledged PLEO delegates: 13 members of the Democratic National Committee, 9 members from Congress (1 senator, Bob Graham, and 8 representatives, Allen Boyd, Corrine Brown, Karen Thurman, Jim Davis, Carrie Meek, Robert Wexler, Peter Deutsch, and Alcee Hastings), and 3 add-ons.

== Candidates ==
The following candidates appeared on the ballot:

- Al Gore

Withdrawn

- Bill Bradley

== Results ==
2000 Florida Democratic presidential primary
Candidate	Votes	%	Delegates
Al Gore	451,718	81.83	144
Bill Bradley (withdrawn)	100,277	18.17	17
Uncommitted	-	-	25
Total	551,916	100%	186
