= 2000 Louisiana Democratic presidential primary =

- March 14, 2000

72 delegates to the Democratic National Convention (61 pledged, 11 unpledged) The number of pledged delegates received is determined by the popular vote

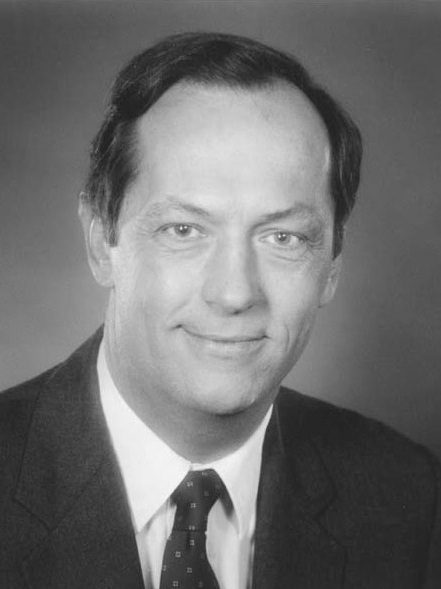
Candidate	Al Gore	Bill Bradley (withdrawn)
Home state	Tennessee	New Jersey
Delegate count	54	7
Popular vote	114,942	31,385
Percentage	72.96%	19.92%
- Parish results Gore: 50–60% 60–70% 70–80% 80–90%

Pledged national convention delegates
Type	Del.
CD1	4
CD2	8
CD3	7
CD4	5
CD5	5
CD6	6
CD7	5
PLEO	8
At-large	13
Total pledged delegates	61

The 2000 Louisiana Democratic presidential primary took place on March 14, 2000, in the Democratic Party primaries for the 2000 presidential election. The Louisiana primary was a closed primary, with the state awarding 72 delegates, of which 61 were pledged delegates allocated on the basis of the results of the primary.

Presumptive nominee and vice president Al Gore won nearly 73% of the vote and 54 delegates, while senator Bill Bradley only took just less than 20%, conspiracy theorist Lyndon LaRouche Jr. took close to 4% of the vote, while Randy Crow, a perennial candidate from North Carolina who was only on the ballot in this state, took the rest of the vote.

== Procedure ==
Louisiana was one of six states which held primaries on March 14, 2000, alongside Florida, Mississippi, Oklahoma, Tennessee, and Texas after Super Tuesday the week before.

Voting was expected to take place throughout the state from 6:00 a.m. until 8:00 p.m. In the closed primary, candidates had to meet a threshold of 15 percent at the congressional district or statewide level in order to be considered viable. The 61 pledged delegates to the 2000 Democratic National Convention were allocated proportionally on the basis of the results of the primary. Of these, between 4 and 8 were allocated to each of the state's 7 congressional districts, and another 8 were allocated to party leaders and elected officials (PLEO delegates), in addition to 13 at-large delegates.

The Democratic state central committee had to vote on the 13 at-large and 8 pledged PLEO delegates to send to the Democratic National Convention. The delegation also included 11 unpledged PLEO delegates: 7 members of the Democratic National Committee, 4 members from Congress (2 senators, John Breaux and Mary Landrieu, and 2 representatives, Bill Jefferson and Chris John), and 1 add-on.

== Candidates ==
The following candidates appeared on the ballot:

- Al Gore
- Lyndon LaRouche Jr.
- Randy Crow

Withdrawn

- Bill Bradley

== Results ==
2000 Louisiana Democratic presidential primary
Candidate	Votes	%	Delegates
Al Gore	114,942	72.96	54
Bill Bradley (withdrawn)	31,385	19.92	7
Lyndon LaRouche Jr.	6,127	3.89	
Randolph Crow	5,097	3.24	
Uncommitted	-	-	11
Total	157,551	100%	61
