= 2000 Mississippi Democratic presidential primary =

- March 14, 2000

48 delegates to the Democratic National Convention (37 pledged, 11 unpledged) The number of pledged delegates received is determined by the popular vote

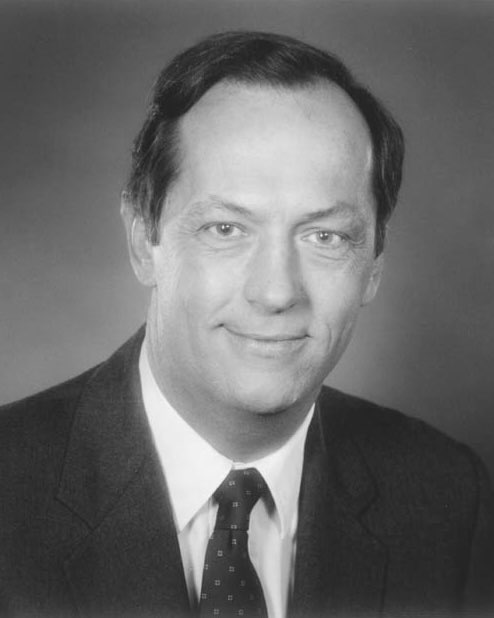
Candidate	Al Gore	Bill Bradley (withdrawn)
Home state	Tennessee	New Jersey
Delegate count	37	0
Popular vote	79,408	7,621
Percentage	89.62%	8.60%
- County results Gore: 70–80% 80–90% 90–100%

The 2000 Mississippi Democratic presidential primary took place on March 14, 2000, as one of several states voting the week after Super Tuesday in the Democratic Party primaries for the 2000 presidential election. The Mississippi primary was an open primary, with the state awarding 48 delegates towards the 2020 Democratic National Convention, of which 37 were pledged delegates allocated on the basis of the results of the primary.

Vice president Al Gore overwhelmingly won the primary in the southern state and every county with 89% of the vote, winning all of the 37 delegates, as he was the only candidate to get above 15% of the vote statewide. Senator Bill Bradley missed the 15% threshold, and so he only received zero district delegates.

== Procedure ==
Mississippi was one of six states which held primaries on March 14, 2000, alongside Florida, Louisiana, Oklahoma, Tennessee, and Texas after Super Tuesday the week before.

Voting took place throughout the state from 7:00 a.m. until 7:00 p.m. In the open primary, candidates had to meet a threshold of 15 percent at the congressional district or statewide level in order to be considered viable. The 37 pledged delegates to the 2000 Democratic National Convention were allocated proportionally on the basis of the results of the primary. Of these, between 4 and 5 were allocated to each of the state's 5 congressional districts and another 5 were allocated to party leaders and elected officials (PLEO delegates), in addition to 8 at-large delegates.

The state convention was then held to vote on the 8 at-large and 5 pledged PLEO delegates for the Democratic National Convention. The delegation also included 10 unpledged PLEO delegates: 6 members of the Democratic National Committee, 3 representatives from Congress, Bennie Thompson, Ronnie Shows, Gene Taylor, the governor Ronnie Musgrove, and 1 add-on.

Pledged national convention delegates
Type	Del.
CD1	5
CD2	5
CD3	5
CD4	5
CD5	5
PLEO	5
At-large	8
Total pledged delegates	37

== Candidates ==
The following candidates appeared on the ballot:

- Al Gore
- Lyndon LaRouche Jr.

Withdrawn

- Bill Bradley

== Results ==
2000 Mississippi Democratic presidential primary
Candidate	Votes	%	Delegates
Al Gore	79,408	89.62	37
Bill Bradley (withdrawn)	7,621	8.60	
Lyndon LaRouche Jr.	1,573	1.78	
Uncommitted	-	-	11
Total	88,602	100%	48
