= 2000 Oregon Democratic presidential primary =

- May 16, 2000

58 delegates to the Democratic National Convention (47 pledged, 11 unpledged) The number of pledged delegates received is determined by the popular vote

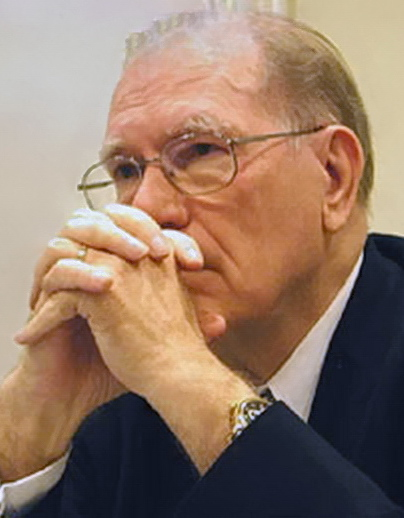
Candidate	Al Gore	Lyndon LaRouche Jr.
Home state	Tennessee	Virginia
Delegate count	47	0
Popular vote	300,922	38,521
Percentage	84.86%	10.86%
- Primary results by county Gore: 40–50% 50–60% 60–70% 70–80% 80–90% 90–100%

Pledged national convention delegates
Type	Del.
CD1	6
CD2	6
CD3	7
CD4	6
CD5	6
PLEO	6
At-large	10
Total pledged delegates	47

The 2000 Oregon Democratic presidential primary took place on May 16, 2000, in the Democratic Party primaries for the 2000 presidential election and was the only contest on that date. The Oregon primary was a closed primary and awarded 58 delegates to the 2000 Democratic National Convention, of whom 47 were pledged delegates allocated on the basis of the primary results.

Vice president Al Gore won the primary with 84% of the vote and 47 delegates, while perennial candidate Lyndon LaRouche Jr. received 10%, missing the 15% threshold to be eligible for delegates, which the Democratic National Committee had announced he'd be barred from receiving anyways.

== Procedure ==
Voting took place until 8:00 p.m. local time. Candidates had to meet a threshold of 15% at the congressional district or statewide level to be considered viable. The 47 pledged delegates to the 2000 Democratic National Convention were allocated proportionally on the basis of the primary results. Of these, between 6 and 7 were allocated to each of the state's five congressional districts and another 6 were allocated to party leaders and elected officials (PLEO delegates), in addition to 10 at-large delegates.

The delegation also included 13 unpledged PLEO delegates: 4 members of the Democratic National Committee, 5 members of Congress (One senator, Ron Wyden, and four representatives, David Wu, Earl Blumenauer, Peter DeFazio, and Darlene Hooley), the governor John Kitzhaber, and 1 add-on.

== Candidates ==
The following candidates appeared on the ballot:

- Al Gore
- Lyndon LaRouche Jr.

There was also an uncommitted option.

== Results ==
2000 Oregon Democratic presidential primary
Candidate	Votes	%	Delegates
Al Gore	300,922	84.86	47
Lyndon LaRouche Jr.	38,521	10.86	
Write-in votes	15,151	4.27	
Uncommitted	-	-	11
Total	354,594	100%	58
