= 2000 South Carolina Democratic presidential caucuses =

- March 9, 2000

53 delegates to the Democratic National Convention (43 pledged, 10 unpledged) The number of pledged delegates received is determined by the popular vote

Candidate	Al Gore	Uncommitted
Home state	Tennessee	–
Delegate count	43	0
Popular vote	8,864	514
Percentage	91.79%	5.32%
- Caucus results by county Gore: 50–60% 80–90% 90–100% No votes

The 2000 South Carolina Democratic presidential caucuses took place on March 9, 2000, and was the only nominating contest that day during the Democratic Party primaries for the 2000 presidential election. The South Carolina caucus was a closed caucus, meaning that only registered Democrats could vote in this caucus, and awarded 53 delegates to the 2000 Democratic National Convention, of which 43 were pledged delegates allocated on the basis of the results of the caucus.

Vice president Al Gore and senator Bill Bradley were the only candidates to seriously compete, but Bradley came in a far distant third. Gore won 91.7% of the popular vote and notably placed first in every county in the state not counting the three that had no caucus-goers. Bradley came in third place and won 1.78% of the popular vote just barely ahead of retired professor William Kreml, a Green Party member who was only on the ballot in this state, coming behind uncommitted, which won 5%. This defeat was the final blow to the Bradley campaign, who withdrew that night after disappointing finishes earlier in the week on Super Tuesday.

== Procedure ==
On September 28, 1999, the executive committee of the South Carolina Democratic Party voted to hold a presidential primary on Thursday, March 9, 2000. The decision came only days after the Rules and Bylaws Committee of the DNC denied the Party's request for a waiver to hold a primary on February 19, 2000, that being the same date as the Republican's South Carolina primary.

The executive committee decided to combine the presidential primary with the precinct meetings. This party-run process is often referred to as a "firehouse primary." Precinct meetings will immediately follow voting. The primary vote totals for each presidential candidate (or for uncommitted status) will be used at the state convention for the selection of delegates and alternates to the national convention.

The firehouse primary was held on Thursday, March 9, 2000. In the firehouse primary, candidates had to meet a viability threshold of 15 percent at the congressional district or statewide level in order to be considered viable. The 43 pledged delegates to the 2000 Democratic National Convention were allocated proportionally on the basis of the results of the primary. Of these, 28 were allocated on the basis of the results within each congressional district, and between 0 and 0 were allocated to each of the state's six congressional districts. Another 6 were allocated to party leaders and elected officials (PLEO delegates), in addition to 9 at-large delegates.

The precinct reorganization meetings subsequently were held immediately after voting, to choose delegates for the state conventions, directly followed by the national conventions. The delegation included 10 unpledged PLEO delegates: 4 members of the Democratic National Committee, 3 members from Congress (1 Senator, Ernest Hollings, and 2 representatives, James Clyburn and John Spratt), the governor Jim Hodges, and 1 add-on.

Pledged national convention delegates
Type	Del.
CD1	
CD2	
CD3	
CD4	
CD5	
CD6	
PLEO	6
At-large	9
Total pledged delegates	43

== Candidates ==
The following candidates appeared on the ballot:

- Al Gore
- Bill Bradley
- William Kreml

There was also an uncommitted option.

== Results ==
2000 South Carolina Democratic presidential caucuses
Candidate	Votes	%	Delegates
Al Gore	8,864	91.79	43
Uncommitted	514	5.32	10
Bill Bradley	172	1.78	
William Kreml	107	1.11	
Total	9,657	100%	53
