= 2000 Nevada Democratic presidential caucuses =

- March 12, 2000

20 delegates to the Democratic National Convention

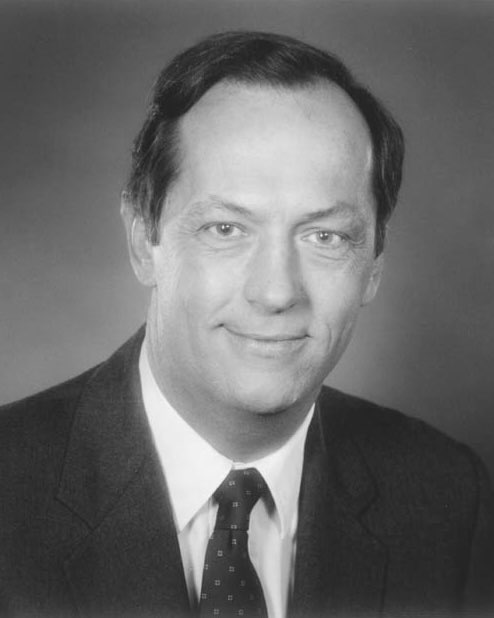
Candidate	Al Gore	Bill Bradley (withdrawn)
Home state	Tennessee	New Jersey
Delegate count	20
Popular vote	912	22
Percentage	98.0%	2.0%

The 2000 Nevada Democratic presidential caucuses took place on March 12, 2000, as part of the 2000 presidential primaries for the 2000 presidential election. 20 delegates to the 2000 Democratic National Convention were allocated to the presidential candidates.

Former Vice President AI Gore won the contest.

== Candidates ==
The following candidates on the ballot:

- Al Gore
- Uncommitted (voting option)
- Bill Bradley

== Results ==
Former Vice President Al Gore won in a landslide, taking all delegates to the Democratic National Convention and 98% of the popular votes, Bill Bradley, received 2% of the popular votes.

Nevada Democratic caucus, March 12, 2000
Candidate	Votes	Percentage	Actual delegate count		
Candidate	Votes	Percentage	Bound	Unbound	Total
Al Gore	912	98.0%	20		20
Uncommitted (voting option)					
Bill Bradley	22	2.0%			
Total:	934	100%	20		20

== See also ==
- 2000 Republican Party presidential primaries
- 2000 United States presidential election in Nevada
- 2000 Democratic Party presidential primaries
