= 2000 Alaska Democratic presidential caucuses =

- April 22, 2000

13 delegates to the Democratic National Convention
Candidate	Al Gore
Home state	Tennessee
Delegate count	13
Percentage	100.0%

The 2000 Alaska Democratic presidential caucuses were held on April 22, 2000, as part of the 2000 presidential primaries for the 2000 presidential election. 13 delegates to the 2000 Democratic National Convention were allocated to the presidential candidates.

Former Vice President AI Gore won the contest easily by taking all delegates.

== Candidates ==
The following candidates on the ballot:

- Al Gore
- Uncommitted (voting option)
- Bill Bradley

== Results ==
There were no popular votes in the contest, but Al Gore still won by taking all delegates.

Alaska Democratic caucus, April 22, 2000
Candidate	Votes	Percentage	Actual delegate count		
Candidate	Votes	Percentage	Bound	Unbound	Total
Al Gore			13		13
Uncommitted (voting option)					
Bill Bradley					
Total:			13		13

== See also ==
- 2000 United States presidential election in Alaska
- 2000 United States presidential election
- 2000 Democratic Party presidential primaries
- 2000 Republican Party presidential primaries
