= 2000 Alabama Democratic presidential primary =

- June 6, 2000

64 delegates to the Democratic National Convention (54 pledged, 10 unpledged) The number of pledged delegates received is determined by the popular vote

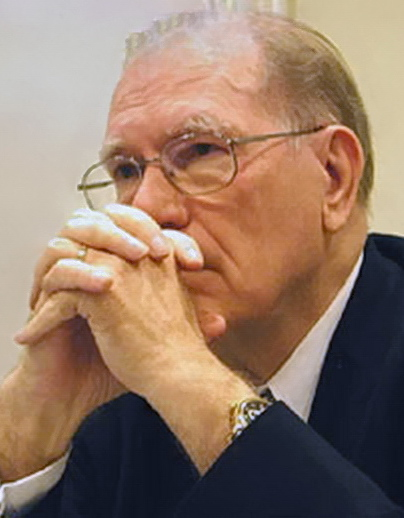
| Candidate | Al Gore | Uncommitted | Lyndon LaRouche Jr. |
| Home state | Tennessee | – | Virginia |
| Delegate count | 54 | 0 | 0 |
| Popular vote | 214,541 | 48,521 | 15,465 |
| Percentage | 77.02% | 17.42% | 5.55% |
- Primary results by county Gore: 50–60% 60–70% 70–80% 80–90% 90–100%

Pledged national convention delegates
| Type | Del. |
|---|---|
| CD1 | 5 |
| CD2 | 4 |
| CD3 | 5 |
| CD4 | 5 |
| CD5 | 5 |
| CD6 | 4 |
| CD7 | 7 |
| PLEO | 7 |
| At-large | 12 |
| Total pledged delegates | 54 |

The 2000 Alabama Democratic presidential primary took place on June 6, 2000, as one of five final contests scheduled in the Democratic Party primaries for the 2000 presidential election. The open primary allocated 54 pledged delegates towards the 2000 Democratic National Convention, distributed in proportion to the results of the primary, statewide and within each congressional district. The state was also given an additional 10 unpledged delegates (superdelegates), whose votes at the convention were not bound to the result of the primary.

Only two candidates ran in this primary, that being Vice President Al Gore and political activist and perennial candidate Lyndon LaRouche. Bill Bradley, the only other major contender for the nomination against Gore had withdrawn months prior to the primary and was therefore not on the ballot. Al Gore won by an overwhelming landslide, winning every county and congressional district in the state. He received 77% of the vote and was awarded 54 delegates. Uncommitted came in second place, with 17% of the vote, but no delegates were awarded. Lyndon LaRouche came in a distant third with roughly 5% of the vote, missing the 15% threshold for delegates.

== Procedure ==
Voting took place from 7 a.m. until 7 p.m CST. In the open primary, candidates had to meet a threshold of 15 percent at the congressional district or statewide level in order to be considered viable for delegates. The 54 pledged delegates to the 2000 Democratic National Convention were allocated proportionally on the basis of the results of the primary. Of these, between 4 and 7 were allocated to each of the state's 7 congressional districts and another 7 were allocated to party leaders and elected officials (PLEO delegates), in addition to 12 at-large delegates. The remaining 10 delegates consist of 9 Unpledged PLEOs and 1 Unpledged "add-on." These 10 delegates will go to the Democratic National Convention officially "unpledged." These unpledged delegates consist of 6 Democratic National Committee members, 2 members from the House of Representatives, 1 governor (Don Siegelman), and 1 add-on. The two Congressional delegates were 5th District Congressman Bud Cramer and 7th District Congressman Earl Hilliard. All 10 "unpledged" delegates voted for Gore at the convention.

== Candidates ==
The following candidates appeared on the ballot:

- Al Gore
- Lyndon LaRouche Jr.

There was also an uncommitted option.

== Results ==
2000 Alabama Democratic presidential primary
| Candidate | Votes | % | Delegates |
|---|---|---|---|
| Al Gore | 214,541 | 77.02 | 54 |
| Uncommitted | 74,755 | 16.54 | 10 |
| Lyndon LaRouche Jr. | 15,465 | 5.55 | |
| Total | 278,527 | 100% | 64 |

== Analysis ==
By this primary, Al Gore already secured the nomination. He easily won with 77% of the vote, including every county and congressional district. The largest turnout by far came from Jefferson County, Alabama, where Gore won with over 92%. Gore's best counties included the most populous counties in the state. He performed the worst in the more rural, white counties, where Uncommitted received double-digit support.
