= 2000 Democratic National Convention =

U.S. political event held in Los Angeles, California

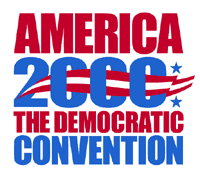
- 2000 presidential election

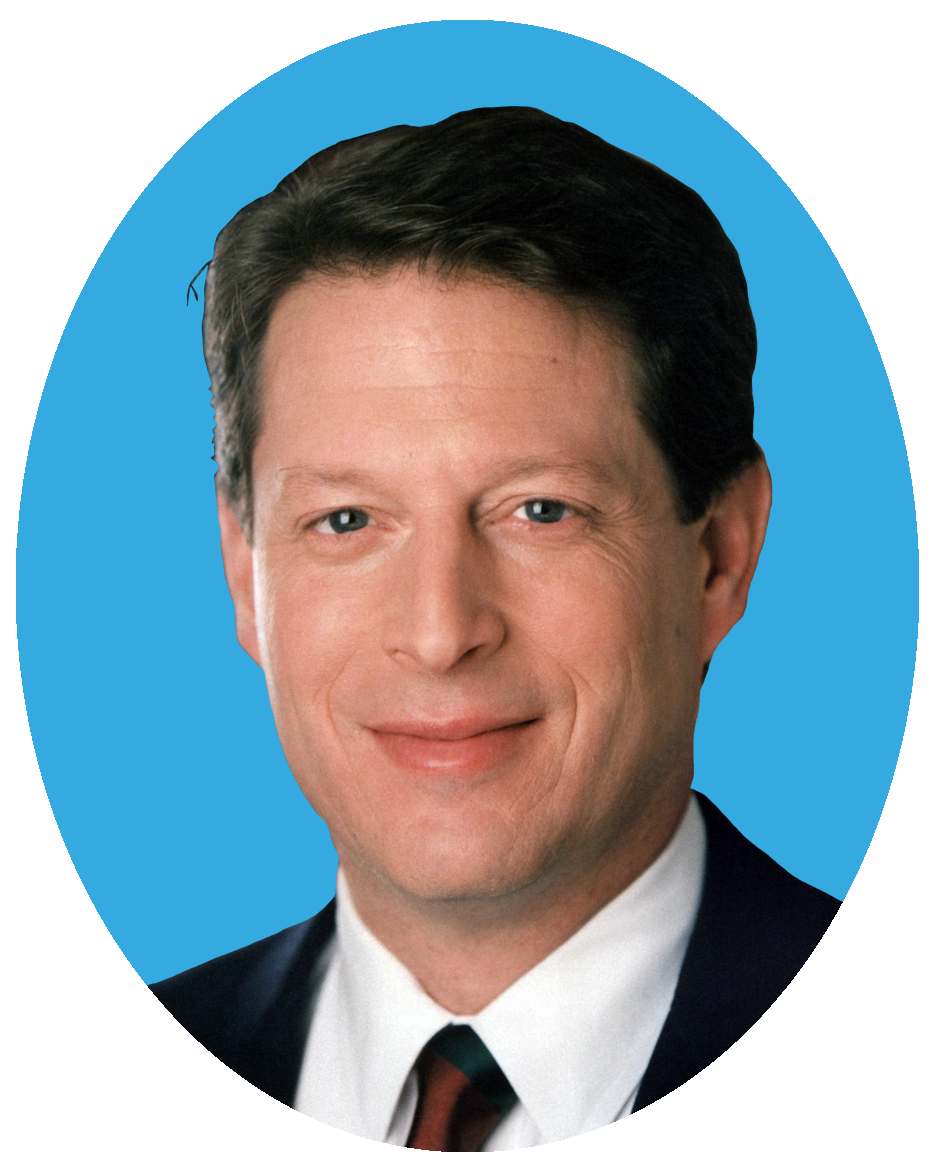
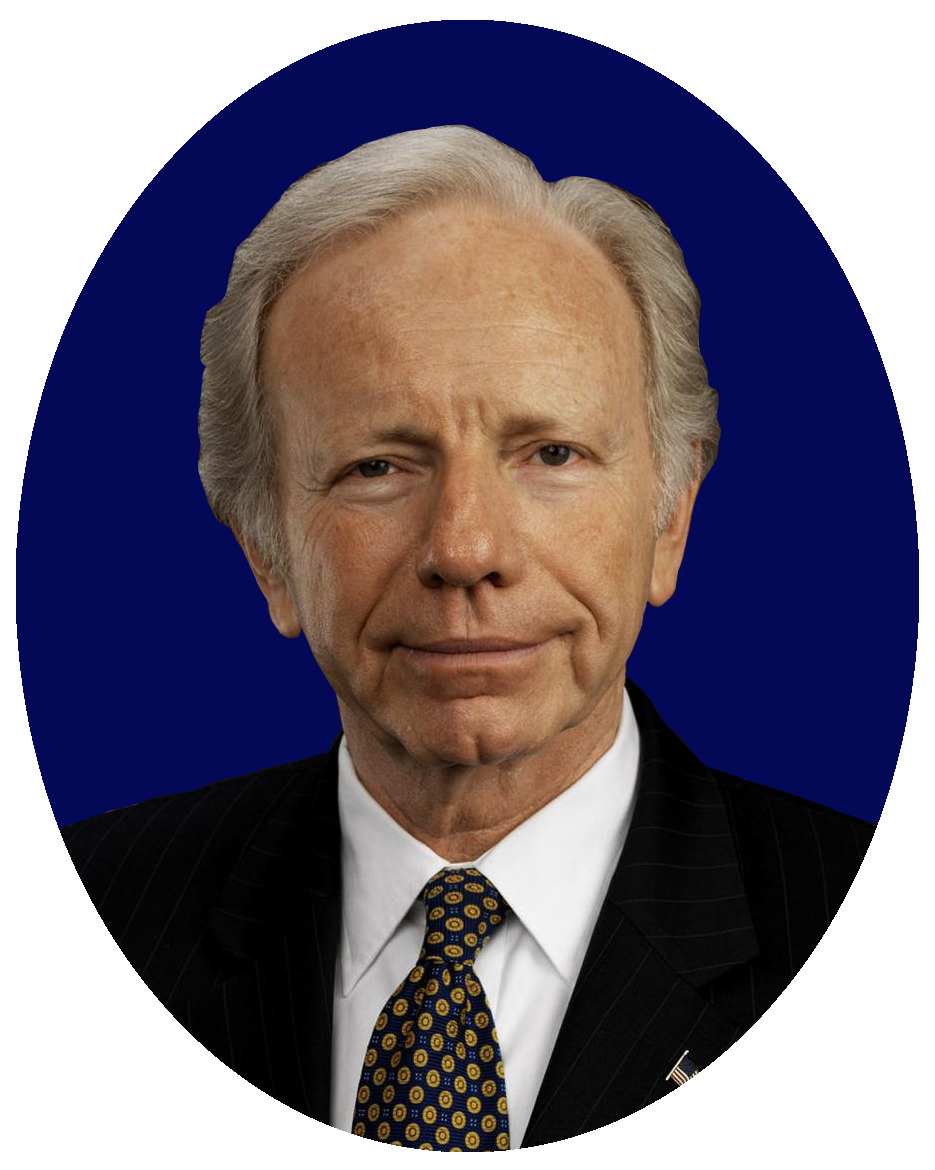
- Nominees; Gore and Lieberman

Convention
- Date(s): August 14–17, 2000
- City: Los Angeles, California
- Venue: Staples Center
- Chair: Terry McAuliffe
- Keynote speaker: Harold Ford Jr.

Candidates
- Presidential nominee: Al Gore of Tennessee
- Vice-presidential nominee: Joe Lieberman of Connecticut

Voting
- Total delegates: 4,337
- Votes needed for nomination: 2,171
- Results (president): Gore (TN): 4,328 (99.79%); Abstention: 9 (0.21%)
- Results (vice president): Lieberman (CT): Acclamation
- Ballots: 1

The 2000 Democratic National Convention was a quadrennial presidential nominating convention for the Democratic Party. The convention nominated Vice President Al Gore for president and Senator Joe Lieberman from Connecticut for vice president. The convention was held at the Staples Center in Los Angeles, California from August 14 to August 17, 2000. Gore accepted the presidential nomination on August 17, the final night of the convention.

== Logistics ==
=== Site selection ===
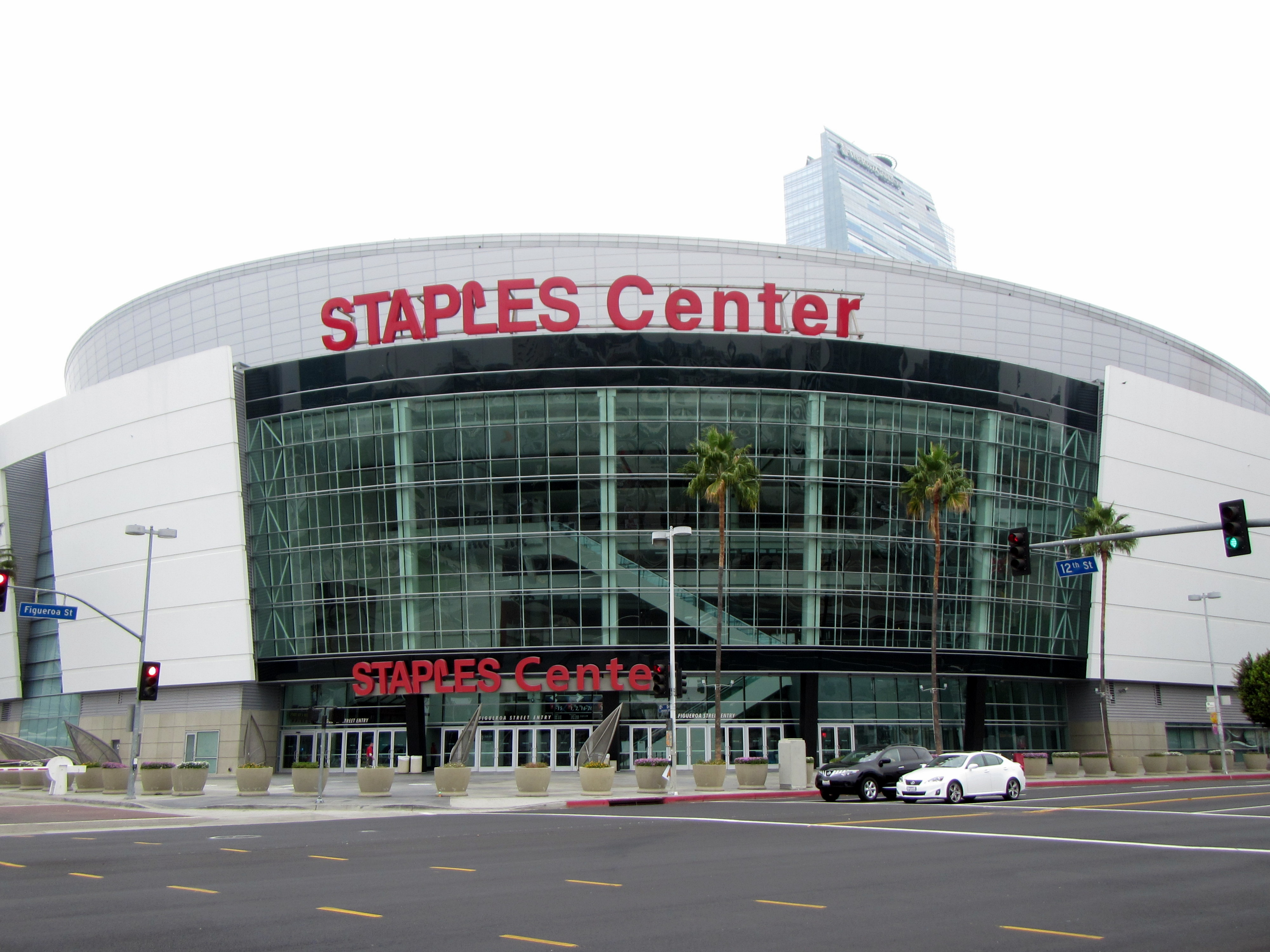
The Staples Center (now the Crypto.com Arena) was the site of the 2000 Democratic National Convention.

The Democratic National Committee (DNC) initially invited 28 cities to bid for the convention. The "preliminary general requirements" that the Democratic Party asked of bidding cities was to be able to provide 20,000 high-quality hotel rooms within 30 minutes of the venue, and for the venue to capable of holding 25,000 counting both fixed seating and floor seating. Nine cities submitted proposals. Of these, seven cities (Boston, Denver, Los Angeles, Miami, Minneapolis, New Orleans, and Philadelphia) received visits from DNC representatives. All except New Orleans were offering new venues that had been constructed in the 1990s. Philadelphia withdrew its bid after being selected as the host of the 2000 Republican National Convention. Boston, Denver, and Los Angeles were named as finalists.

On March 15, 1999, the DNC announced Los Angeles as the site of the convention. This was the second Democratic National Convention to be held in Los Angeles, with the first having been the 1960 convention. The other finalist cities would host the two following Democratic National Conventions; Boston hosted the 2004 convention while Denver hosted the 2008 convention.

Co-chairman of the committee leading Los Angeles' bid for the convention included Eli Broad and David Geffen, among others. The effort for Los Angeles to host was modeled after the private/public venture used to stage the 1984 Summer Olympics in Los Angeles. The city decided to bid only for the Democratic convention, and not seek the Republican convention because they felt that the odds of Republicans holding a convention in California was unlikely since the 1996 Republican National Convention was in San Diego, California.

Finalist bid cities
City	Venue (fixed seating)	Proposed budget	Previous major party conventions hosted by city
Boston, Massachusetts	Fleet Center (20,000)	$32.4 million	—N/a
Denver, Colorado	Pepsi Center (20,500)	$28.2 million	Democratic: 1908
Los Angeles, California	Staples Center (20,000)	$27 million	Democratic: 1960

Semi-finalists bid cities
City	Venue (fixed seating)	Proposed budget	Previous major party conventions hosted by city
Miami, Florida	American Airlines Arena (20,000)	$32 million	Democratic: 1972**; Republican: 1968,** 1972**
Minneapolis, Minnesota	Target Center (19,000)	$18 million	Republican: 1892
New Orleans, Louisiana	Louisiana Superdome (40,000)	$21 million	Republican: 1988
Philadelphia, Pennsylvania (withdrew bid)	CoreStates Center (21,000)	$35 million	Democratic: 1936, 1948; Republican: 1856, 1872, 1900, 1940, 1948; Whig: 1848
**Conventions held in Miami Beach, Florida, a municipality adjacent to Miami

=== Scheduling ===
Since the mid-20th century or earlier, it has been tradition for the party of the incumbent president to hold their convention after that of the other major party. In 2000, Republicans held their convention July 31 through August 3.

On April 16, 1999 Chair of the Democratic National Committee Joe Andrew announced that the convention would take place August 14–17.

=== Security ===
At both the 2000 major party presidential nominating conventions, security was heightened compared to that of past conventions.

Crowd control security concerns were heightened at the Democratic convention due to a number of the organizations behind the activities of the 1999 Seattle WTO protests pledging to protest in Los Angeles during the convention. Also, still in recent memory, was the 1992 Los Angeles riots.

In the fall of 1999, the Democratic National Convention Committee established a security task force, bringing together the convention's logistics team, the Los Angeles Police Department, the Los Angeles Fire Department, the United States Secret Service, and other agencies of the federal, state, and municipal levels.

Ken Banner served as the convention's director of security.

=== Stage design ===
Per a Democratic National Convention Committee's press release, the stage of the convention was elevated five feet above the floor of the arena, was roughly 3,700 square feet in area (with the podium measuring 1,825 square feet, the orchestra measuring 1,225 square feet, and the camera turrets measuring 720 square feet), and had an 18 × 30 foot video screen.

The podium's lectern was able to be mechanically lowered beneath the stage, and the walls located behind both sides of the lectern could also be raised from on the stage.

The podium was painted with water-based non-toxic paint, with the colors being Red 199, Blue 300, TV White (Cool Gray #3), and Metal Effects platinum #ME222.

Rene Lagler, who had been the interior designer for the 1988, 1992, and 1996 conventions, designed the podium, in addition to designing the central camera platform and also working on both the convention's interior and exterior design.

Bob Dickenson served as the convention's lighting designer, and Batrick Baltzell served as its audio designer.

The song "Mambo No. 5" was initially planned to play at the convention, much as "Macarena" had at the 1996 convention, but was scrapped due to concerns over lyrics, specifically the reference to a "Monica" in the song's chorus.

== Convention leadership ==
Ron Gonzales and Blanche Lincoln served as co-chairs of the convention's credentials committee. Mary Landrieu and Gary Locke served as co-chairs of the convention's rules committee.

The co-chairs of the convention's platform committee were Sharon Sayles Belton and Dick Durbin. Its vice chairs included Bob Butterworth, James Hunt Jr., Jack Reed. Other members of the committee included Jim Davis and C. Jack Ellis, Eleanor Holmes Norton. The chair of the platform drafting committee had been James Hunt Jr. Members of the platform drafting committee included Bill Purcell.

=== Democratic National Convention Committee ===
On September 21, 1999, a number of members of the convention's leadership were announced. Lydia Camarillo was announced as the convention's chief executive officer (CEO). Donald J. Foley was announced as chief operating officer (COO) of the convention. Rod O'Connor was announced as the chief of staff for the convention. Jeff Modisett was announced as deputy CEO and general counsel for the convention. Katreice Banks was announced as deputy CEO for external affairs. Mona Pasquil was announced as deputy CEO for community relations. It was also announced that Yolanda Caraway would consult with the conventions for external affairs, credentials, and productions. Jaci Wilson was announced as the convention's director of housing. Ofield Dukes was announced as one of the convention's communications consultants.

On September 23, 1999, Roy Romer was announced as chair of the Democratic National Convention Committee.

On December 9, 1999, additional convention staff were announced for the Democratic National Convention Committee. Anette Avina was announced as senior advisor to the CEO and director of special projects. Travis Berry was announced as senior advisor to the chairman and director of special projects. Simone M. Greene was announced as special assistant to the COO. Cindy M. Lott was announced as deputy general counsel. Liana Shwarz was announced as special assistant to the CEO. Lou Vasta was announced as director of logistics and operations. Luis Vizcaino was announced as the DNCC's press secretary.

On February 23, 2000, the Democratic National Convention Committee announced three key members of its convention security task force. Ken Banner was announced as director of security. John Vezeris and Joseph A. Masonis were announced as managing directors of the task force.

On March 10, 2000, Brian L. Wickersham was announced as the Democratic National Convention Committee's director of transportation, and Jeffery Lowery was announced as its deputy director of transportation.

On April 27, 2000, the Democratic National Convention Committee's production team was announced. Gary Smith was announced as executive producer, Ricky Kirshner was announced as producer, and Thomas E. Gorman was announced as director of production.

=== Convention officers ===
Terry McAuliffe served as the chair of the convention.

Paul E. Patton served as one of the co-chairs of the convention.

Thurbert Baker, Steny Hoyer, Patty Judge, and John S. Tanner served as parliamentarians.

== Balloting ==
Gore was nominated unanimously, and during the roll-call vote for president, Florida's delegation was given the honor of putting Gore over-the-top as the official nominee.

On the day before the convention started Bill Bradley released his delegates and directed them to vote for Gore. The votes of Bradley's delegates that wished to vote for him were registered as abstentions. The Balloting:

Candidates	
Name	Al Gore
Certified Votes	4,328 (99.79%)
Abstentions	9 (0.21%)
total:	4,337

Senator Joe Lieberman was nominated as the party's candidate for Vice President by voice vote.

Lieberman's formal nomination took place on the closing night of the convention, despite him having delivered his acceptance speech the previous night.

== Schedule ==
=== Official themes ===
Each day of the convention was assigned a theme. The first day's theme was "Prosperity and Progress", highlighting the economic progress that had occurred under the Clinton–Gore administration. The second day's theme was "New Heights: You Ain't Seen Nothing Yet", focusing on the potential of the future if proper decisions are carried out by new leadership. The third day's theme was "Al Gore: The Principled Fighter", highlighting Al Gore's life story. The closing day's theme was "Al Gore's vision for the future".

=== Notable speakers ===
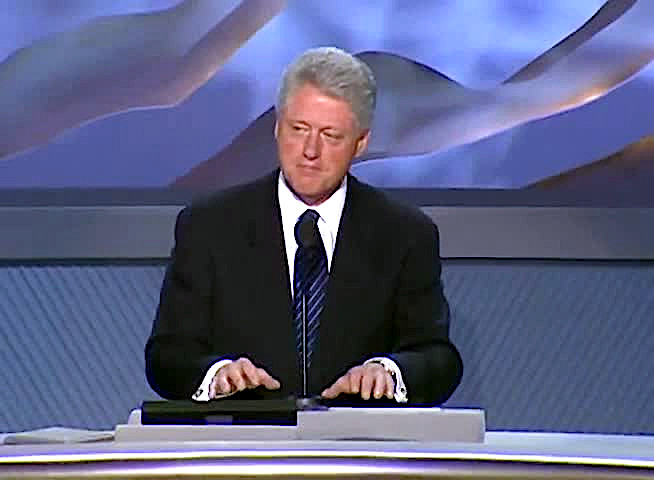
President Bill Clinton speaking at the convention

The keynote speaker of the convention was Congressman Harold Ford Jr. of Tennessee.

The highlight of the first night of the convention was a speech given by President Bill Clinton.

Other notable speakers included Gore's opponent for the Democratic nomination, Senator Bill Bradley, First Lady Hillary Clinton, Senators Christopher Dodd of Connecticut and Ted Kennedy of Massachusetts, Former Treasury Secretary Robert Rubin, and the Reverend Jesse Jackson.

Actor Tommy Lee Jones, Gore's roommate in college, officially nominated the vice president.

=== Notable performers ===
Day 1

- Craig Bierko and the Broadway cast of The Music Man: "76 Trombones"
- Melissa Etheridge: "America the Beautiful"

Day 2

- Pat Morita: "The Star-Spangled Banner"
- Los Lobos
- Jenny Powers: "The Star-Spangled Banner"
- Luther Vandross, "America...The Dream Goes On"

Day 3

- Mary Chapin Carpenter: "Why Walk When You Can Fly"
- Plus One: "The Star-Spangled Banner" and "America the Beautiful"
- Stevie Wonder and Diane Schuur: "The Star-Spangled Banner"

Day 4

- Boyz II Men: "The Star-Spangled Banner"
- Christie Brinkley: "Pledge of Allegiance"
- Phil Driscoll: "Battle Hymn of the Republic"
- Mark O'Connor, "Orange Blossom Special"

== Summaries of key speeches ==
=== Bill Clinton ===
Outgoing president Bill Clinton spoke on the convention's first night. Clinton noted his administration's accomplishments and praised Gore, saying that "You gave me that chance to turn those ideas and values into action, after I made one of the best decisions of my life: asking Al Gore to be my partner."

=== Gray Davis ===
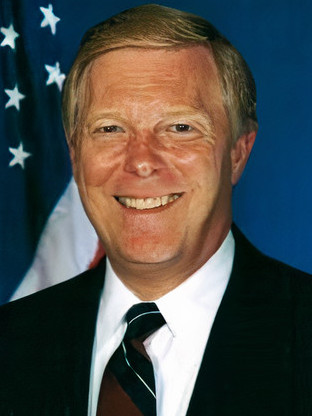

Americans are not looking for a rock star to be president. They want a serious man of substance.

— Dick Gephardt at the 2000 Democratic National Convention

Governor of California Gray Davis delivered remarks on both the first and third days of the convention.

His first speech was a welcoming speech on behalf of the host state of the convention. In it, he harkened back to the 1960 Democratic National Convention held in Los Angeles 40 years earlier, which nominated John F. Kennedy for president, and declared, "we remain the new frontier President Kennedy envisioned here. And our party still embodies the spirit of service and duty he called to life.". He highlighted a number of values and issues that he argued were promoted by Democratic Party.

=== Harold Ford Jr. ===
The keynote speaker of the convention was Congressman Harold Ford Jr. of Tennessee. Ford spoke on the second night of the convention.

Ford, who, at 30, was at the time the youngest member of Congress, directed his speech towards younger voters, saying, "I also stand here representing a new generation, a generation committed to those ideals and inspired by an unshakable confidence in our future."

=== Dick Gephardt ===
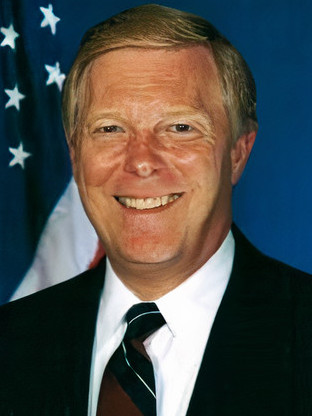

The present leadership in Congress has been totally unwilling to consider, much less decide, issues that are very important for millions of people...Every day in every way, Republican leadership has been one-sided, intolerant of other views, unbending to compromise and consensus. Hear me. When we win the White House back, we will replace "my way or the highway" with our way together.

— Dick Gephardt at the 2000 Democratic National Convention

Minority leader of the United States House of Representatives Dick Gephardt of Missouri spoke on the convention's third night. In his speech, he criticized the Republican majority in both chambers of the United States Congress. He characterized them as unwilling to pass a patients' bill of rights, a Medicare prescription benefit, campaign reform, and gun safety measures.

=== Al Gore ===
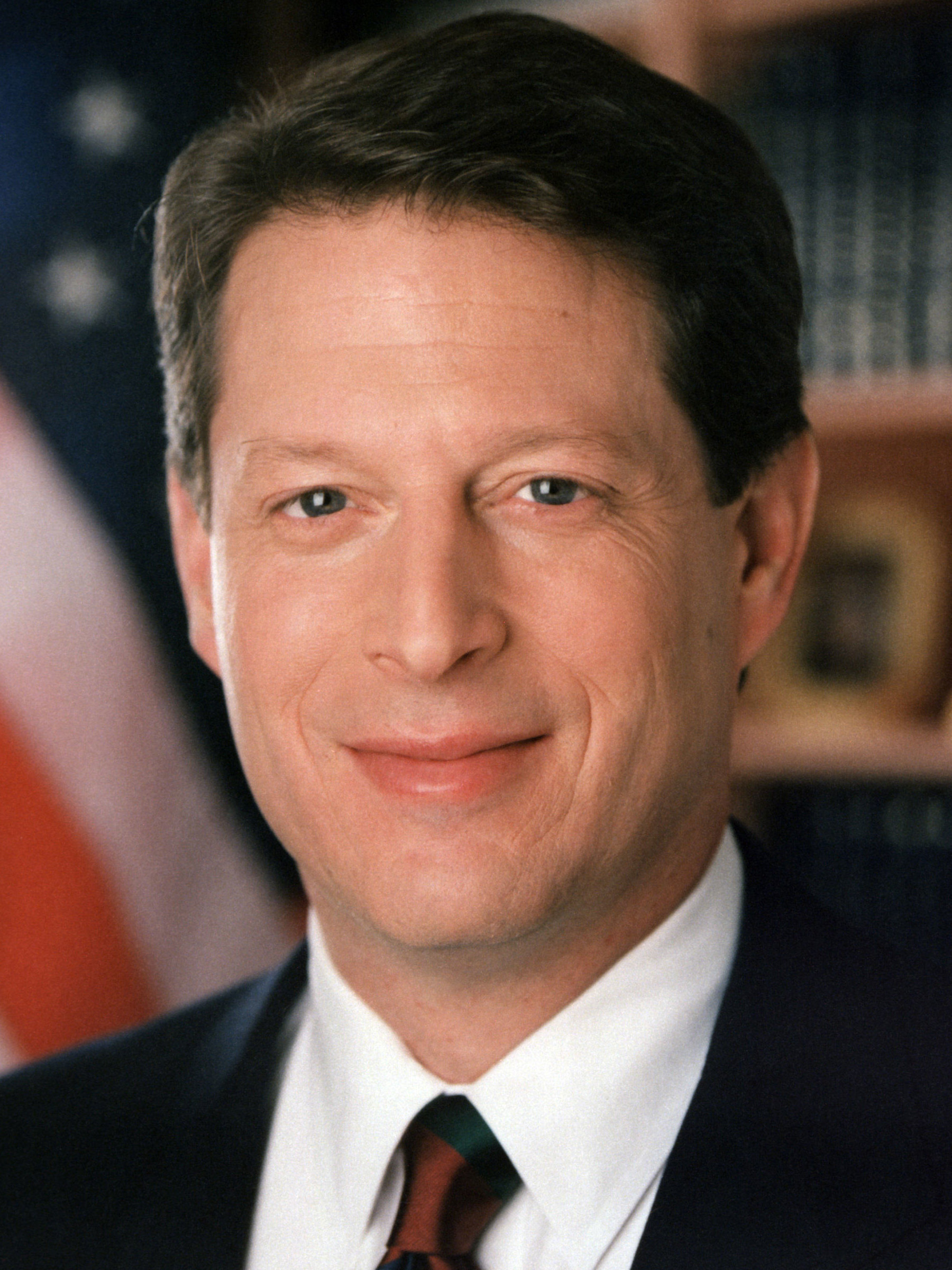

The Presidency is more than a popularity contest. It's a day-by-day fight for people. Sometimes, you have to choose to do what's difficult or unpopular. Sometimes, you have to be willing to spend your popularity in order to pick the hard right over the easy wrong. There are big choices ahead, and our whole future is at stake. And I do have strong beliefs about it. If you entrust me with the Presidency, I know I won't always be the most exciting politician. But I pledge to you tonight, I will work for you every day and I will never let you down.

— Al Gore at the 2000 Democratic National Convention

Al Gore delivered his presidential nomination acceptance speech on the final night of the convention.

Gore's acceptance speech focused on the future saying, "We're entering a new time, we're electing a new president, and I stand here tonight as my own man. I want you to know me for who I truly am." He mentioned President Clinton only once near the beginning of the speech. The speech was focused on issues: "I'm here to talk seriously about the issues. I believe people deserve to know specifically what a candidate proposes to do. I intend to tell you tonight. You ought to be able to know, and then judge for yourself."

=== Jesse Jackson ===
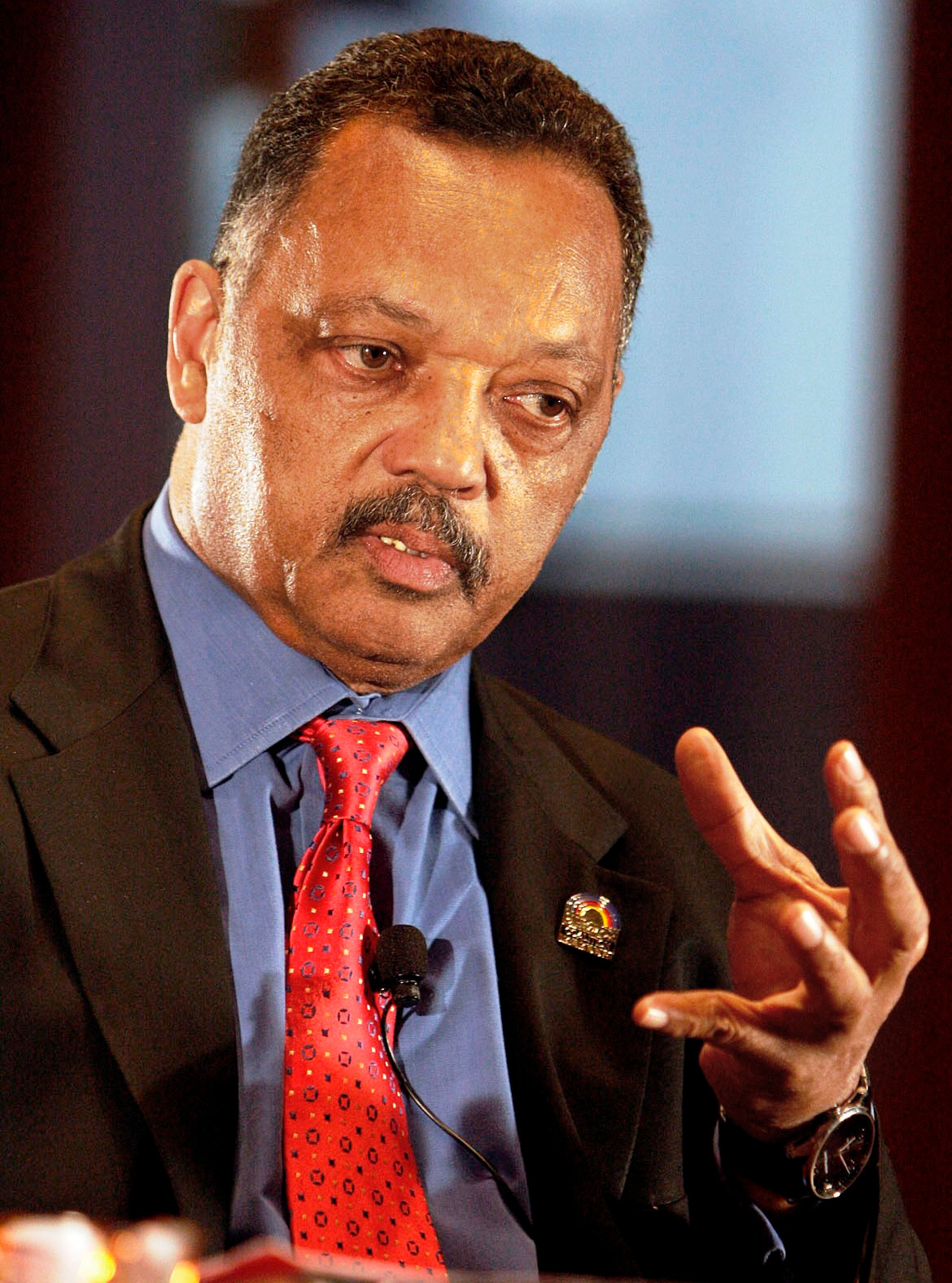

Look at the record, look at the policy choice, look at the team on the field. And I say to you, you will agree there is more with Gore.

— Jesse Jackson at the 2000 Democratic National Convention

Jesse Jackson, founder, president and CEO of the Rainbow/Push Coalition; former United States shadow senator from the District of Columbia; and candidate for the 1984 and 1988 Democratic presidential nominations, spoke on the convention's second evening.

In his speech, Jackson criticized the Republican convention held two weeks earlier, commenting, "Two weeks ago, in Philadelphia, the nation was treated to a stage show - smoke, mirrors, hired acts that Republicans called inclusion. That was the inclusion illusion. In Philadelphia, diversity ended on the stage. They could not mention the words Africa, Appalachia, or AIDS once. So it is good to be here in Los Angeles, to look over this great assembly and see the real deal - the quilt of many patches that is America."

Jackson strongly praised the selection of Lieberman as Gore's running mate, while criticizing Republican vice presidential nominee Dick Cheney.

Jackson named a number of issues where he argued Gore and Lieberman held the moral high ground over Bush and Cheney.

Jackson characterized the Republicans as a "grizzly old team" seeking to give tax breaks to the rich. He warned voters that a Bush victory would not just bring Bush to power, but also a "team" comprised Republicans such as Dick Armey, Bob Barr, Tom DeLay, Jesse Helms, and Strom Thurmond. Jackson urged America to, "stay out of the Bushes", a phrase which the audience began chanting.

=== Tommy Lee Jones ===
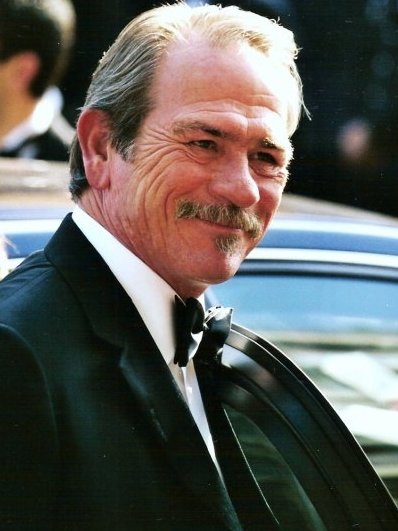

Al, I know you're watching tonight. And I want America to know what I know: you're going to be one of the best Presidents the country has ever had. We need a person with your commitment. We need a person with your heart. Because the Office of the President represents every child on Earth.

— Tommy Lee Jones at the 2000 Democratic National Convention

Actor Tommy Lee Jones, who had been college roommates with Al Gore, delivered a nominating speech for Gore on the convention's third night. Jones recounted his friendship with Gore, and hailed Gore's character.

=== Hadassah Lieberman ===
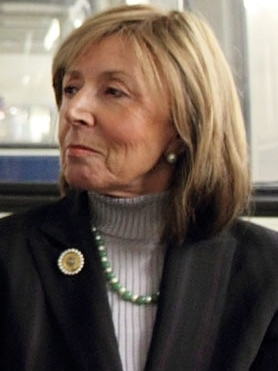

When Al Gore chose my husband as his running mate, this country got a man whose mission in life is inspired by the people he serves and the community he loves.

— Hadassah Lieberman at the 2000 Democratic National Convention

Hadassah Lieberman, the wife of the vice presidential nominee, delivered an introduction before her Husband's acceptance speech on the convention's third night.

=== Joe Lieberman ===
Lieberman delivered his vice presidential nomination acceptance speech on the third night of the convention, despite the fact that he would not be formally nominated until the next day.

Vice-presidential nominee Lieberman invoked the spirit of John F. Kennedy in his speech, saying: "Tonight, I believe that the next frontier isn't just in front of us, but inside of us--to overcome the differences that are still between us, to break down the barriers that remain and to help every American claim the possibilities of their own lives."

== Protests ==
Large scale, sometimes violent protests took place outside of the Staples Center as well as throughout downtown Los Angeles. Protest groups ranged from anti-abortion supporters, to homeless activists, to anti-globalization protestors, and anarchists. Out of increased fear after the surprise mass-protests at the 1999 "Battle for Seattle" WTO protests, media coverage and LAPD concern were heightened for the event.

Concerns were further raised when violent riots also broke out after the Los Angeles Lakers won the 2000 National Basketball Association Championship only a few months before the convention. Originally, a "Protest Zone" was designated a city block away from the Staples Center, but a court order forced the zone moved immediately adjacent to the arena, in a parking lot.

The protests became violent during the first evening of the convention, and many different protests, some orderly, some violent, took place over the full four days of the convention. There were numerous arrests, injuries and property damage, but the protests were less than originally feared. The band Rage Against the Machine played outside the convention showing its disdain of the policies being promoted inside the building.

== After the convention ==
In November, Al Gore narrowly lost to Texas Governor George W. Bush in the general election having won the popular vote but losing the electoral vote in a decision handed down more than a month after the election by the Supreme Court. This decision read as follows: "Noting that the Equal Protection clause guarantees individuals that their ballots cannot be devalued by 'later arbitrary and disparate treatment,' the per curiam opinion held 7–2 that the Florida Supreme Court's scheme for recounting ballots was unconstitutional. Even if the recount was fair in theory, it was unfair in practice. The record suggested that different standards were applied from ballot to ballot, precinct to precinct, and county to county. Because of those and other procedural difficulties, the court held, 5 to 4, that no constitutional recount could be fashioned in the time remaining".

== See also ==
- 2000 Green National Convention
- 2000 Libertarian National Convention
- 2000 Republican National Convention
- 2000 Democratic Party presidential primaries
- 2000 United States presidential election
- History of the United States Democratic Party
- List of Democratic National Conventions
- United States presidential nominating convention
- Al Gore 2000 presidential campaign

Preceded by 1996; Chicago, Illinois	Democratic National Conventions	Succeeded by 2004; Boston, Massachusetts
