= John F. Kennedy High School (Willingboro, New Jersey) =

Defunct high school in Burlington County, New Jersey

Location
- Willingboro Township, New Jersey; United States
- 40.0314°N 74.8824°W

Information
- Type: Public high school
- Opened: 1960
- Closed: 1989
- School district: Willingboro Township Public Schools

John F. Kennedy High School is a defunct public high school in Willingboro Township in Burlington County, New Jersey, United States that operated from 1962 to 1989, as part of the Willingboro Township Public Schools. It operated first as Levittown High School, and was renamed in 1964 following the president's death.

== History ==
Levittown Junior-Senior High School opened for the 1960-61 school year with approximately 1,000 students in grades 7-12, including students who had been attending either Burlington City High School or Rancocas Valley Regional High School. The plan was for the Junior-Senior High School to become a junior high school once the district opened a standalone high school.

Willingboro High School, located 1.5 miles (2.4 km) away on Kennedy Way, was opened in 1975 as a response to the overcrowded student population at John F. Kennedy High School, which had just graduated nearly 1000 in a single class. For a short time, residents were having a difficult time in deciding what to call the new Willingboro high school; some sought to name the new high school "J.F. Kennedy High School - East" while others debated on naming the school, "Robert F. Kennedy" after the recently deceased Attorney General and senator from New York and President Kennedy's brother. A vote was taken and it was decided that the only appropriate name would be what the school is called today "Willingboro High School".

The two schools were merged at the start of the 1989-90 school year, with all students transferred to Willingboro High School. John F. Kennedy High School was closed and re-purposed as a junior high school. The school was renamed the John F. Kennedy Junior High School and served as a junior high school from 1989 to 1991. After the 1991 school year, the junior high school was moved to the newly re-opened Memorial Junior High School. The building was again re-purposed and utilized as a recreation center and rented space to various organizations.

Willingboro Township purchased the site of the defunct high school in late 1998, with plans to turn it into a community center that could include a conference center, theater, indoor tennis courts and other athletic facilities. A new renovation to the Kennedy Center began in 2014.

The defunct school is kept alive on a Facebook page and in active reunions and former-student associations.

== Recent controversy ==
In August 2014, a referendum was inserted into the township meeting's agenda to change the name of the Kennedy High School building to the "Barack Obama Center". Graduates and longtime residents turned up in impressive numbers to protest the change at a special meeting of the township council on 2 September. A petition was presented with 1200 names rejecting the proposal. At the meeting, two council members admitted they "didn't know the history" behind the choice of Kennedy's name for the school (Kennedy had campaigned in then-new Willingboro in 1960) and mayor Eddie Campbell willingly conceded that the late addition to the referendum deserved to be dropped.

Councilman Chris Walker who proposed the last minute referendum, acknowledged that it is unusual to name a building after a sitting President, and conceded that based on his personal opinion of President Obama, that "he served the honor. Councilman Darvis Holley echoed Councilman Walker personal opinion by stating "I idolize Barack Obama". Both Councilman's personal opinions were found to not be representative of their constituents or the alumni of the school bearing President Kennedy's name. After much public outcry in the form of petitions, news coverage, and negative comments on social media, the referendum was pulled.

== Notable alumni ==
- Tony Bellinger (born 1957, class of 1977), retired American soccer defender who played both in the North American Soccer League and Major Indoor Soccer League
- Jeff Gammage (born 1960, class of 1978), reporter for The Philadelphia Inquirer who won the Pulitzer Prize for Public Service in 2012
- Anthony Griggs (born 1960), former NFL linebacker who played for the Philadelphia Eagles and Cleveland Browns
- David Grimaldi (born 1954), former professional soccer defender who served as Commissioner of the National Indoor Soccer League
- Charles W. Hooper (class of 1975), Lieutenant General in the United States Army who has held the position of Director of the Defense Security Cooperation Agency since 2017
- Cleveland Lewis (born 1955), first African American North American Soccer League player and brother of Olympic track athletes Carl and Carol Lewis
- Patrick McFarland (born 1951), former professional basketball player who played in the American Basketball Association for the Denver Rockets, Denver Nuggets, and San Diego Sails
