= Willingboro High School =

High school in Burlington County, New Jersey, US

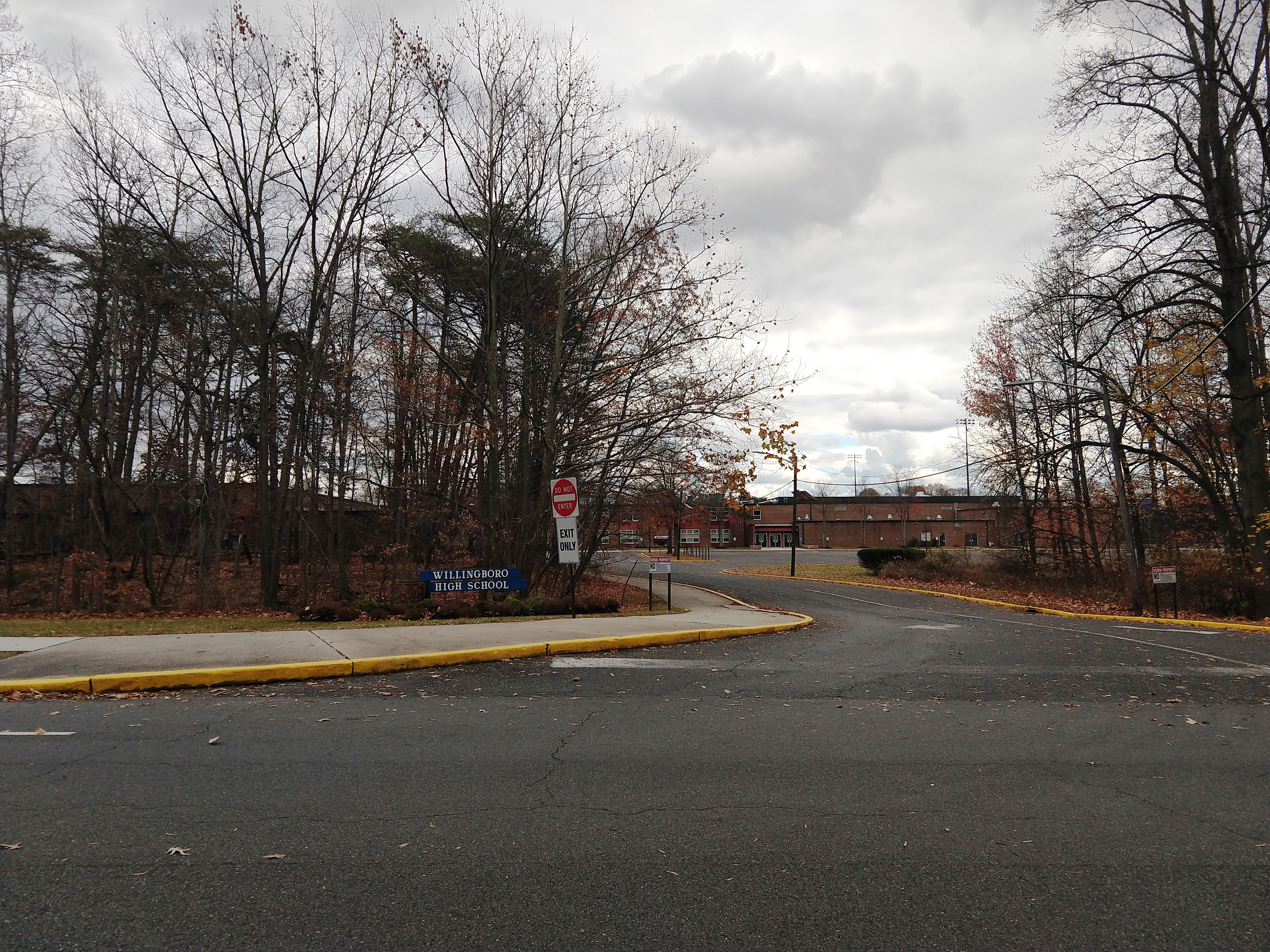
- Front of the school

Location
- 20 JFK Way; Willingboro Township, Burlington County, New Jersey 08046; United States; 40.010439°N 74.88825°W

Information
- Type: Public high school
- Established: 1975
- School district: Willingboro Public Schools
- NCES School ID: 341800001264
- Principal: Jonathan Taylor
- Faculty: 62.0 FTEs
- Grades: 9–12
- Enrollment: 845 (as of 2024–25)
- Student to teacher ratio: 13.6:1
- Colors: Navy; Scarlet
- Athletics conference: Burlington County Scholastic League (general); West Jersey Football League (football)
- Team name: Chimeras
- Website: www.willingboroschools.org/o/willingboro-high-school

Willingboro High School is a four-year comprehensive public high school that serves students in ninth through twelfth grades from Willingboro Township in Burlington County, in the U.S. state of New Jersey, operating as the lone secondary school of the Willingboro Public Schools.

As of the 2024–25 school year, the school had an enrollment of 845 students and 62.0 classroom teachers (on an FTE basis), for a student–teacher ratio of 13.6:1. There were 525 students (62.1% of enrollment) eligible for free lunch and 58 (6.9% of students) eligible for reduced-cost lunch.

== Awards, recognition and rankings ==
The school was the 320th-ranked public high school in New Jersey out of 339 schools statewide in New Jersey Monthly magazine's September 2014 cover story on the state's "Top Public High Schools", using a new ranking methodology. The school had been ranked 252nd in the state of 328 schools in 2012, after being ranked 295th in 2010 out of 322 schools listed. The magazine ranked the school 247th in 2008 out of 316 schools. The school was ranked 300th in the magazine's September 2006 issue, which surveyed 316 schools across the state. Schooldigger.com ranked the school as 362nd out of 376 public high schools statewide in its 2010 rankings (a decrease of 17 positions from the 2009 rank) which were based on the combined percentage of students classified as proficient or above proficient on the language arts literacy and mathematics components of the High School Proficiency Assessment (HSPA).

== History ==
The high school was opened in 1975 as a response to the overcrowded student population at John F. Kennedy, then the only high school in Willingboro, located down the road on Kennedy Way. For a short time, residents were having a difficult time in deciding what to call the new Willingboro high school; some sought to name the new high school "J.F. Kennedy High School – East" while others debated on naming the school, "Robert F. Kennedy" after President Kennedy's brother, the former US Attorney General during his administration. A vote was taken and it was decided that the only appropriate name would be what the school is called today, "Willingboro High School." The school colors are navy blue, scarlet and white – which are the slight opposite of the school's former sister school, J.F.K. (which were scarlet, navy and white). The mascot is the "Chimera", a mythological monster with the head of a lion and body of a goat and the tail of a serpent, opposite of the former sister school, which was a "Gryphon, which had the head of an eagle and the body of a lion."

The two schools were merged at the start of the 1989–90 school year, with all students attending what is now Willingboro High School and the former Kennedy High School facility being repurposed as a junior high.

== Athletics ==
The Willingboro High School Chimeras compete in the Patriot Division of the Burlington County Scholastic League (BCSL) sports association, which operates under the jurisdiction of the New Jersey State Interscholastic Athletic Association (NJSIAA) and is comprised of public and private high schools in Burlington, Mercer and Ocean counties in Central Jersey. With 460 students in grades 10-12, the school was classified by the NJSIAA for the 2019–20 school year as Group I for most athletic competition purposes, which included schools with an enrollment of 75 to 476 students in that grade range. The football team competes in the Liberty Division of the 94-team West Jersey Football League superconference and was classified by the NJSIAA as Group II South for football for 2024–2026, which included schools with 514 to 685 students.

The school was the winner of the Group I winner of the 2019–20 Shop Rite Cup, which recognizes athletic achievement across all interscholastic sports.

The field hockey team won the Group IV state championship in 1976 (defeating Morris Knolls High School in the finals) and 1978 (vs. Westfield High School). After four wins in 17 games the previous season, the 1976 team won the Group IV title with a 3-0 win against Morris Knolls in the championship game played at Mercer County Park to finish the season with a record of 16-1-3. The 1978 team won the Group IV state title with a 3-0 win against Westfield in the final round of the playoffs.

The girls' basketball team won the Group IV state championship in 1978 vs. Columbia High School and won Group III titles in 2000 vs. Orange High School, in 2002 vs. Malcolm X Shabazz High School and in 2007 vs. South Plainfield High School. A basket scored in the last seconds of the game gave the 1978 team the Group III state championship with a 44-42 win in the championship game against a Columbia High School team that entered the finals undefeated. The team won the 2007 Group III state championship, defeating South Plainfield by a score of 53–46 in the tournament championship for the title. The team won the South, Group III state sectional championship in 2000 with a 47–35 win against Pemberton Township High School.

The boys' track team won the Group IV spring / outdoor track state championship in 1979, 1981, 1982, 1990, 1991, 1993, 1994, 2002 and 2003, won the Group III title in 1986, 1988 and 1989, won the Group I title in 2019 and won in Group II in 2022. The program's 14 group titles are ranked fourth in the state. The 1989 team won the Group III state title ahead of Bridgeton High School 35-27.

The girls' team won the NJSIAA spring / outdoor track Group IV title in 1980 and 1981, and won the Group III title in 1999 and 2002.

The girls' track team won the winter / indoor track Meet of Champions in 1980 and 1981. The team won the winter / indoor track state championship in Group IV in 1981 and won the Group III title in 1998 and 2002-04. The program's five state group titles are tied for seventh-most in the state.

The boys' track team won the indoor relay championship in Group III in 1982, 1983, 1990, 1996, 1997 (as co-champion), 2000-2003, 2005, won the Group IV title in 1985-1987, the Group II title in 2012, and the Group I title in 2015-2020; The boys program's 17 group titles are ranked second in the state. The girls team won the Group IV title in 1992, 1993, 1995, won the Group III title in 2002-2005, and the Group I in 2010, 2019 and 2020; The girls programs 10 state titles are tied for the most in the state.

The boys' indoor / winter track team won the Group IV state championship in 1983, 1990, 1995, 1997, won the Group III title in 1986-1989, 2000 and 2002, won the Group II title in 2012 and the Group I title in 2018-20 and 2022; The program's 16 state championships are the second-most in the state.

The football team won the NJSIAA South Jersey Group III state sectional championship in 1985, and won the Central Jersey Group I state sectional title in 2018 and 2019. The team won the Central Jersey Group I sectional title in 2018 with a 22-14 win against Paulsboro High School in the championship game. The 2019 football team won the Central Jersey Group I title in 2019 with wins against Haddon Township High School by a score of 61-0, in the semifinals against Buena Regional High School by a score of 30-28 and won the team's second consecutive sectional title with a 40-8 win against Salem High School in the championship game. The 2019 team went on to win the South / Central Group I bowl game with a 50-14 win against Penns Grove High School in the regional championship.

== Administration ==
The school's principal is Jonathan Taylor, whose core administration team includes two assistant principals.

== Notable alumni ==
- Chiquita Brooks-LaSure (class of 1992), healthcare policy official who has been the administrator for the Centers for Medicare and Medicaid Services since May 2021
- City High group members Claudette Ortiz, Robby Pardlo and Ryan Toby
- Tom Davis (born c. 1970), college basketball standout at Delaware State University
- Chuck Faucette (born 1963), former NFL linebacker who played for the San Diego Chargers for two seasons
- James Green (born 1992), amateur wrestler who won bronze at the 2015 World Wrestling Championships at Men's freestyle 70 kg
- David Grimaldi (born 1954), former professional soccer player who served as Commissioner of the National Indoor Soccer League
- Marvin Hargrove (born 1968), football player who played wide receiver for the Philadelphia Eagles in 1990
- Allen Harvin (born 1959), American football running back who played in the National Football League for the Washington Redskins
- Nola Henry (born 1994, class of 2012), professional basketball coach who is an assistant coach for the Dallas Wings of the WNBA
- Ben Ijalana (born 1989), offensive tackle for the New York Jets
- Kamal Johnson (born 1991), American football defensive tackle who played in the NFL for the Miami Dolphins
- Crystal Langhorne (born 1986, class of 2004), women's basketball player for the University of Maryland and national champion in the 2006 NCAA Women's tournament. Langhorne was drafted by the Washington Mystics
- Carl Lewis (born 1961), track and field athlete, winner of ten Olympic medals, including nine gold medals
- Carol Lewis (born 1963), former track and field athlete who specialized in the long jump
- Cleve Lewis (born 1955), retired professional soccer player who was the first African American drafted by the North American Soccer League
- Kareem McKenzie (born 1979), National Football League offensive tackle
- Shalèt Monique (class of 2006), actress, writer and producer, who has appeared in Straw and We Own This City
- Wanya Morris (born 1973), member of Boyz II Men
- Dezman Moses (born 1989), National Football League linebacker with the Green Bay Packers
- Shaun Phillips (born 1981), National Football League outside linebacker
- Troy Singleton (born 1973), politician who has represented the 7th Legislative District in the New Jersey Senate since January 9, 2018
- LaMont Smith (born 1972), runner who was a gold medalist in the 4 × 400 meters relay at the 1996 Summer Olympics
- Ryan Toby (born 1976), soul singer, songwriter, producer, and actor best known for playing Wesley Glen Ahmal James in the 1993 film Sister Act 2: Back in the Habit
- Mike Zombie (born 1992 as William Michael Coleman), record producer and rapper
