= Marvin Hargrove =

American football player (born 1968)

No. 80
- Position: Wide receiver

Personal information
- Born: April 23, 1968 (age 58); Philadelphia, Pennsylvania, U.S.

Career information
- College: Richmond
- NFL draft: 1990: undrafted

Career history
- Philadelphia Eagles (1990); Raleigh-Durham Skyhawks (1991)

Career NFL statistics
- Receptions: 1
- Receiving yards: 34
- Touchdowns: 1
- Stats at Pro Football Reference

Marvin Andre Hargrove (born April 23, 1968) is an American former professional football player who was a wide receiver for the Philadelphia Eagles of the National Football League (NFL) in 1990. He played college football for the Richmond Spiders. After not being chosen in the 1990 NFL draft, Hargrove received a position after personally appealing to the Eagles' coach. In his first NFL game, he scored the only touchdown of his career. However, he only played six other games before being dropped from the team, ending his NFL career.

== Early life ==
Hargrove grew up in Willingboro Township, New Jersey, and attended Willingboro High School. His father was a bus driver, who was a long-time fan of the Eagles and a season-ticket holder. At high school, Hargrove was a star receiver. After graduation, he attended University of Richmond on a football scholarship. While he played well at Richmond, the school was a small school that was unable to compete against the larger competitors. In addition, Richmond's offense collapsed in his senior year, and the same year he had to sit out because of injuries. Because of his injury, his 40-yard dash time in front of the NFL recruiter was longer than expected. These factors, combined with his small size for pro football, resulted in him not being chosen for the 1990 NFL draft.

== NFL career ==
Marvin Hargrove was a rare example of an undrafted player who walked into training camp and was chosen to play on an NFL team. While other college players had given up on football, he continued to retain an agent, and showed up to Philadelphia Eagles training camp in June 1990. While originally staying with the fans, Hargrove took the opportunity to personally ask coach Buddy Ryan for a chance. Ryan had Hargrove run a 40-yard dash, which he completed in a respectable 4.5 seconds. Ryan then brought Hargrove to the team office to sign a contract in the event he was chosen for the team. This contract, however, did not indicate he would be chosen, and Hargrove knew this would be unlikely.

At team practice camp, Hargrove greatly exceeded all expectations. He also became a favorite of both fans and teammates. As a result, Ryan picked Hargrove for the starting roster of a 1990 pre-season game. As other free agents signed, Hargrove was dropped from the roster, but Ryan suggested he wait for a call. After other players succumbed to injuries, Hargrove was reinstated as a backup receiver and punt returner. In a game against the Cardinals, he received a pass from quarterback Randall Cunningham, who decided mid-play to pass to Hargrove. Hargrove then ran the ball thirty-four yards for his one and only touchdown.

Hargrove played an additional six games in the 1990 season. His performance was adequate but not remarkable, until his last game. In a game against the Patriots, Hargrove missed two key passes, one of which resulted in an opposing touchdown. Hargrove was benched because of these errors, but his replacement also made significant errors. Hargrove was then brought back into the game, and despite a good punt return, coach Ryan chose to put him on waivers. While Ryan promised to put Hargrove on the team when there next was an opening, an opening never came, ending his NFL career.

== Personal life ==
Hargrove did not drink alcohol, accepting only a Coke at bars and parties. He also did not stay up late at night and never slept around, unlike most other players.

During his time in the NFL, his teammates pranked him by giving him a pill that resulted in blue urine, which the team doctor, who was part of the prank, claimed was a symptom of chlamydia. The team doctor told him that he got it from another player in the locker room and it could be cured by a vasectomy. His teammates shortly after admitted to the prank.
