= Evelyn Lawler =

American hurdler and sprinter (1929–2023)

Personal information
- Born: October 18, 1929 Gadsden, Alabama, U.S.
- Died: January 4, 2023 (aged 93)
- Spouse: William McKinley Lewis (m. 1951; died 1987)
- Children: 4, including Cleveland, Carl, and Carol

Sport
- Sport: Track and field
- Event: 80 meters hurdles

Evelyn Lawler (October 18, 1929 – January 4, 2023) was an American track and field athlete. She competed for the United States in the 80 meters hurdles at the 1951 Pan American Games, finishing 6th, and formerly held the American record in the 80 meters hurdles.

Lawler graduated from Tuskegee University. She started in the sport as a sophomore in high school when her school picked 6 or 7 girls for a start-up track team. Lawler was not selected but watched them practice. She later asked if she could join the team, and beat all the other girls. When her school competed at a meet at Tuskegee, the coach Major Cleveland L. Abbott invited her to come to the university.

Lawler started hurdling when the previous hurdlers including 1948 Olympian Theresa Manuel had graduated and the coach suggested she take up the discipline. Her trip to the Pan Am games in Buenos Aires, Argentina was her first out of the country, the first time on a plane and first national team. By 1952, she had become one of the best three hurdlers in the world, but injuries prevented her from qualifying for the Olympics. She continued to participate in Masters athletics but eventually retired from the sport due to injuries.

Lawler was the mother of multiple Olympic gold medalist Carl Lewis, World Championship bronze medalist and sports announcer Carol Lewis, and professional soccer player Cleveland Lewis.

Lawler died on January 4, 2023, at the age of 93.
