= Anthony Griggs =

American football player (born 1960)

No. 53, 58
- Position: Linebacker

Personal information
- Born: February 12, 1960 (age 66); Lawton, Oklahoma, U.S.
- Listed height: 6 ft 3 in (1.91 m)
- Listed weight: 227 lb (103 kg)

Career information
- High school: John F. Kennedy (Willingboro Township, New Jersey)
- College: Ohio State; Villanova
- NFL draft: 1982: 4th round, 105th overall pick

Career history
- Philadelphia Eagles (1982–1985); Cleveland Browns (1986–1988); Indianapolis Colts (1988)*; Kansas City Chiefs (1989)*
- * Offseason or practice squad member only

Career NFL statistics
- Sacks: 4
- Interceptions: 3
- Fumble recoveries: 2
- Stats at Pro Football Reference

Anthony G. Griggs (born February 12, 1960) is an American former professional football player who was a linebacker in the National Football League (NFL). He played college football for the Ohio State Buckeyes and Villanova Wildcats. Griggs was selected 105th overall by the Philadelphia Eagles in the fourth round of the 1982 NFL draft. He also played for the Cleveland Browns.

Griggs was born in Lawton, Oklahoma. He grew up in Willingboro Township, New Jersey where he played high school football at John F. Kennedy High School.
