= Charles W. Hooper =

United States Army general

Charles Wayne Hooper
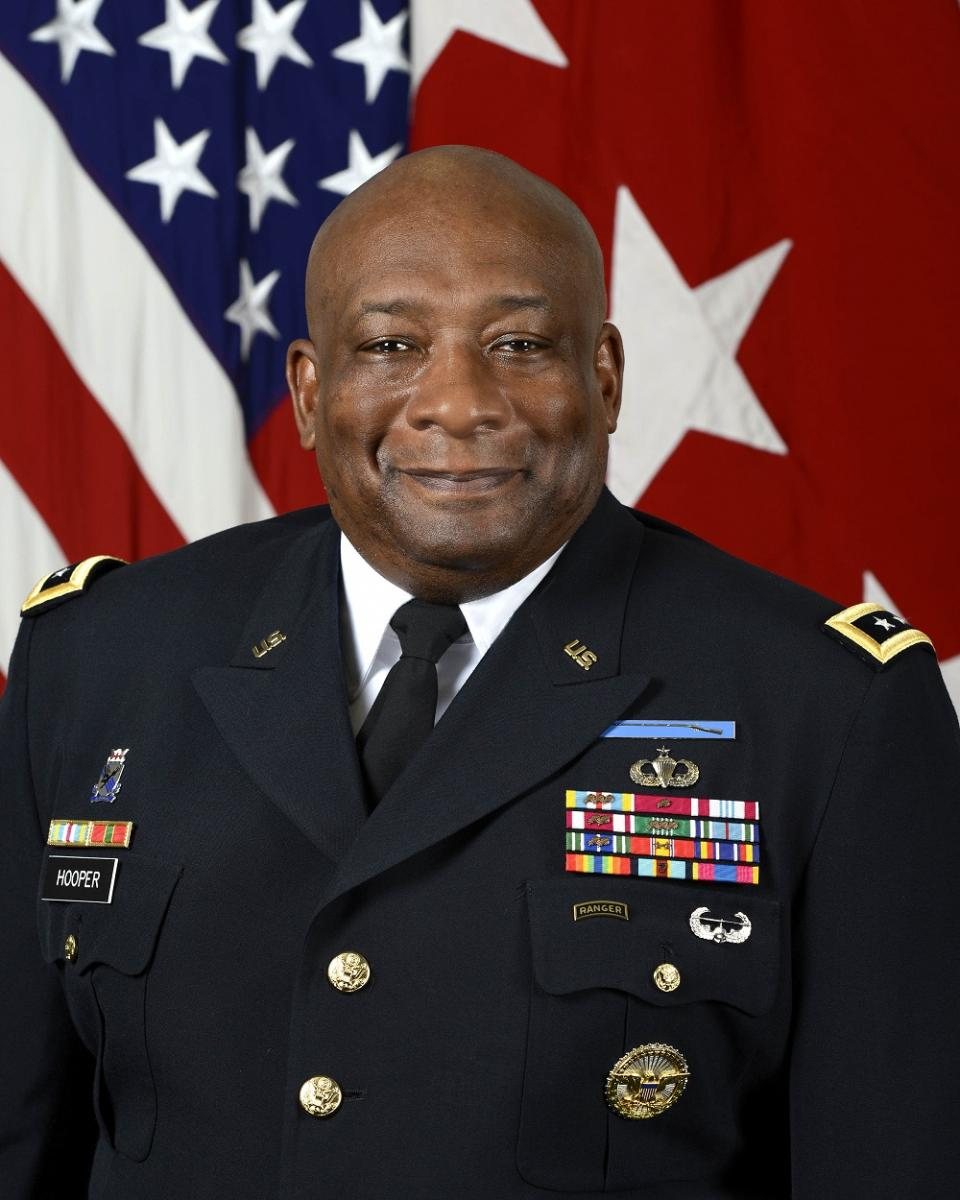
- Born: July 23, 1957 (age 68); New York City, U.S.
- Allegiance: United States
- Branch: United States Army
- Service years: 1979–2020
- Rank: Lieutenant General
- Awards: Defense Distinguished Service Medal; Defense Superior Service Medal (5); Legion of Merit (2); Defense Meritorious Service Medal; French National Defense Medal
- Website: https://www.dsca.mil/

Charles Wayne Hooper (born July 23, 1957) is a retired lieutenant general in the United States Army who held the position of director of the Defense Security Cooperation Agency (DSCA) from 2017 to 2020. DSCA administers security cooperation programs that support U.S. policy interests and objectives identified by the White House, Department of Defense, and Department of State. These objectives include developing specific partner capabilities, building alliances and partnerships, and facilitating U.S. access. DSCA integrates security cooperation activities in support of a whole-of-government approach; provides execution guidance to DoD entities that implement security cooperation programs; exercises financial and program management for the Foreign Military Sales system and many other security cooperation programs; and educates and provides for the long-term development of the security cooperation workforces.

== Early life and education ==
The son of a New York City firefighter and a middle school teacher, Hooper was raised in Willingboro, New Jersey and graduated from John F. Kennedy High School. He received a Bachelor of Science degree from the United States Military Academy at West Point in 1979 and earned a Master of Public Administration (MPA) degree from Harvard University in 1989. While at Harvard's John F. Kennedy School of Government, he was awarded the Don K. Price Award for Academic Excellence and Public Service and was selected to give the graduate student address at the 1989 Harvard University Commencement. In 2005, he returned to Harvard University as a senior research fellow at the Weatherhead Center for International Affairs. He is also a graduate of the U.S. Army War College and the UK Ministry of Defence Chinese Language School, Hong Kong.

== Career ==
Hooper was commissioned from West Point in 1979 as an infantryman. He has served in command and staff assignments in the U.S. Army Armor Center, the 25th Infantry Division, the 82nd Airborne Division and the U.S. Army Recruiting Command. His political-military assignments include: assistant army attaché to the People's Republic of China, U.S. Embassy Beijing, China; deputy division chief, War Plans Division, G35, Army Staff; senior country director for China, Taiwan and Mongolia policy, Office of the Secretary of Defense; chief, Army International Affairs Division, G35, Army Staff; and as an instructor at the Naval Postgraduate School in Monterey, California. Hooper was promoted to brigadier general and appointed the U.S. Defense Attaché to the People's Republic of China. He then served as the Deputy Director for Strategic Planning and Policy, J-5, United States Pacific Command (now Indo-Pacific Command). Hooper was promoted to major general and served as the director of strategy, plans, and programs, J5, United States Africa Command. Following his AFRICOM assignment, Hooper was the senior U.S. Defense official/U.S. Defense attaché and chief, Office of Military Cooperation, U.S. Embassy Cairo, Arab Republic of Egypt.

Hooper was the senior U.S. Army foreign area officer (FAO) and has almost 20 years of security cooperation, security assistance and military attaché experience. He was the first FAO to serve at the DSCA director.

Hooper is fluent in the Mandarin Chinese, the national language of China.

== Bibliography ==
- Going Nowhere Slowly: US-China Military Relations 1994-2001

Military offices
Preceded by Ralph Jodice	Defense Attaché, U.S. Embassy, Beijing; 2007–2009	Succeeded by Bradley R. Gehrke
Preceded by Richard M. Clark	Chief of the Office of Military Cooperation and Senior Defense Official and Defense Attaché to the Cairo; 2012–2014	Succeeded by Ralph H. Groover III
Preceded by Joseph Rixey	Director of the Defense Security Cooperation Agency; 2017–2020	Succeeded by Heidi H. Grant
