= Willingboro Public Library =

Public library

Coordinates: 40.05311°N 74.89022°W

The Willingboro Public Library (WPL), located in Willingboro Township, New Jersey, United States, is the municipal public library for the community of 36,500. It first opened in 1960 and, although in Burlington County, operates independently from the Burlington County Library System. Before 2003, the library was housed in the township's municipal building on Salem Road. The current library building is 42,000 square feet (3,900 m^{2}) and is an anchor for the Willingboro Town Center on Route 130.

== History ==
Within a year of Levittown's creation in Willingboro in 1958, residents started a grassroots effort to create a new public library for their rapidly growing community. The Levittown Civic Association created a committee headed by Catherine Costa to help create a library. The new library's first home was in the basement of St. Paul's Methodist Church on Levitt Parkway. The first books came from the new residents themselves. The Women's Club of Levittown, which disbanded in 2009, conducted a door to door search collecting 2,500 books for the new library. Even Levitt & Sons contributed to the new library by donating $500 to purchase dictionaries and other reference books.

By December 1959, the Levittown Library Association adopted its new by-laws. On January 13, 1960, the Association was legally incorporated. By April 1960, the library moved from the basement of St. Paul's and opened at the Municipal Building on July 12. On November 8, 1960, the new residents of Levittown passed a referendum that the library would be funded by township taxpayers. For its first four years, the library had a part-time director, Frederick R. Hartz. In 1964, Maurice S. Goldman became the first full-time director serving until his retirement in 1995.

The Municipal Building remained the library's home for over 40 years, except for a brief period in the mid-60s. In December 1964, a fire forced the library to find temporary headquarters at the Willingboro Plaza. The library reopened at the new Municipal Building in February 1968 with a 10,250 sq ft (952 m^{2}). facility; enough space for 42,400 books.

== Facilities ==
Overcrowding had been a perennial problem at the Municipal Building library since the early ‘70s. Current library director Christine H. King took her position in 1997 and oversaw the development and construction of a new, state-of-the-art library that opened in October 2003. Named an American Institute of Architects Top Ten Green Project, the new library building is a 70% new construction, 30% renovation of the 1959 Woolworth's building on Route 130. The library has also won a Green Building Award from the Pennsylvania Environmental Council and a Pennsylvania Horticultural Society Greening Community Award.

The library features 30 public access computers, including a computer training center; multiple large and small meeting rooms; a café; an exhibit room and children's reading garden. The library also contains a local history collection for Willingboro. The library provides local programs for the general public, from free computer classes to cultural events.

== Friends of the Library ==
In the fall of 1995, a report from the administration of then-Gov. Christie Whitman recommended that the township merge its independent municipal library with the Burlington County Library System. The proposal was rejected, but out of this discussion, the Friends of the Library was born in March 1996. The Friends, now with over 100 members, raises funds to supplement the library's services. The 2014 current officers [President] Annette Winder, [Vice President] Mattie Mallory, [Secretary]Donna Bullock, & Shirley Dilworth [treasurer]

== Library board ==
The Willingboro Public Library is overseen by a seven-member library board composed of members of the community. Five members are appointed by the Mayor. The remaining two include a representative of the superintendent of schools and a representative of the township manager. Each serves a five-year term and may be re-appointed indefinitely. The current president is Pat Lindsay-Harvey, who has served in that position since 2022.

The library remains independent from the Burlington County Library system; one of three independent municipal libraries in Burlington County. The other two are Mt. Laurel and Moorestown.

== Membership ==
Membership is open to all Willingboro residents or non-resident property owners. It is also free to individuals who work in Willingboro Township. Membership is also free for one year to active duty military personnel. Area residents who don't live in Willingboro can apply for free Internet-Only Cards. Non-residents can pay $35 a year for borrowing privileges; senior non-residents pay $5.

The library is also connected with the Willingboro Campus of the Burlington County College at the Town Center. Students at BCC are entitled to a free library membership for one year.
