= Patrick McFarland =

American basketball player (born 1951)

Personal information
- Born: December 7, 1951 (age 74) Philadelphia, Pennsylvania
- Listed height: 6 ft 5 in (1.96 m)
- Listed weight: 180 lb (82 kg)

Career information
- High school: John F. Kennedy (Willingboro Township, New Jersey)
- College: Saint Joseph's (1970–1973)
- NBA draft: 1973: 2nd round, 28th overall pick
- Drafted by: New York Knicks
- Playing career: 1973–1975
- Position: Shooting guard
- Number: 15

Career history
- 1973–1975: Denver Rockets/Nuggets
- 1975: San Diego Sails

Career highlights
- MAC Player of the Year (1973); 2× First-team All-MAC (1972, 1973)
- Stats at Basketball Reference

Patrick Aloysius McFarland (born December 7, 1951) is an American former professional basketball player. He played in the American Basketball Association (ABA) for the Denver Rockets / Nuggets and San Diego Sails. McFarland scored 947 points in his ABA career.

McFarland grew up in Willingboro Township, New Jersey where he attended John F. Kennedy High School.
