= Carl Lewis Athletics 2000 =

2000 video game

- Developer: Planet Interactive Development
- Publisher: Ubi Soft
- Platform: Game Boy Color
- Release: September 2000
- Genre: Sports
- Mode: Single-player

Carl Lewis Athletics 2000 is a 2000 video game developed by Planet Interactive Development and published in Europe by Ubi Soft for the Game Boy Color. Based on the brand of American athlete Carl Lewis, the game is a track and field sports game in which players compete in various decathlon events.

== Gameplay ==
Gameplay screenshot

Carl Lewis Athletics 2000 is a sports game in which players race against Carl Lewis across 14 track and field events, including decathlon and bonus events including short and long-distance runs, long jump, javelin, hurdles, relay, and unlockable events. The game features a 'Championship' mode, in which players select a character and compete in a series of events, an 'Arcade' mode in which players must perform to a certain level to qualify for the next event, and a 'Training' mode for free play. The game supports local co-operative play with up to two players or networked play using the Game Link Cable. Players are able to transfer record times and data between systems using the infrared port of the Game Boy Color. The game was also one of a number of Ubi Soft games for the platform that utilized the "Ubi Key" feature, allowing players to share data between different games via the system's infrared port and unlock extra content.

== Reception ==
Reception

Review scores
Publication	Score
Computer and Video Games	4/5 stars
Game Boy Xtreme	91%
Nintendo Official Magazine	91%

Carl Lewis Athletics 2000 received praise from several publications. Computer and Video Games highlighted the game's "large, well animated sprites" and "solid gameplay", whilst remarking the game was "slightly repetitive" and critiqued the game's omission of "simultaneous two-player action". Similarly, Total Game Boy praised the game's animations, noting the "realistic effect" of the scrolling gameplay and observing "emotions are simulated brilliantly at the end of each event to depict the mood of the athlete." Nintendo Official Magazine praised the game's "polished animation and superb events." Game Boy Xtreme praised the game as "the best multi-eventer yet."
