= Tony Bellinger =

American soccer player and coach

Personal information
- Full name: Arthur A. Bellinger
- Date of birth: December 8, 1957 (age 68)
- Place of birth: Willingboro Township, New Jersey, United States
- Height: 5 ft 11 in (1.80 m)
- Positions: Midfielder; defender

Senior career*
Years	Team	Apps	(Gls)
1977–1981	Dallas Tornado	114	(0)
1980–1987	St. Louis Steamers (indoor)	265	(48)
1983	Team America	11	(0)
Total		390	(48)

International career
1977–1980	United States	7	(1)
- * Club domestic league appearances and goals

Arthur "Tony" Bellinger (born December 8, 1957) is an American former soccer defender who played both in the North American Soccer League and Major Indoor Soccer League. He also played seven games with the United States men's national soccer team.

== Playing career ==
Bellinger, who grew up in the Southern New Jersey community of Willingboro Township, graduated from JF Kennedy High School in 1977. He immediately turned professional with the Dallas Tornado of the North American Soccer League. Bellinger established himself as one of the top defenders and best American players in the league. In 1980, he signed with the expansion St. Louis Steamers of Major Indoor Soccer League for the 1980-1981 indoor season, returning to the Tornados for the 1981 NASL outdoor season. He forwent the 1982 NASL season, but returned in 1983 with Team America. Team America was an attempt by the U.S. Soccer Federation to create a more stable national team program by entering the national team into the NASL as a franchise. However, the concept failed when Team America stumbled to a 10–20 record and the bottom of the league standings. USSF pulled the national team from the NASL at the end of the season. Bellinger returned to the Steamers and played with them through the end of the 1986–1987 season. In 1987, Bellinger signed a guaranteed contract with the Steamers, but broke his foot and missed the 1987–1988 season. The Steamers folded in 1988 and Bellinger retired from playing professionally to devote himself to coaching.

== National team ==
Bellinger earned seven caps with the U.S. national team from 1977 to 1980. He scored one goal in a 3–1 loss to Guatemala on September 18, 1977, his second game with the national team. Bellinger was a member of the 1980 Olympic team but did not play in Moscow due to the U.S. boycott of the event.

== Coaching ==
Bellinger was the head coach for the Bishop Guertin High School (New Hampshire) boys varsity team until 2010, a position he held for over 15 seasons. He also coaches the NWC (Nashua World Cup) Boys U15 Premier team.
