= David Grimaldi (soccer) =

American soccer player

Personal information
- Date of birth: December 19, 1954 (age 71)
- Place of birth: Fort Eustis, Virginia, U.S.
- Position: Defender

College career
Years	Team	Apps	(Gls)
1973–1977	Rutgers Scarlet Knights		

Senior career*
Years	Team	Apps	(Gls)
1977	Dallas Tornado	0	(0)
1978–1979	Memphis Rogues	7	(0)
1979–1982	Cleveland Force (indoor)	110	(5)
1981	Cleveland Cobras		
- * Club domestic league appearances and goals

David Grimaldi (born December 19, 1954) is an American retired professional soccer defender who spent three seasons in the North American Soccer League, three in the Major Indoor Soccer League and at least one in the American Soccer League. He later served as Deputy Commissioner of MISL and the Commissioner of the National Indoor Soccer League which later became the Major Indoor Soccer League.

Grimaldi attended John F. Kennedy High School in Willingboro Township, New Jersey before entering Rutgers University. He was a four-year soccer player at Rutgers and team captain his junior and senior seasons during which time he was selected as a reserve pool player for the US Olympic Soccer team. In 1977, Grimaldi became the 1st Rutgers soccer player drafted into the professional ranks by Coach Al Miller of the Dallas Tornado who selected him in the first round (fourth overall) of the North American Soccer League college draft. After seeing no first team time during his rookie season with the exception of two international matches against Zenith Leningrad and Monterrey, the Tornado traded Grimaldi to the Memphis Rogues where he played sparingly over two seasons due to multiple knee injuries/surgeries In 1979, Grimaldi moved to indoor soccer with the Cleveland Force of the Major Indoor Soccer League. He spent three seasons with the Force serving as co-captain and captain. In 1981, he returned to outdoor soccer briefly with the Cleveland Cobras of the American Soccer League before retiring in 1982 following his third knee surgery. In 1990 Grimaldi was honored with the retirement of his Rutgers soccer jersey and later named to the Rutgers All Legacy Team.

Grimaldi then entered the business world. Over the years, he worked in various management positions for People Express Airlines, American Express and 10 years with FedEx. He later became Deputy Commissioner of the MISL. In 2009, he was appointed Commissioner of the National Indoor Soccer League. which later was renamed the MISL,

He is now general manager and managing partner of the Harrisburg Heat in the Professional Arena Soccer League.
