= Shalèt Monique =

American actress

- Shalèt Monique at the 2025 Netflix Black Excellence Brunch
- Born: Shalèt Monique Jefferson; Philadelphia, Pennsylvania, U.S.
- Education: Willingboro High School (2006)
- Occupations: Actress, stunt performer, producer, writer
- Years active: 2020–present
- Known for: Straw (2025)

Shalèt Monique (born Shalèt Monique Jefferson) is an American actress, stunt performer, writer, and producer. She portrayed Rayah Dunham in the Tyler Perry film Straw (2025), which won an NAACP Image Award. Her television credits include the HBO miniseries We Own This City. Prior to her acting career, she worked as a special education teacher.

== Early life and education ==
Monique was born in Philadelphia, Pennsylvania and was raised in Willingboro Township, New Jersey, where she graduated from Willingboro High School in 2006. She earned a Bachelor's degree in Special Education and a Master's degree in Educational Leadership and Development.

== Career ==
=== Education and community advocacy ===
Before focusing on acting, Monique worked for more than ten years as a special education teacher. Following her role in the Netflix film Straw, she funded a local food assistance initiative in Clayton County, Georgia in November 2025 to assist families affected by federal SNAP and EBT benefit delays.

=== Film and television acting ===
In 2022, Monique appeared as an FBI agent in the HBO miniseries We Own This City. That same year, she performed stunts in the Marvel Studios film Black Panther: Wakanda Forever.

In 2025, she played bank teller Rayah Dunnam in the Tyler Perry film Straw. Following this, she was cast in the lead role of Lisa Hughes in the Footage Films thriller Leave (2026) alongside Stephen Barrington and V. Bozeman.

== Filmography ==
=== Film ===
Year	Title	Role	Notes
2022	Black Panther: Wakanda Forever	Stunt: FBI Agent	Stunts (uncredited)
2025	Straw	Rayah Dunnnam	Netflix original film
2026	Unrequited	Helen Troy	Tubi original film
2026	Leave	Lisa Hughes	Theatrical leading role

=== Television ===
Year	Title	Role	Notes
2020	Complicated	Chante Reaves	TV series
2021	Jurnee's Revenge	Jurnee Kline	TV series
2022	We Own This City	Te'ana	Recurring role; 3 episodes
2022	BET Her Presents: The Waiting Room	Monique	Episode: "The Pink Fight"
