= Cleveland Lewis =

American soccer player

Cleve Lewis
Personal information
- Full name: Cleveland Lewis
- Date of birth: November 1, 1955 (age 70)
- Place of birth: Birmingham, Alabama, United States
- Position: Forward

Youth career
- 1973: Kennedy High School (Willingboro, NJ)

College career
Years	Team	Apps	(Gls)
1974–1978	Brandeis University		

Senior career*
Years	Team	Apps	(Gls)
1978	Memphis Rogues	3	(0)
1979	New Jersey Americans		
- * Club domestic league appearances and goals

Cleveland "Cleve" Lewis (born November 1, 1955) is an American retired professional soccer player who was the first African American drafted by the North American Soccer League.

== Career ==
Lewis was born November 1, 1955, in Birmingham, Alabama. Raised in Willingboro Township, New Jersey, he attended John F. Kennedy High School, scoring more than 100 goals in his high school career and earning all-state honors as a senior.

Lewis was an All-America selection at Brandeis University and captain of the 1976 NCAA Division III Men's Soccer Championship winning team. He was named MVP of the championship final, scoring both goals, including the golden goal in double overtime. By the time he graduated he was the school's all-time leader in goals with 58.

In January 1978 he was selected by the Soccer Bowl '77 champion, Cosmos in the first round of the NASL's 1978 college draft, but never played for them. Acquired by the Memphis Rogues of the North American Soccer League, he appeared in three regular season matches for Memphis in 1978. He joined the New Jersey Americans of the American Soccer League in 1979. After a brief stay in the preseason camp of the Houston Hurricane in 1980, Lewis decided to retire from professional soccer.

In 1993 he was inducted into the Brandeis University Athletics Hall of Fame as an inaugural member.

== Personal life ==
Lewis is the son of former U.S. hurdler Evelyn Lawler, and the older brother of U.S. Olympic gold medalist Carl Lewis, and U.S. Olympian Carol Lewis. He was named after his mother's Tuskegee University track and field coach, Cleveland Abbott.
