= Carl Lewis =

American track and field athlete (born 1961)

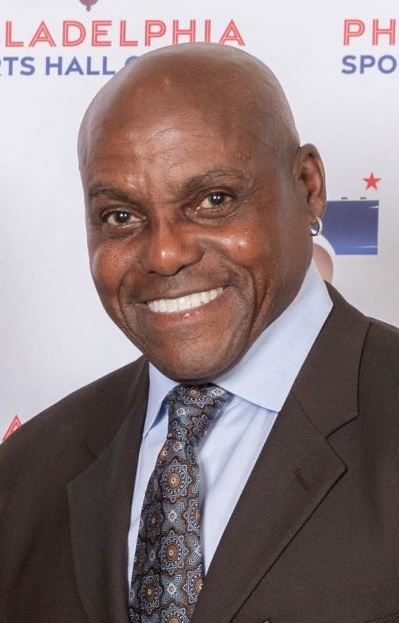
- Lewis in 2023

Personal information
- Full name: Frederick Carlton Lewis
- Nickname: Carl Lewis
- Born: July 1, 1961 (age 65) Birmingham, Alabama, U.S.
- Home town: Willingboro, New Jersey, U.S.
- Height: 6 ft 2 in (188 cm)
- Weight: 176 lb (80 kg)

Sport
- Country: United States
- Sport: Track and field
- Events: 100 meters, 200 meters, long jump, 4 × 100 m relay
- College team: Houston Cougars
- Club: Santa Monica Track Club
- Retired: 1997

Achievements and titles
- Personal bests: 100 m: 9.86 (Tokyo, 1991); 200 m: 19.75 (Indianapolis, 1983); Long jump: 8.87 (8.91* +2.3m/s wind) (Tokyo, 1991)
Medal record
Men's athletics
Representing the United States
International athletics competitions
Event	1st	2nd	3rd
Olympic Games	9	1	0
World Championships	8	1	1
Pan American Games	2	0	1
Goodwill Games	3	1	1
Total	22	3	3
Event	1st	2nd	3rd
100 m	5	1	1
200 m	1	1	1
4 × 100 m relay	8	0	0
Long jump	8	1	1
Olympic Games
Gold medal – first place	1984 Los Angeles	100 m
Gold medal – first place	1984 Los Angeles	200 m
Gold medal – first place	1984 Los Angeles	4 × 100 m relay
Gold medal – first place	1984 Los Angeles	Long jump
Gold medal – first place	1988 Seoul	100 m
Gold medal – first place	1988 Seoul	Long jump
Gold medal – first place	1992 Barcelona	4 × 100 m relay
Gold medal – first place	1992 Barcelona	Long jump
Gold medal – first place	1996 Atlanta	Long jump
Silver medal – second place	1988 Seoul	200 m
World Championships
Gold medal – first place	1983 Helsinki	100 m
Gold medal – first place	1983 Helsinki	4 × 100 m relay
Gold medal – first place	1983 Helsinki	Long jump
Gold medal – first place	1987 Rome	100 m
Gold medal – first place	1987 Rome	4 × 100 m relay
Gold medal – first place	1987 Rome	Long jump
Gold medal – first place	1991 Tokyo	100 m
Gold medal – first place	1991 Tokyo	4 × 100 m relay
Silver medal – second place	1991 Tokyo	Long jump
Bronze medal – third place	1993 Stuttgart	200 m
Pan American Games
Gold medal – first place	1987 Indianapolis	Long jump
Gold medal – first place	1987 Indianapolis	4 × 100 m relay
Bronze medal – third place	1979 San Juan	Long jump
Goodwill Games
Gold medal – first place	1986 Moscow	4 × 100 m relay
Gold medal – first place	1990 Seattle	Long jump
Gold medal – first place	1994 Saint Petersburg	4 × 100 m relay
Silver medal – second place	1990 Seattle	100 m
Bronze medal – third place	1986 Moscow	100 m
Olympic Boycott Games
Gold medal – first place	1980 Philadelphia	4 × 100 m relay
Bronze medal – third place	1980 Philadelphia	Long jump

Frederick Carlton Lewis (born July 1, 1961) is an American former track and field athlete who won nine Olympic gold medals, one Olympic silver medal, and 10 World Championships medals, including eight gold. Lewis was a dominant sprinter and long jumper whose career spanned from 1979 to 1996, when he last won the Olympic long jump. He is one of six athletes to win gold in the same individual event in four consecutive Olympic Games, and is one of two people to win gold in the same individual athletics event in four Olympic Games, along with USA discus thrower Al Oerter. He is the head track and field coach for the University of Houston.

Lewis topped the world rankings in the 100 m, 200 m and long jump events frequently from 1981 to the early 1990s. He set world records in the 100 m, 4 × 100 m and 4 × 200 m relays, while his world record in the indoor long jump has stood since 1984. His 65 consecutive victories in the long jump over a span of ten years is one of the sport's longest undefeated streaks. Lewis broke 10 seconds for the 100 meters fifteen times and 20 seconds for the 200 meters ten times. He also long jumped over 8.53 metres (28 ft) 71 times.

His accomplishments have led to numerous accolades, including being voted "World Athlete of the Century" by the International Association of Athletics Federations, "Sportsman of the Century" by the International Olympic Committee, "Olympian of the Century" by Sports Illustrated and "Athlete of the Year" by Track & Field News in 1982, 1983, and 1984.

After retiring from athletics, Lewis became an actor and has appeared in a number of films. In 2011, he attempted to run for a seat as a Democrat in the New Jersey Senate, but was removed from the ballot due to the state's residency requirement. Lewis owns a marketing and branding company named C.L.E.G., which markets and brands products and services, including his own.

== Athletic career ==
=== Fame as a competitive athlete ===
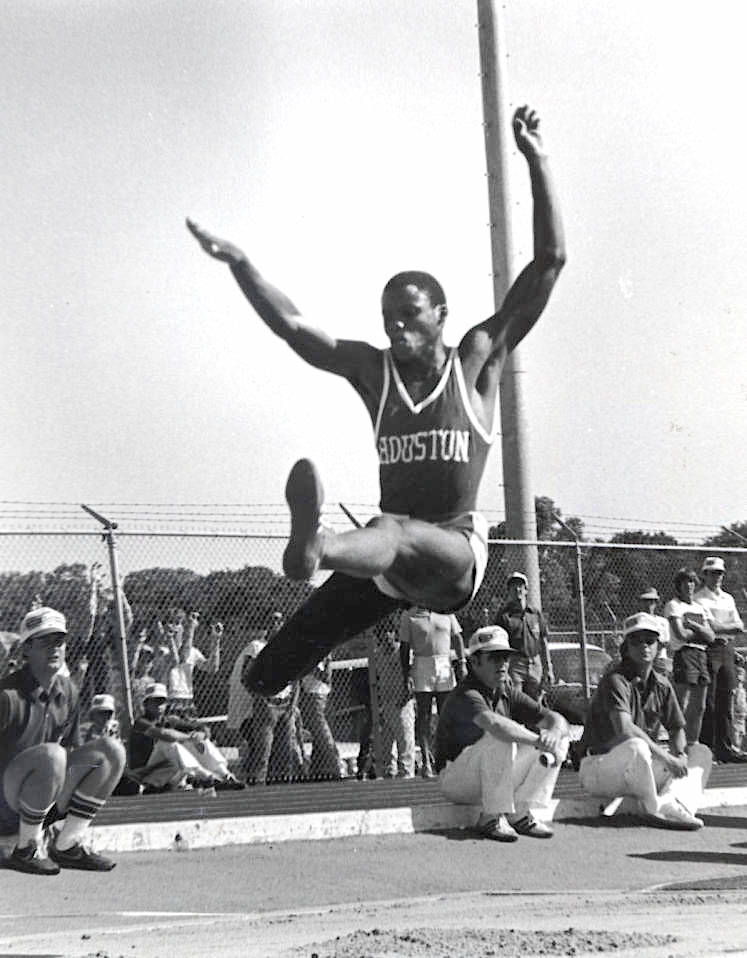
Lewis performing the long jump as a University of Houston college athlete

Frederick Carlton Lewis was born in Birmingham, Alabama, on July 1, 1961, the son of William Lewis (1927–1987) and Evelyn née Lawler Lewis. His mother was a hurdler on the 1951 Pan-Am team. His elder brother Cleveland Lewis played professional soccer for the Memphis Rogues. His parents ran a local athletics club that provided a crucial influence on both him and his sister, Carol. She became an elite long jumper, finishing ninth at the 1984 Olympics and taking bronze at the 1983 World Championships.

Lewis was initially coached by his father, who also coached other local athletes to elite status. At age 13, Lewis began competing in the long jump, and he emerged as a promising athlete while coached by Andy Dudek and Paul Minore at Willingboro High School in his hometown of Willingboro Township, New Jersey. He achieved the ranking of fourth on the all-time World Junior list of long jumpers.

Many colleges tried to recruit Lewis, and he chose to enroll at the University of Houston where Tom Tellez was coach. Tellez would thereafter remain Lewis's coach for his entire career. Days after graduating from high school in 1979, Lewis broke the high school long jump record with a leap of 8.13 m (26 ft 8 in). By the end of 1979, Lewis was ranked fifth in the world for the long jump, according to Track and Field News.

An old knee injury had flared up again at the end of the high school year, and this might have had consequences on his fitness. Lewis worked with Tellez and adapted his technique so that he was able to jump without pain, and he went on to win the 1980 National Collegiate Athletic Association (NCAA) title with a wind-assisted jump of 8.35 m (27 ft 4 1/2 in).

Though his focus was on the long jump, he was now starting to emerge as a talent in the sprints. Comparisons were beginning to be made with Jesse Owens, who dominated sprint and long jump events in the 1930s. Lewis qualified for the American team for the 1980 Olympics in the long jump and as a member of the 4 × 100 m relay team. The Olympic boycott precluded Lewis from competing in Moscow, Russia; he instead participated in the Liberty Bell Classic in July 1980, which was an alternate meet for boycotting nations. He jumped 7.77 m (25 ft 5 3/4 in) for a bronze medal, and the American 4 × 100 m relay team won gold with a time of 38.61 s. He received one of 461 Congressional Gold Medals created specifically for the athletes on the 1980 U.S. Summer Olympics team. At year's end, he was ranked sixth in the world in the long jump and seventh in the 100 m.

=== Breakthrough in 1981 and 1982 ===
At the start of 1981, Lewis's best legal long jump was his high school record from 1979. On June 20, Lewis improved his personal best by almost half a meter by leaping 8.62 m (28 ft 3 1/4 in) at the TAC Championships while still a teenager.

While marks set at the thinner air of high altitude are eligible for world records, Lewis was determined to set his records at sea level. In response to a question about his skipping a 1982 long jump competition at altitude, he said, "I want the record and I plan to get it, but not at altitude. I don't want that '(A)' [for altitude] after the mark." When he gained prominence in the early 1980s, all the extant men's 100 m and 200 m records and the long jump record had been set at the high altitude of Mexico City.

Also in 1981, Lewis became the fastest 100 m sprinter in the world. His relatively modest best from 1979 (10.67 s) improved to a world-class 10.21 the next year. But 1981 saw him run 10.00 s at the Southwest Conference Championships in Dallas on May 16, a time that was the third-fastest in history and stood as the low-altitude record. For the first time, Lewis was ranked number one in the world, in both the 100 m and the long jump. He won his first national titles in the 100 m and long jump. Additionally, he won the James E. Sullivan Award as the top amateur athlete in the United States.

In 1982, Lewis continued his dominance, and for the first time it seemed someone might challenge Bob Beamon's world record of 8.90 m (29 ft 2 1/4 in) in the long jump set at the 1968 Olympics, a mark often described as one of the greatest athletic achievements ever. Before Lewis, 28 ft 0 in (8.53 m) had been exceeded on two occasions by two people: Beamon and 1980 Olympic champion Lutz Dombrowski. During 1982, Lewis cleared 28 ft 0 in (8.53 m) five times outdoors, twice more indoors, going as far as 8.76 m (28 ft 8 3/4 in) at Indianapolis on July 24. He also ran 10.00 s in the 100 m, the world's fastest time, matching his low-altitude record from 1981. He achieved his 10.00 s clocking the same weekend he leapt 8.61 m (28 ft 2 3/4 in) twice, and the day he recorded his new low-altitude record 8.76 m (28 ft 8 3/4 in) at Indianapolis, he had three fouls with his toe barely over the board, two of which seemed to exceed Beamon's record, the third which several observers said reached 30 ft 0 in (9.14 m). Lewis said he should have been credited with that jump, claiming the track officials misinterpreted the rules on fouls.

He repeated his number one ranking in the 100 m and long jump, and ranked number six in the 200 m. Additionally, he was named Athlete of the Year by Track and Field News. From 1981 until 1992, Lewis topped the 100 m ranking six times (seven if Ben Johnson's 1987 top ranking is ignored), and ranked no lower than third. His dominance in the long jump was even greater, as he topped the rankings nine times during the same period, and ranked second in the other years.

=== 1983 and the inaugural World Championships ===
The International Association of Athletics Federations (IAAF), the governing body of track and field, organized the first World Championships in 1983. Lewis' chief rival in the long jump was predicted to be the man who last beat him: Larry Myricks. But though Myricks had joined Lewis in surpassing 28 ft 0 in (8.53 m) the year before, he failed to qualify for the American team, and Lewis won at Helsinki with relative ease. His winning leap of 8.55 m (28 ft 1/2 in) defeated silver medalist Jason Grimes by 0.26 m (10 in).

He also won the 100 m with relative ease. There, Calvin Smith who had earlier that year set a new world record in the 100 m at altitude with a 9.93 s performance, was soundly beaten by Lewis 10.07 s to 10.21 s. Smith won the 200 m title, an event which Lewis had not entered, but even there he was partly in Lewis' shadow as Lewis had set an American record in that event earlier that year. He won the 200 m on June 19 at the TAC/Mobil Championships in 19.75 s, the second-fastest time in history and the low-altitude record, only 0.03 s behind Pietro Mennea's 1979 mark. Observers here noted that Lewis probably could have broken the world record if he did not ease off in the final meters to raise his arms in celebration. Finally, Lewis ran the anchor in the 4 × 100 m relay, winning in 37.86 s, a new world record and the first in Lewis' career.

Lewis' year-best performances in the 100 m and long jump were not at the World Championships, but at other meets. He became the first person to run a sub-10 second 100 m at low-altitude with a 9.97 s in Modesto on May 14. His gold at the World Championships and his other fast times earned him the number one ranking in the world that year, despite Calvin Smith's world record. At the TAC Championships on June 19, he set a new low-altitude record in the long jump, 8.79 m (28 ft 10 in) and earned the world number one ranking in that event. Track and Field News ranked him number two in the 200 m, despite his low-altitude record of 19.75 s, behind Smith, who had won gold at Helsinki. Lewis was again named Athlete of the Year by the magazine.

=== 1984 Summer Olympics: emulating Jesse Owens ===
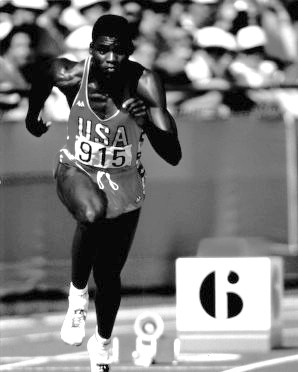
Lewis sprinting at the 1984 Summer Olympics

At the 1984 Olympic Games in Los Angeles, Lewis was entered into four events with realistic prospects of winning each of them and thereby matching the achievement of Jesse Owens at the 1936 Games in Berlin.

Lewis started his quest to match Owens with a convincing win in the 100 m, running 9.99 s to defeat his nearest competitor, fellow American Sam Graddy, by 0.2 s. In his next event, the long jump, Lewis won with relative ease. His behavior in winning this event stoked controversy, even as knowledgeable observers agreed that his tactics were correct. Since Lewis still had heats and finals in the 200 m and the 4 × 100 m relay to compete in, he chose to take as few jumps as necessary to win the event. He risked injury in the cool conditions of the day if he over-extended himself, and his ultimate goal to win four golds might be at risk. He knew that his first jump at 8.54 m (28 ft 0 in) was sufficient to win the event. He fouled on his next jump and then passed on his remaining four allotted jumps. Lewis easily won gold, and Gary Honey of Australia settled for the silver medal with a jump of 8.24 m (27 ft 1/4 in). The public was generally unaware of the intricacies of the sport and had been repeatedly told by the media of Lewis's quest to surpass Bob Beamon's legendary long jump record of 8.90 m (29 ft 2 1/4 in). Lewis himself had often stated it was a goal of his to surpass the mark. A television advertisement with Beamon appeared before the final, featuring the record-holder saying, "I hope you make it, kid." So, when Lewis decided not to make any more attempts to try to break the record, he was loudly booed. When asked about those boos, Lewis said, "I was shocked at first. But after I thought about it, I realized that they were booing because they wanted to see more of Carl Lewis. I guess that's flattering."

His third gold medal came in the 200 m, where he won with a time of 19.80 s, a new Olympic record and the third fastest time in history. Finally, he won his fourth gold in the 4 × 100 m relay when he anchored the final leg of the race; he broke the tape with a time of 37.83 s, setting a new world record.

==== Lack of endorsements and public perception ====
Although Lewis had achieved what he had set out to do, matching Jesse Owens' feat of winning four gold medals in the same events at a single Olympic Games, he did not receive the lucrative endorsement offers that he had expected. The long jump controversy was one reason and his self-congratulatory conduct did not impress several other track stars. Further, Lewis's agent Joe Douglas compared him to pop star Michael Jackson, a comparison which did not go over well. Douglas said he was inaccurately quoted, but the impression that Lewis was aloof and egotistical was firmly planted in the public's perception by the end of the 1984 Olympic Games.

Additionally, rumors circulated at that time that Lewis was gay. Although he denied the rumors, it likely hurt his marketability. Lewis' physical appearance at the Games, with a flattop haircut and flamboyant clothing, added fuel to the reports. "It doesn't matter what Carl Lewis' sexuality is", high jumper Dwight Stones said. "Madison Avenue perceives him as homosexual." Coca-Cola had offered a lucrative deal to Lewis before the Olympics, but Lewis and Douglas turned it down, confident that Lewis would be worth more after the Olympics. But Coca-Cola rescinded the offer after the Games. Nike already had Lewis under contract for several years, despite questions about how it affected his amateur status, and he was appearing in Nike television advertisements in print and on billboards. Nike was faced with Lewis's new negative image and dropped him after the Games. "If you're a male athlete, I think the American public wants you to look macho", said Don Coleman, a Nike representative. "They started looking for ways to get rid of me", Lewis said. "Everyone there was so scared and so cynical they did not know what to do." Lewis and Nike eventually did split, and Lewis signed an endorsement deal with Mizuno. Lewis himself would lay the blame on some inaccurate reporting, especially the "Carl bashing", as he put it, typified by a Sports Illustrated article before the Olympics.

At year's end, Lewis was again awarded the top rankings in the 100 m and the long jump and was additionally ranked number one in the 200 m, and for the third year in a row he was awarded the Athlete of the Year title by Track & Field News.

The Chicago Bulls drafted Lewis in the 1984 NBA draft as the 208th overall pick, although he had played neither high school nor college basketball. Lewis never played in the NBA. A poll on the NBA's website ranked Lewis second to Lusia Harris, the only woman to be drafted by the NBA, as the most unusual pick in the history of the NBA Draft. Ron Weiss, the head West Coast scout of the Bulls, and Ken Passon, the assistant West Coast scout, recommended Lewis because he was the best athlete available. Similarly, Lewis was drafted by the Dallas Cowboys as a wide receiver in the 12th round of the 1984 NFL draft, even though he did not play football in college. He never played in the NFL either.

=== Ben Johnson and the 1987 World Championships ===
After the 1984 Olympics, Lewis continued to dominate track and field, especially in the long jump, in which he would remain undefeated for the next seven years, but others started to challenge his dominance in the 100 m sprint. His low-altitude record had been surpassed by fellow American Mel Lattany with a time of 9.96 s shortly before the 1984 Olympics, but his biggest challenger would prove to be Canadian Ben Johnson, the bronze medalist behind Lewis at the 1984 Olympics. Johnson would beat Lewis once in 1985, but Lewis also lost to others, while winning most of his races. Lewis retained his number one rank that year; Johnson would place second. In 1986, Johnson defeated Lewis convincingly at the Goodwill Games in Moscow, clocking a new low-altitude record of 9.95 s. At year's end, Johnson was ranked number one, while Lewis slipped to number three, having lost more races than he won. He even seemed vulnerable in the long jump, an event he did not lose in 1986, or the year before, though he competed sparingly. Lewis ended up ranked second behind Soviet Robert Emmiyan, who had the longest legal jump of the year at 8.61 m (28 ft 2 3/4 in).

At the 1987 World Championships in Athletics in Rome, Lewis skipped the 200 m to focus on his strongest event, the long jump, and made sure to take all his attempts. This was not to answer critics from the 1984 long jump controversy; this was because history's second 29 ft long-jumper was in the field: Robert Emmiyan leapt 8.86 m (29 ft 3/4 in) at altitude in May, just 4 cm short of Bob Beamon's record. But Emmiyan's best that day was a leap of 8.53 m (27 ft 11 3/4 in), second to Lewis' 8.67 m (28 ft 5 1/4 in). Lewis cleared 8.60 m (28 ft 2 1/2 in) four times. In the 4 × 100 m relay, Lewis anchored the gold-medal team to a time of 37.90 s, the third-fastest of all time.

The 100 m final was the most talked about event and caused the most drama. Johnson had run under 10.00 s three times in the year before Rome, while Lewis had not managed to get under the 10.00 s barrier at all. Lewis looked strong in the heats of the 100 m, setting a Championship record in the semi-final while running into a wind with a 10.03 s effort. In the final, however, Johnson won with a time that stunned observers: 9.83 s, a new world record. Lewis, second with 9.93 s, had tied the existing world record, but that was insufficient.

Video recordings of Lewis' Olympic events from U.S. Information Agency's "Electronic Dialogue" Program Series, released October 28, 1987.

While Johnson basked in the glory of his achievement, Lewis started to explain away his defeat. He first claimed that Johnson had false-started, then he alluded to a stomach virus that had weakened him, and finally, without naming names, said "There are a lot of people coming out of nowhere. I don't think they are doing it without drugs." He added, "I could run 9.8 or faster in the 100 if I could jump into drugs right away." This was the start of Lewis's calling on the sport of track and field to eliminate the illegal use of performance-enhancing drugs. His detractors noted that the problem had been in the sport for many years, and it only became a cause for Lewis once he was actually defeated. In response to the accusations, Johnson replied "When Carl Lewis was winning everything, I never said a word against him. And when the next guy comes along and beats me, I won't complain about that either".

=== 1988 Summer Olympics ===
Lewis not only lost the most publicized showdown in track and field in 1987, he also lost his father. When William Lewis died of cancer at age 60, Lewis placed the gold medal he won for the 100 m in 1984 in his hand to be buried with him. "Don't worry", he told his mother. "I'll get another one." Lewis repeatedly referred to his father as a motivating factor for the 1988 season. "A lot happened to me last year, especially the death of my father. That caused me to re-educate myself to being the very best I possibly can be this season", he said, after defeating Johnson in Zürich on August 17.

At the Olympic trials in Indianapolis, Lewis won the 100 m finals in 9.78 s, which appeared to be a new world record. However, the race was determined to have been wind-aided, so the record did not count.

The 100 m final at the 1988 Summer Olympics was one of the most sensational sports stories of the year and its unexpected outcome would rank as one of the most infamous sports stories of the century. In the Olympic finals, Johnson won in 9.79 s, a new world record, while Lewis set a new American record with 9.92 s. Three days later, Johnson tested positive for steroids, his medal was taken away and Lewis was awarded gold and credited with a new Olympic record.

In the long jump, Robert Emmiyan withdrew from the competition citing an injury, and Lewis's main challengers were rising American long jump star Mike Powell and long-time rival Larry Myricks. Lewis leapt 8.72 m (28 ft 7 1/4 in), a low-altitude Olympic best, and none of his competitors could match it. The Americans swept the medals in the event for the first time in 84 years. In the 200 m, Lewis dipped under his Olympic record from 1984, running 19.79 s, but did so in second place to Joe DeLoach, who claimed the new record and Olympic gold in 19.75 s. In the final event he entered, the 4 × 100 m relay, Lewis never made it to the track as the Americans fumbled an exchange in a heat and were disqualified.

A subsequent honor would follow: Lewis eventually was credited with the 100 m world record for the 9.92 s he ran in Seoul. Though Ben Johnson's 9.79 s time was never ratified as a world record, the 9.83 s he ran the year before was. However, in the fallout to the steroid scandal, an inquiry was called in Canada wherein Johnson admitted under oath to long-time steroid use. The IAAF subsequently stripped Johnson of his record and gold medal from the World Championships. Lewis was deemed to be the world record holder for his 1988 Olympic performance and declared the 1987 100 m World Champion. The IAAF also declared that Lewis had also, therefore, twice tied the "true" world record (9.93 s) for his 1987 World Championship performance, and again at the 1988 Zürich meet where he defeated Johnson. However, those times were never ratified as records. From January 1, 1990, Lewis was the world record holder in the 100 m. The record did not last long, as fellow American and University of Houston teammate Leroy Burrell ran 9.90 s on June 14, 1991, to break Lewis's mark. Lewis also permanently lost his ranking as number one for the 200 m in 1988 and for the 100 m in 1989. He also lost the top ranking for the long jump in 1990 but was able to regain it in 1992.

=== 1991 World Championships: Lewis' greatest performances ===
Tokyo was the venue for the 1991 World Championships. In the 100 m final, Lewis faced the two men who ranked number one in the world the past two years: Burrell and Jamaican Raymond Stewart. In what would be the deepest 100 meters race ever to that time, with six men finishing in under ten seconds, Lewis not only defeated his opponents, he reclaimed the world record with a clocking of 9.86 s. Though previously a world-record holder in this event, this was the first time he had crossed the line with "WR" beside his name on the giant television screens, and the first time he could savor his achievement at the moment it occurred. He could be seen with tears in his eyes afterwards. "The best race of my life", Lewis said. "The best technique, the fastest. And I did it at thirty." Lewis's world record would stand for nearly three years. Lewis also anchored the 4 × 100 m relay team to another world record, 37.50 s, the third time that year he had anchored a 4 × 100 m squad to a world record.

==== Long jump showdown versus Powell ====
The 1991 World Championships are perhaps best remembered for the long jump final, considered by some to have been one of the greatest competitions ever in any sport. Lewis was up against his main rival of the last few years, Mike Powell, the silver medalist in the event from the 1988 Olympics and the top-ranked long jumper of 1990. Lewis had at that point not lost a long jump competition in a decade, winning the 65 consecutive meets in which he competed. Powell had been unable to defeat Lewis, despite sometimes putting in jumps near world-record territory, only to see them ruled fouls or, as with other competitors such as Larry Myricks, putting in leaps that Lewis himself had only rarely surpassed, only to see Lewis surpass them on his next or final attempt.

Lewis' first jump was 8.68 m (28 ft 5 1/2 in), a World Championship record, and a mark bested by only three others beside Lewis all-time. Powell, jumping first, had faltered in the first round, but jumped 8.54 m (28 ft 0 in) to claim second place in the second round. Lewis jumped 8.83 m (28 ft 11 1/2 in), a wind-aided leap, in the third round, a mark that would have won all but two long jump competitions in history. Powell responded with a long foul, estimated to be around 8.80 m (28 ft 10 1/4 in). Lewis's next jump made history: the first leap ever beyond Bob Beamon's record. The wind gauge indicated the jump was wind-aided, so it could not be considered a record, but it would still count in the competition. 8.91 m (29 ft 2 3/4 in) was the greatest leap ever under any condition.

In the next round, Powell responded. His jump was measured as 8.95 m (29 ft 4 1/4 in); this time, his jump was not a foul, and with a wind gauge measurement of 0.3 m/s, well within the legal allowable for a record. Powell had not only jumped 4 cm further than Lewis, he had eclipsed the 23-year-old mark set by Bob Beamon and done so at low altitude. Lewis still had two jumps left, although he was now no longer chasing Beamon, but Powell. He leaped 8.87 m (29 ft 1 in), which was a new personal best under legal wind conditions, then a final jump of 8.84 m (29 ft 0 in). He thus lost his first long jump competition in a decade. Powell's 8.95 m (29 ft 4 1/4 in) and Lewis's final two jumps still stand, as of September 2025, as the top three low altitude jumps ever. The farthest anyone has jumped since under legal conditions is 8.74 m (28 ft 8 in).

Lewis' reaction to what was one of the greatest competitions ever in the sport was to offer acknowledgment of the achievement of Powell. "He just did it", Lewis said of Powell's winning jump. "It was that close, and it was the best of his life." Powell did jump as far or farther on two subsequent occasions, though both were wind-aided jumps at altitude: 8.99 m (29 ft 5 3/4 in) in 1992 and 8.95 m (29 ft 4 1/4 in) in 1994. Lewis's best subsequent results were two wind-aided leaps at 8.72 m (28 ft 7 1/4 in), and an 8.68 m (28 ft 5 1/2 in) under legal conditions while in the qualifying rounds at the Barcelona Olympics.

In reference to his efforts at the 1991 World Championships, Lewis said, "This has been the greatest meet that I've ever had." Track and Field News was prepared to go even further than that, suggesting that after these Championships, "It had become hard to argue that he is not the greatest athlete ever to set foot on track or field." Lewis's 1991 outstanding results earned him the ABC's Wide World of Sports Athlete of the Year, an award he shared with gymnastics star Kim Zmeskal.

=== Final years and retirement ===
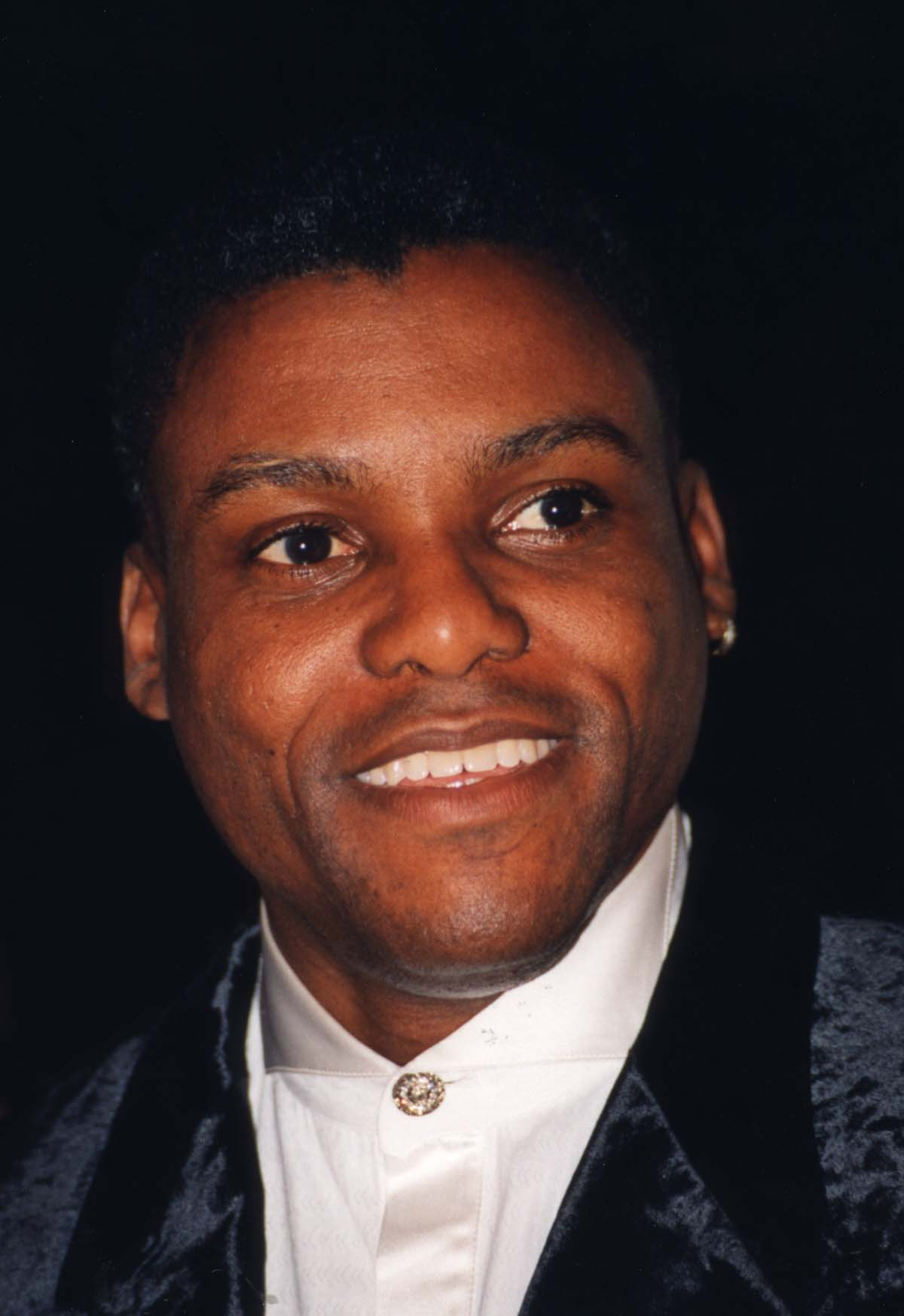
Lewis in Washington, D.C. in 1996

After the heights reached in 1991, Lewis started to lose his dominance in both the sprints and the long jump.

He anchored a world record 1:19.11 in the rarely run 4 × 200 m relay with the Santa Monica Track Club early in 1992, however he failed to qualify for the Olympic team in the 100 m or 200 m. In the latter race, he finished fourth at the Olympic trials behind rising star Michael Johnson who set a personal best of 19.79 s. It was the first time the two had ever met on the track. Lewis did, however, qualify for the long jump, finishing second behind Powell, and was eligible for the 4 × 100 m relay team.

At the Barcelona Olympics in 1992, Lewis jumped 8.67 m (28 ft 5 1/4 in) in the first round of the long jump, beating Powell who did a final-round 8.64 m (28 ft 4 in). In the 4 × 100 m relay, Lewis anchored another world record, in 37.40 s, a time which stood for 16 years. He covered the final leg in 8.85 seconds, the fastest officially recorded anchor leg.

Lewis competed at the 4th World Championships in Stuttgart in 1993, but finished fourth in the 100 m, and did not compete in the long jump. He did, however, earn his first World Championship medal in the 200 m, a bronze with his 19.99 s performance. That medal would prove to be his final Olympic or World Championship medal in a running event. Injuries kept Lewis largely sidelined for the next few years, then he made a comeback for the 1996 season.

In 1996, Lewis qualified for the Olympic team in the long jump for the fifth time, the first time an American man has done so. At the 1996 Olympics, injuries to world-record holder Mike Powell and the leading long-jumper in the world, Iván Pedroso, affected their performances. Lewis, on the other hand, was in good form. Though he did not match past performances, his third-round leap of 8.50 m (27 ft 10 1/2 in) won gold by 0.21 m (8 1/4 in) over second-place finisher James Beckford of Jamaica. He became the third Olympian to win the same individual event four times, joining Danish sailor Paul Elvstrøm and American discus thrower Al Oerter; the three would be joined by American swimmer Michael Phelps in 2016 and swimmer Katie Ledecky in 2024. Lewis's nine gold medals also tie him for second on the list of multiple Olympic gold medalists with Paavo Nurmi, Larisa Latynina, Mark Spitz and Katie Ledecky behind Phelps.

Lewis' 8.50 m (27 ft 10 1/2 in) jump was also officially declared tied with Larry Myricks for the masters record for the 35–39 age group.

Controversy struck when, as Track and Field News put it, "Lewis' attitude in the whole relay hoo-hah a few days later served only to take the luster off his final gold." After Lewis's unexpected long jump gold, it was noted that he could become the athlete with the most Olympic gold medals if he entered the 4 × 100 m relay team. Any member of the American Olympic men's track and field team could be used, even if they had not qualified for the relay event. Lewis said, "If they asked me, I'd run it in a second. But they haven't asked me to run it." He further suggested on Larry King Live that viewers phone the United States Olympic Committee to weigh in on the situation. Lewis had skipped the mandatory relay training camp and demanded to run the anchor leg, which added to the debate. The final decision was to exclude Lewis from the team. Olympic team coach Erv Hunt said, "The basis of their [the relay team's] opinion was 'We want to run, we worked our butts off and we deserve to be here.'" The American relay team finished second behind Canada.

Lewis retired from track and field in 1997.

== Drug testing exoneration ==
In 2003, Wade Exum, the United States Olympic Committee's director of drug control administration from 1991 to 2000, gave copies of documents to Sports Illustrated that revealed that some 100 American athletes had failed drug tests from 1988 to 2000, arguing that they should have been prevented from competing in the Olympics but were nevertheless cleared to compete. Before showing the documents to Sports Illustrated, Exum tried to use them in a lawsuit against USOC, accusing the organization of racial discrimination and wrongful termination against him and cover-up over the failed tests. His case was summarily dismissed by the Denver federal Court for lack of evidence. The USOC claimed his case "baseless" as he himself was the one in charge of screening the anti-doping test program of the organization and clarifying that the athletes were cleared according to the rules.

Lewis was among the named athletes and Exum's documents revealed that at the 1988 Olympics trials he had three positive results on a combined test for pseudoephedrine, ephedrine, and phenylpropanolamine. All were and are banned in sport due to their activity as stimulants, though at the time all three were available over-the-counter as dietary supplements or treatments for cold and allergy symptoms. The combined concentrations of these stimulants detected in the three successive tests were 2 ppm, 4 ppm and 6 ppm.

Lewis defended himself, claiming that he had accidentally consumed the banned substances. After the supplements that he had taken were analyzed to prove his claims, the USOC accepted his claim of inadvertent use, since a dietary supplement he ingested was found to contain ma huang, the Chinese name for Ephedra sinica, an ephedrine-bearing plant which was then marketed as a weight loss aid. Fellow Santa Monica Track Club teammates Joe DeLoach and Floyd Heard were also found to have the same banned stimulants in their systems, and were cleared to compete for the same reason.

The highest level of the stimulants Lewis recorded was 6 ppm, which was regarded as a positive test in 1988. According to the IOC rules at the time, positive tests with levels lower than 10 ppm were cause of further investigation but not immediate ban. Neal Benowitz, a professor of medicine at UC San Francisco who is an expert on ephedrine and other stimulants, agreed in 2003 that "These [levels] are what you'd see from someone taking cold or allergy medicines and are unlikely to have any effect on performance."

Following Exum's revelations the IAAF affirmed that at the 1988 Olympic Trials the USOC indeed followed the correct procedures in dealing with eight positive findings for ephedrine and ephedrine-related compounds in low concentration. The federation also reviewed in 1988 the relevant documents with the athletes' names undisclosed and stated that "the medical committee felt satisfied, however, on the basis of the information received that the cases had been properly concluded by the USOC as 'negative cases' in accordance with the rules and regulations in place at the time and no further action was taken".

"Carl did nothing wrong. There was never intent. He was never told 'you violated the rules,'" said Martin D. Singer, Lewis's lawyer, who also said that Lewis had inadvertently taken the banned stimulants in an over-the-counter herbal remedy. In an April 2003 interview, Lewis agreed that he tested positive three times in 1988 but he was let off as that was the normal practice in those times. "The only thing I can say is I think it's unfortunate what Wade Exum is trying to do", said Lewis. "I don't know what people are trying to make out of nothing because everyone was treated the same, so what are we talking about? I don't get it."

== Achievements and honors ==
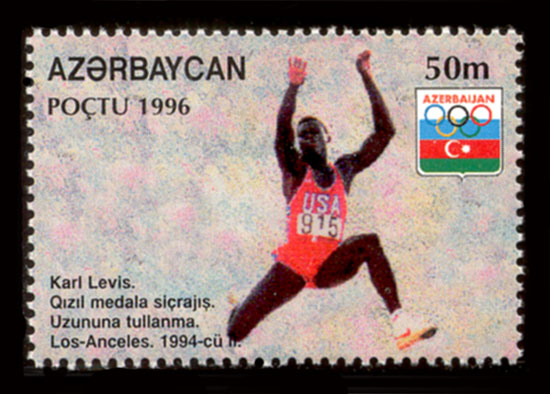
An Azerbaijan stamp honoring Lewis, issued in 1996

- Lewis was the only man to successfully defend an Olympic long jump title until the 2024 Olympics, when Miltos Tentoglou became the second to achieve it. Lewis is still the only one to defend the title three times (four gold medals in four consecutive Olympics).
- Outdoors, Lewis jumped 14 of the 20 furthest ancillary jumps of all time. (Ancillary marks are those that are valid, but were not the furthest in a series.)

=== Personal best marks ===
- 100 m: 9.86 s (August 1991, Tokyo)
- 200 m: 19.75 s (June 1983, Indianapolis)
- Long jump: 8.87 m (29 ft 1 in) 1991, 8.91 m (29 ft 2 3/4 in) 1991 (both in Tokyo)
- 4 × 100 m relay: 37.40 s (United States – Marsh; Burrell; Mitchell; Lewis – August 1992, Barcelona)
- 4 × 200 m relay: 1:18.68 min (Santa Monica Track Club – Marsh; Burrell; Heard; Lewis – 1994; (former world record)

=== Honors ===
In 1999, Lewis was voted "Sportsman of the Century" by the International Olympic Committee, elected "World Athlete of the Century" by the International Association of Athletics Federations and named "Olympian of the Century" by Sports Illustrated. In 2000 his alma mater University of Houston named the Carl Lewis International Complex after him.

In 2010, Lewis was inducted into the New Jersey Hall of Fame.

In 2016, Lewis was inducted into the Texas Track and Field Coaches Association Hall of Fame.

=== Awards ===
- World Athletics Awards
  - 2× World Athlete of the Year (Men)：1988, 1991
- 3× L'Équipe Champion of Champions: 1983, 1984, 1991
- 2× Associated Press Athlete of the Year: 1983, 1984
- 2× United Press International Athlete of the Year: 1983, 1984
- USOC SportsMan of the Year: 1991
- James E. Sullivan Award: 1981
- Gazzetta Sports Awards
  - 4× World Sportsman of the Year: 1983, 1984, 1988, 1991
- Track & Field News
  - 3× World Athlete of the Year: 1982, 1983, 1984
  - 7× U.S. Athlete of the Year: 1981, 1982, 1983, 1984, 1987, 1988, 1991

== Career after retiring from athletics ==
=== Film and television ===
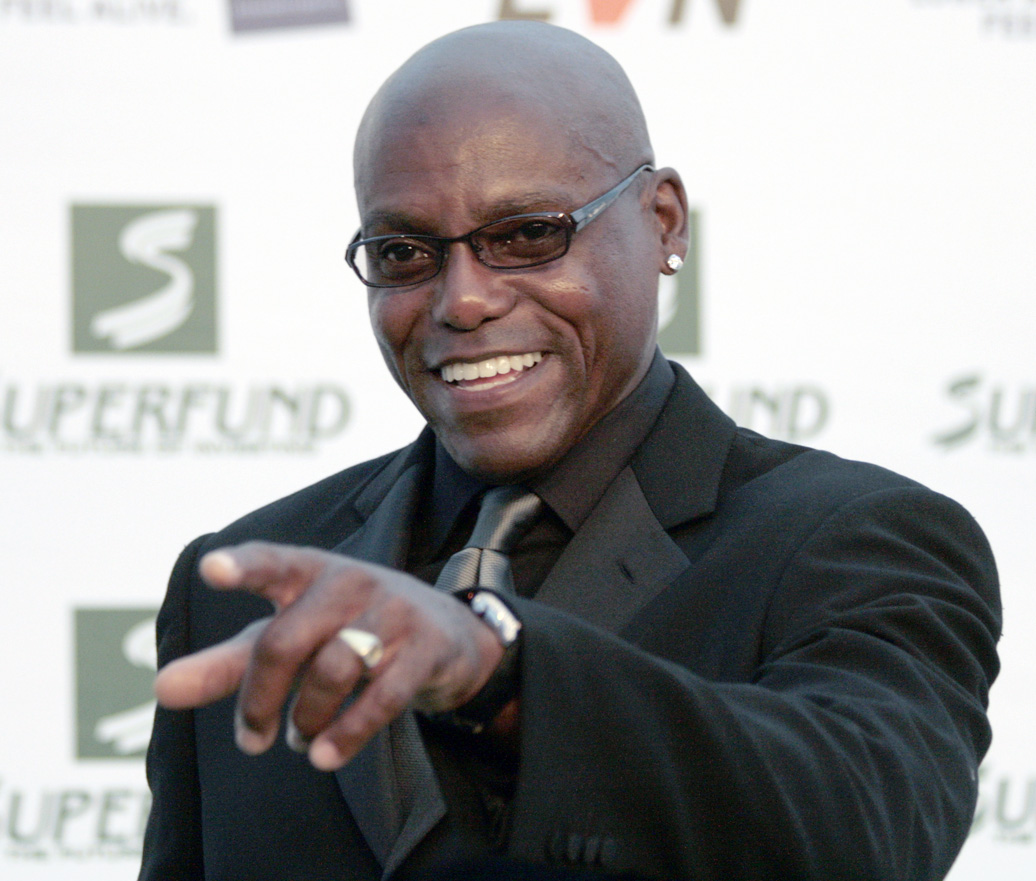
Lewis in July 2009

Lewis has appeared in numerous films and television productions. Among them, he played himself in cameos in Perfect Strangers, Speed Zone, Alien Hunter and Material Girls. He made an appearance on The Weakest Link. He also played Stu in the made-for-TV movie Atomic Twister.

In 2011, Lewis appeared in the short documentary Challenging Impossibility which features the feats of strength demonstrated by the late spiritual teacher and peace advocate Sri Chinmoy. Lewis also appeared in the film The Last Adam (2006).

In 2024, Lewis appeared in the fourth season of Mask Singer: Adivina quién canta, the Spanish version of Masked Singer, under the Panda mask. He was eliminated in the season premiere.

=== Bid for New Jersey State Senate ===
On April 11, 2011, Lewis filed petitions to run as a Democrat for the New Jersey Senate in the state's 8th legislative district in Burlington County. Two weeks later he was disqualified by Lieutenant Governor and secretary of state Kim Guadagno, as he did not meet the state's requirement that Senate candidates live in New Jersey for four years. Lewis appealed his decision to the Third Circuit Court of Appeals; the court initially granted his appeal but a few days later the court reversed itself and Lewis withdrew his name.

=== Coaching ===
As of 2025, Lewis serves as the head track and field coach at his alma mater, the University of Houston. He was elevated from assistant coach in 2023.

== Personal life ==
In the 2025 documentary I'm Carl Lewis, Lewis revealed that he had never been in a long-term relationship out of fear that it would have affected his professional aspirations. He has a son named Bakim ("Blew"), who is a director and videographer and lives in Houston.

Lewis became a vegan in 1990 and has credited his outstanding 1991 results in part to his vegan diet. He has said that it is better suited to him because he can eat a larger quantity without affecting his athleticism, and he believes that switching to a vegan diet can lead to improved athletic performance.

At a 2019 Pan American Games news conference, and in the aftermath of the deadly El Paso and Dayton shootings, Lewis called then‑U.S. President Donald Trump "a racist who is prejudiced, misogynistic, who doesn't value anyone outside of himself". Lewis later endorsed Kamala Harris in the 2024 United States presidential election.

== See also ==
- Carl Lewis Athletics 2000, a video game
- List of vegans
- List of multiple Olympic gold medalists
- List of multiple Olympic gold medalists at a single Games
- List of multiple Olympic gold medalists in one event
- 100 metres at the World Championships in Athletics
- List of multiple Summer Olympic medalists

Records
Preceded by Calvin Smith; Leroy Burrell	Men's 100m World Record Holder; August 30, 1987 – June 14, 1991; August 25, 1991 – July 6, 1994	Succeeded by Leroy Burrell; Leroy Burrell
Preceded by Larry Myricks	Men's Long Jump Indoor World Record Holder; February 20, 1981 – present	Incumbent
Preceded by Mark Spitz	Athletes with the most gold medals at Olympic Games; July 29, 1996 – August 13, 2008	Succeeded by Michael Phelps
Awards and achievements
Preceded by Sebastian Coe	Men's Track & Field Athlete of the Year; 1982–1984	Succeeded by Saïd Aouita
Preceded by Daley Thompson	United Press International Athlete of the Year; 1983, 1984	Succeeded by Steve Cram
Preceded by John T. Smith	USOC Sportsman of the Year; 1991	Succeeded by Pablo Morales
Preceded by Paolo Rossi; Ayrton Senna	L'Équipe Champion of Champions; 1983, 1984; 1991	Succeeded by Sergei Bubka; Michael Jordan
Preceded by Jimmy Connors	BBC Overseas Sports Personality of the Year; 1983	Succeeded by Seve Ballesteros
Preceded by Hassiba Boulmerka	Prince of Asturias Award for Sports; 1996	Succeeded by Spanish Marathon team
Sporting positions
Preceded by Lutz Dombrowski	Men's Long Jump Best Year Performance; 1981–1985	Succeeded by Robert Emmiyan
Preceded by Mike Miller	Men's 200 m Best Year Performance; 1983–1984	Succeeded by Lorenzo Daniel
Preceded by Floyd Heard	Men's 200 m Best Year Performance; 1987	Succeeded by Joe DeLoach
Preceded by Robert Emmiyan	Men's Long Jump Best Year Performance; 1988	Succeeded by Larry Myricks
Preceded by Mike Powell	Men's Long Jump Best Year Performance; 1992	Succeeded by Mike Powell
