= Carol Lewis =

American former track and field athlete (born 1963)

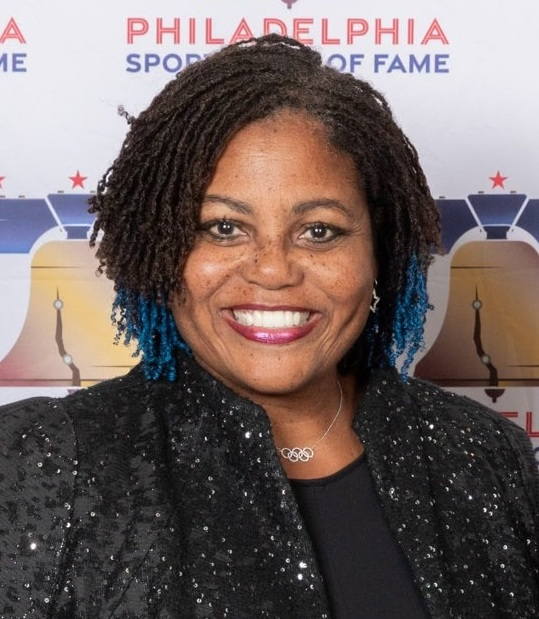
- Lewis in 2023

Personal information
- Full name: Carol LeGrant Lewis
- Born: August 8, 1963 (age 62) Birmingham, Alabama, U.S.
- Height: 5 ft 10 in (1.78 m)
- Weight: 159 lb (72 kg)

Sport
- Sport: Track and field
- Club: Santa Monica Track Club
Medal record
Representing United States
World Championships
Bronze medal – third place	1983 Helsinki	Long jump
World Cup
Bronze medal – third place	1985 Canberra	Long jump
Liberty Bell Classic
Silver medal – second place	1980 Philadelphia	Long jump
Pan American Junior Championships
Silver medal – second place	1980 Sudbury	100 m hurdles
Summer Universiade
Gold medal – first place	1981 Bucharest	4x100m relay

Carol LeGrant Lewis (born August 8, 1963) is an American former track and field athlete who specialized in the long jump. She is the 1983 World Championship bronze medalist, and a 4-time US Champion. Her best long jump of 7.04 meters in 1985 is the former American record. She is the sister of nine-time Olympic gold medalist Carl Lewis, and former professional soccer player Cleveland Lewis. She is also the daughter of the late American hurdler Evelyn Lawler.

== Career ==
Born in Birmingham, Alabama, Lewis qualified for the 1980 U.S. Olympic team but was unable to compete due to the 1980 Summer Olympics boycott. She received one of the 461 Congressional Gold Medals created especially for the spurned athletes. She first competed internationally at the Liberty Bell Classic, an alternate event for boycotted athletes, where she won a silver medal with a jump of 6.60 meters. She won the Dial Award that year in recognition of her achievements. While at Willingboro High School in New Jersey, setting the high school indoor long jump record at 21 ft 7.5 in (6.591 m) in 1981. She later went to the University of Houston, following in the footsteps of her older brother. At Houston, she won 2 National Collegiate Athletic Association long jump championship titles in 1983: 21-11 3/4 and 1985: 22-1 She also joined her brother on the Santa Monica Track Club.

Lewis won the USA Outdoor Track and Field Championships for the first time in 1982, the first of four National championships. Her 6.81m jump from that competition is the current United States, North American and Pan American Junior record. Further success came in 1983, with a win at the NCAA Outdoor Championships and bronze medal at the 1983 World Championships in Athletics.

After winning the Olympic Trials, she represented the United States at the 1984 Summer Olympics and managed to finish in ninth place at the age of twenty. The following year she won the NCAA Outdoor Championships for a second time and took bronze at the World Cup in Athletics. In Zürich in August that year, Lewis reached her peak, setting a personal best and breaking the American record in the long jump twice at the same track meeting. Her record of 7.04 m stood for two years until it was beaten by Jackie Joyner-Kersee.

Lewis competed at the 1987 IAAF World Indoor Championships, finishing in ninth position with a best jump of 6.23 m. She qualified for her third Olympics in 1988, failing to qualify for the final by just one centimeter.

Following her retirement from track and field, she went on to work as a commentator for various events for NBC Sports. She commentated on the track events for the 1996, 2000 and 2008 Summer Olympics.

In 2000, Lewis began competing in two-woman bobsled and, although she failed to make the 2002 US Olympic team, she served as Shauna Rohbock's brakeman at the 2002 World Cup in Calgary.

== Personal bests ==
Event	Date	Venue	Mark
Long jump	August 21, 1985	Zürich, Switzerland	7.04 meters (AR 1985–1987)

- All information taken from IAAF Profile.

== National titles ==
- 4-time United States long jump champion – 1982, 1983, 1985 and 1986
- 4-time United States Indoor long jump champion –1983, 1984, 1985 and 1991
- 2-time NCAA long jump champion – 1983 and 1985

== International competitions ==
Year	Competition	Venue	Position	Event	Notes
Representing United States
1980	Liberty Bell Classic	Philadelphia, United States	2nd	Long jump	6.60 m
1980	Pan American Junior Championships	Sudbury, Canada	2nd	100 m hurdles	14.62
1983	World Championships	Helsinki, Finland	3rd	Long jump	7.00 m
1984	Olympic Games	Los Angeles, United States	9th	Long jump	6.43 m
1985	Grand Prix Final	Rome, Italy	3rd	Long jump	6.73 m
1985	World Cup	Canberra, Australia	3rd	Long jump	6.88 m
1987	World Indoor Championships	Indianapolis, United States	9th	Long jump	6.23 m
1988	Olympic Games	Seoul, South Korea	13th (q)	Long jump	6.47 m
Results with (q) indicate overall position in qualifying round
