= Willingboro Public Schools =

School district in Burlington County, New Jersey General Assembly

Address
- 440 Beverly-Rancocas Road Willingboro Township, Burlington County, New Jersey, 08046; United States
- Coordinates: 40.019178°N 74.894049°W

District information
- Grades: Pre-K to 12
- Superintendent: Malcolm X. Outlaw
- Business administrator: Steven Lewis
- Schools: 8

Students and staff
- Enrollment: 3,456 (as of 2020–21)
- Faculty: 277.0 FTEs
- Student–teacher ratio: 12.5:1

Other information
- District Factor Group: DE
- Website: www.willingboroschools.org
Ind.	Per pupil	District spending	Rank (*)	K-12 average	%± vs. average
1A	Total Spending	$19,414	67	$18,891	2.8%
1	Budgetary Cost	15,007	61	14,783	1.5%
2	Classroom Instruction	8,598	50	8,763	−1.9%
6	Support Services	2,201	47	2,392	−8.0%
8	Administrative Cost	1,704	89	1,485	14.7%
10	Operations & Maintenance	2,225	90	1,783	24.8%
13	Extracurricular Activities	250	51	268	−6.7%
16	Median Teacher Salary	59,452	25	64,043
Data from NJDoE 2014 Taxpayers' Guide to Education Spending. *Of K-12 districts with more than 3,500 students. Lowest spending=1; Highest=103

Willingboro Public Schools is a comprehensive community public school district that serves students in pre-kindergarten through twelfth grade from Willingboro Township, in Burlington County, in the U.S. state of New Jersey.

As of the 2020–21 school year, the district, comprising nine schools, had an enrollment of 3,456 students and 277.0 classroom teachers (on an FTE basis), for a student–teacher ratio of 12.5:1.

The district is classified by the New Jersey Department of Education as being in District Factor Group "DE", the fifth-highest of eight groupings. District Factor Groups organize districts statewide to allow comparison by common socioeconomic characteristics of the local districts. From lowest socioeconomic status to highest, the categories are A, B, CD, DE, FG, GH, I and J.

== History ==
During the early development of the township, all high school students attended Levittown High School for grades 9-12 (LHS was renamed "Levitt Jr. High School" when the new high school - John F. Kennedy - was opened in 1964). It was the only junior high school, grades 7 through 9, until Memorial Junior High School opened in 1968. The substantial student population at JFK HS required that the school go to split sessions and only was able to house grades 10–12, with the freshmen classes divided between Memorial and Levitt junior high schools. In 1975, Willingboro HS was opened and became the "sister" school, located only about two miles apart - both on JFK Way. This is the way the township was until JFK HS became a middle school in 1990, leaving Willingboro as the only high school.

In 1994, the district established a task force on how to combat violence perpetrated by students. This was the second time the district had established such a task force in a two-year period.

In 2002, when the district had 5,500 students, Toni Callas of The Philadelphia Inquirer wrote that the district had "mediocre test scores and a tainted public image." In 2002 it took steps to implement school uniforms and establish three magnet programs in order to attract students to its schools.

In January 2004, the district enacted a mandatory school uniform policy.

The S.W. Bookbinder, J.A. McGinley and Martin Luther King Jr. Elementary Schools were closed at the end of the 2005-06 school year as part of an effort to save about $3.6 million, through the reduction of as many as 100 staff members and class sizes increased as large as 27 at the five remaining elementary schools. The cuts were needed to fill a two-year budget deficit of nearly $10 million.

== Awards and recognition ==
For the 2005-06 school year, Garfield East Elementary School was one of 22 schools statewide selected as Governor's School of Excellence Winners, an award given to schools that have demonstrated significant academic improvement over the previous two academic years.

== Schools ==
Schools in the district (with 2020–21 enrollment data from the National Center for Education Statistics) are:

Early childhood

- Garfield East Early Childhood Development Center with 214 students in grades PreK-K
  - Melissa Cummings, Principal
- J. Cresswell Stuart Early Childhood Development Center with 305 students in grades PreK-K
  - Adrian Cora-Waters, Principal

Elementary schools

- Hawthorne Elementary School with 352 students in grades 1-4
  - Ruhi Ahmed, Principal
- W.R. James Sr. Elementary School with 353 students in grades 1-4
  - Ruhi Ahmed, Principal
- Twin Hills Elementary School with 321 students in grades 1-4
  - Sonya Nock, Principal

Intermediate and middle schools

- James A. Cotten Intermediate School with 558 students in grades 5-6
  - Nicole Hall, Principal
- Willingboro Memorial Middle School with 573 students in grades 7-8
  - Ellis Brown, Principal

High schools

- Willingboro High School with 674 students in grades 9-12
  - Theresa Hipplewith, Principal

== Administration ==
Core members of the district's administration are:

- Malcolm X. Outlaw, Superintendent
- Steven Lewis, Business Administrator & Board Secretary

== Board of Education ==
The district's board of education is composed of nine members who set policy and oversee the fiscal and educational operation of the district through its administration. As a Type II school district, the board's trustees are elected directly by voters to serve three-year terms of office on a staggered basis, with three seats up for election each year held (since 2012) as part of the November general election. The board appoints a superintendent to oversee the district's day-to-day operations and a business administrator to supervise the business functions of the district.
