= Willingboro Township, New Jersey =

Township in Burlington County, New Jersey, US

- Township
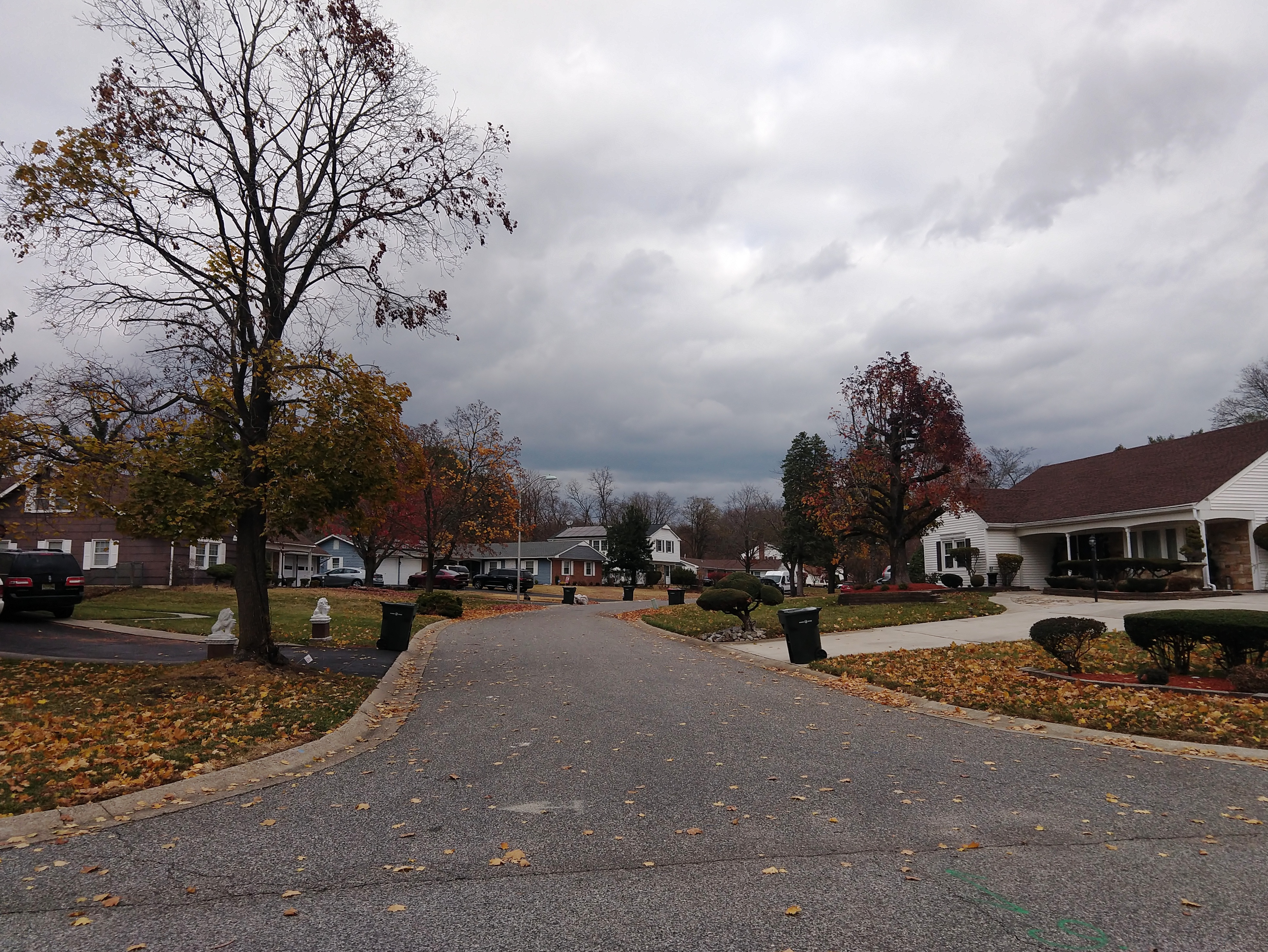
- Tempest Lane, a typical residential street in Willingboro

- Seal
- Motto: "A Naturally Better Place to Be"
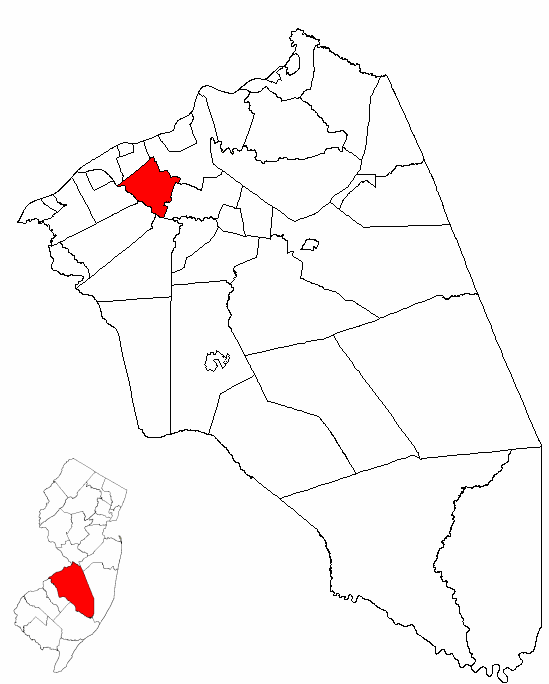
- Location of Willingboro Township in Burlington County highlighted in red (right). Inset map: Location of Burlington County in New Jersey highlighted in red (left).

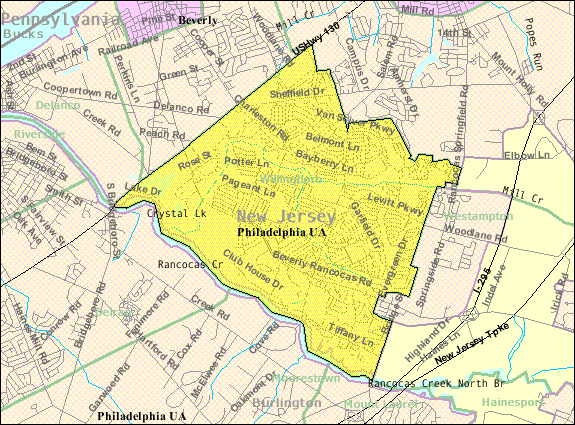
- Census Bureau map of Willingboro Township, New Jersey

- Location in Burlington County Location in New Jersey Location in the United States
- Coordinates: 40.02795°N 74.886984°W
- Country: United States
- State: New Jersey
- County: Burlington
- Formed: November 6, 1688
- Incorporated: February 21, 1798
- Renamed: November 3, 1959 to November 5, 1963 as Levittown Township
- Named for: Wellingborough

Government
  - Type: Faulkner Act (council–manager)
  - Body: Township Council
  - Mayor: Kaya McIntosh (D, term ends December 31, 2027)
  - Manager: Dwayne M. Harris
  - Municipal clerk: Everett Falt, MPA, RMC, CMC

Area
  - Total: 8.14 sq mi (21.08 km^{2})
  - Land: 7.73 sq mi (20.01 km^{2})
  - Water: 0.41 sq mi (1.07 km^{2}) 5.09%
  - Rank: 230th of 565 in state 22nd of 40 in county
- Elevation: 30 ft (9.1 m)

Population (2020)
  - Total: 31,889
  - Estimate (2023): 32,122
  - Rank: 73rd of 565 in state 3rd of 40 in county
  - Density: 4,128/sq mi (1,594/km^{2})
  - Rank: 151st of 565 in state 6th of 40 in county
- Time zone: UTC−05:00 (Eastern (EST))
  - Summer (DST): UTC−04:00 (Eastern (EDT))
- ZIP Code: 08046
- Area codes: 609 and 856
- FIPS code: 3400581440
- GNIS feature ID: 0882099
- Website: https://www.willingboronj.gov/

Willingboro Township (known from 1959 to 1963 as Levittown and Levittown Township) is a township in Burlington County, in the U.S. state of New Jersey. It is a suburb of Philadelphia and part of the state's South Jersey region. The township, and all of Burlington County, is a part of the Philadelphia metropolitan area.

As of the 2020 United States census, the township's population was 31,889, an increase of 260 (+0.8%) from the 2010 census count of 31,629, which in turn reflected a decline of 1,379 (−4.2%) from the 33,008 counted in the 2000 census.

The township has British roots going back to the 17th century. Abraham Levitt and Sons purchased and developed Willingboro land in the 1950s and 1960s as a planned community in their Levittown model.

The 1967 book The Levittowners, by sociologist Herbert J. Gans, was a famous case study in American urban sociology based on the development of Levittown. Willingboro later became a predominantly African American suburb.

== History ==
Lake at Millcreek Park in Willingboro, New Jersey

Willingboro was one of the original nine divisions in the organization of Burlington County within West Jersey, and was originally formed as the "Constabulary of Wellingborrow" on November 6, 1688. At the time, it included present day Delanco Township, New Jersey. The original name of Wellingborough was after the community in England, which was the hometown of Thomas Olive, who led the original settlers into what would become Willingboro Township. Other spellings were used at different times.

After the establishment of the United States and the State of New Jersey, the community was formally incorporated as "Willingborough Township", one of New Jersey's initial group of 104 townships, on February 21, 1798, by the New Jersey Legislature when it enacted "An Act incorporating the Inhabitants of Townships, designating their Powers, and regulating their Meetings", P.L. 1798, p. 289. This makes Willingboro one of the oldest townships in the State. Portions of the township were taken to form Beverly borough (March 5, 1850, now Beverly city) and Beverly Township (March 1, 1859, now known as Delanco Township).

In the 1950s and 1960s, Willingboro was the location for a massive residential development by Levitt & Sons. The town was to be Levitt & Sons' third and largest Levittown development, following similar projects in New York and Pennsylvania. Levitt acquired the great majority of the land in Willingboro; the historic community of Rancocas, in the southeast portion of the township, was annexed to Westampton Township to keep it from being bulldozed, as Levitt wished to keep the development within the boundaries of a single municipality. The first Levittown homes were sold in June 1958, at which time the community was already known as Levittown, New Jersey.

The town's name was changed from the original Willingboro to "Levittown Township" by a referendum of township residents held on November 3, 1959. Willingboro was less than 12 miles (19 km) from Levittown, Pennsylvania and this occasionally caused confusion. The community used the name "Levittown, New Jersey" in 1958, and "Levittown Township" from 1959 to 1963. A referendum held on the issue on November 5, 1963, changed the name back to Willingboro. The name change was passed by a narrow margin of 3,123 to 3,003. In retaliation, Levitt refused to donate any more schools to the fast-growing community. With residential development, the 1950 population of 852 rapidly climbed to 11,861 in 1960; and 43,386 in 1970.

When homes for the new Levittown were first being sold in 1958, Levitt and Sons had a policy against sales to African Americans. W. R. James, an African-American officer in the Army's Criminal Investigation Division, was stationed at nearby Fort Dix and applied to purchase a Levittown home. On June 29, 1958, an agent of Levitt and Sons told him that the new Levittown development would be an all-white community. James filed suit against the company challenging their policy. A friend of his, who worked at the New Jersey Division of Civil Rights, said that it was illegal in New Jersey to discriminate in federally-subsidized housing. At the time, de facto racial segregation in housing existed in many areas in the United States. Levittown was receiving mortgage insurance from the Federal Housing Administration. But as of 1958, the law had not been tested.

James sued Levitt in a case that ultimately went to the New Jersey Supreme Court, which upheld lower court rulings in favor of James. James was not the first African American to move into Willingboro. Given James' success in his suit, Charles and Vera Williams purchased a house and moved into the community in 1960, the first African-American family in Willingboro. James eventually moved into Millbrook Park in 1960. He served as head of the local chapter of the NAACP and eventually became a minister. An elementary school in Willingboro was named in his honor.

Following the court case, Levitt developed a thorough integration program. The company set up an integration committee headed by Howard Lett, an African American. Lett created a five-point program, which included the announcement by community leaders of Levitt's plan to desegregate housing, and a thorough briefing program for Levitt employees, government officials, the police and the press. Lett recommended an attempt to discourage anti-integration activities known as "Operation Hothead". Lett created a Human Relations Council to oversee possible disputes in community. James served as a member of that committee. The committee tried to solve problems of juvenile delinquency in the township. It opposed a curfew passed by the Township Council in the early 1970s. The curfew was later dropped, but reintroduced later.

The African-American population of Willingboro increased throughout the 1960s; by 1964 there were 50 African-American families. By 1970, African Americans represented about 11% of the population. During the early 1970s, several homeowners said they were approached by local real estate agents and told that their neighborhood was becoming increasingly African-American and home values could decline if they did not sell quickly; a practice known as blockbusting. While the Human Relations Council could not prove these claims, it made recommendations to help foster better relations between ethnic communities in the township and calm concerns.

The township in 1974 enacted an ordinance that prohibited the posting of "for sale" or "sold" signs on real estate. Proponents of the ordinance alleged the purpose was to maintain integration. Many other communities had enacted similar laws in reaction to the practice of blockbusting in the 1960s and 1970s. The Supreme Court in the 1977 case of Linmark Associates, Inc. v. Willingboro ruled that the ordinance violated the First Amendment protections for free speech, which applied to commercial needs.

== Geography ==
According to the U.S. Census Bureau, the township had a total area of 8.14 square miles (21.08 km^{2}), including 7.73 square miles (20.01 km^{2}) of land and 0.41 square miles (1.07 km^{2}) of water (5.09%).

The township borders the Burlington County municipalities of Burlington Township, Delanco Township, Delran Township, Edgewater Park Township, Moorestown Township, Mount Laurel Township and Westampton Township. Rancocas Creek drains Willingboro and forms its SW boundary while U.S. Route 130 forms its NW boundary.

Unincorporated communities, localities and place names located partially or completely within the township include Bortons Landing, Charleston and Cooperstown.

=== Parks and sections ===
Willingboro is divided into several sections called parks. Each section's street names begin with the same letter as the corresponding section name. For example, streets in Pennypacker Park all begin with the letter "P". This is the case with all parks, excluding Martin's Beach and certain streets in Rittenhouse Park. Some streets that predate Levittown retained their original names, such as Charleston Road.

Originally, each park or section had its own swimming pool for residents' use. Residents' families would receive free swim tags after showing applicable IDs at each section's school or the community office. However, some swimming pools, such as Hawthorne Park, have been inactive for years. Free lessons and other events were focused on these "park" pools during the summer months. By the 1990s, only Pennypacker Park and Country Club Park had operating summer pools. Finally, Country Club Park and Pennypacker Park have been denoted the "community pools" at this time.

The township's parks include:

- Buckingham Park
- Country Club Ridge, laid out in the 1960s around a golf course designed by Robert Trent Jones.
- Pennypacker Park
- Millbrook Park
- Martin's Beach
- Deer Park
- Somerset Park (First house was occupied here.)
- Windsor Park
- Garfield Park
- Garfield Park East
- Garfield Park North
- Rittenhouse Park
- Twin Hill Park
- Ironside Court (Non-residential, Public Works Department and some industry.)
- Hawthorne Park
- Fairmount Park

A small, unnamed section of the township uses area code 856. The rest of Willingboro is in area code 609.

=== Climate ===
Willingboro has a humid subtropical climate (Cfa) and average monthly temperatures in the vicinity of Veterans Parkway and Willingboro Parkway range from 32.8 °F (0.4 °C) in January to 76.5 °F (24.7 °C) in July. The local hardiness zone is 7a.

== Demographics ==
Historical population
Census	Pop.	Note	%±
1800	495		—
1810	619		25.1%
1820	787		27.1%
1830	782		−0.6%
1840	900		15.1%
1850	1,596		77.3%
1860	643	*	−59.7%
1870	750		16.6%
1880	743		−0.9%
1890	739		−0.5%
1900	673		−8.9%
1910	562		−16.5%
1920	601		6.9%
1930	613		2.0%
1940	642		4.7%
1950	852		32.7%
1960	11,861		1,292.1%
1970	43,386		265.8%
1980	39,912		−8.0%
1990	36,291		−9.1%
2000	33,008		−9.0%
2010	31,629		−4.2%
2020	31,889		0.8%
2023 (est.)	32,122		0.7%
Population sources:1800–2000 1800–1920 1840 1850–1870; 1850 1870 1880–1890; 1890–1910 1910–1930; 1940–2000 2000; 2010 2020 * = Lost territory in previous decade.

=== 2020 census ===
Willingboro township, Burlington County, New Jersey – Racial and ethnic composition Note: the US Census treats Hispanic/Latino as an ethnic category. This table excludes Latinos from the racial categories and assigns them to a separate category. Hispanics/Latinos may be of any race.
Race / Ethnicity (NH = Non-Hispanic)	Pop 2000	Pop 2010	Pop 2020	% 2010	% 2010	% 2020
White alone (NH)	7,560	4,690	3,678	22.90%	14.83%	11.53%
Black or African American alone (NH)	21,616	22,325	21,940	65.49%	70.58%	68.80%
Native American or Alaska Native alone (NH)	87	82	81	0.26%	0.26%	0.25%
Asian alone (NH)	553	618	602	1.68%	1.95%	1.89%
Pacific Islander alone (NH)	12	10	24	0.04%	0.03%	0.08%
Some Other Race alone (NH)	126	121	295	0.38%	0.38%	0.93%
Mixed Race or Multi-Racial (NH)	1,056	1,046	1,504	3.20%	3.31%	4.72%
Hispanic or Latino (any race)	1,998	2,737	3,765	6.05%	8.65%	11.81%
Total	33,008	31,629	31,889	100.00%	100.00%	100.00%

=== 2010 census ===
The 2010 United States census counted 31,629 people, 10,884 households, and 8,283 families in the township. The population density was 4,087.3 per square mile (1,578.1/km^{2}). There were 11,442 housing units at an average density of 1,478.6 per square mile (570.9/km^{2}). The racial makeup was 17.31% (5,475) White, 72.74% (23,007) Black or African American, 0.37% (117) Native American, 2.01% (635) Asian, 0.03% (10) Pacific Islander, 3.12% (988) from other races, and 4.42% (1,397) from two or more races. Hispanic or Latino of any race were 8.65% (2,737) of the population.

Of the 10,884 households, 27.3% had children under the age of 18; 49.3% were married couples living together; 21.4% had a female householder with no husband present and 23.9% were non-families. Of all households, 20.1% were made up of individuals and 9.2% had someone living alone who was 65 years of age or older. The average household size was 2.90 and the average family size was 3.32.

23.5% of the population were under the age of 18, 9.0% from 18 to 24, 22.8% from 25 to 44, 28.7% from 45 to 64, and 15.9% who were 65 years of age or older. The median age was 41.0 years. For every 100 females, the population had 85.5 males. For every 100 females ages 18 and older there were 81.2 males.

The Census Bureau's 2006–2010 American Community Survey showed that (in 2010 inflation-adjusted dollars) median household income was $66,479 (with a margin of error of +/− $4,323) and the median family income was $73,968 (+/− $2,888). Males had a median income of $48,323 (+/− $2,553) versus $40,313 (+/− $3,074) for females. The per capita income for the township was $25,989 (+/− $1,048). About 6.9% of families and 8.6% of the population were below the poverty line, including 14.5% of those under age 18 and 3.8% of those age 65 or over.

== Arts and culture ==
The rap/R&B group City High was established in the township.

== Government ==
=== Local government ===
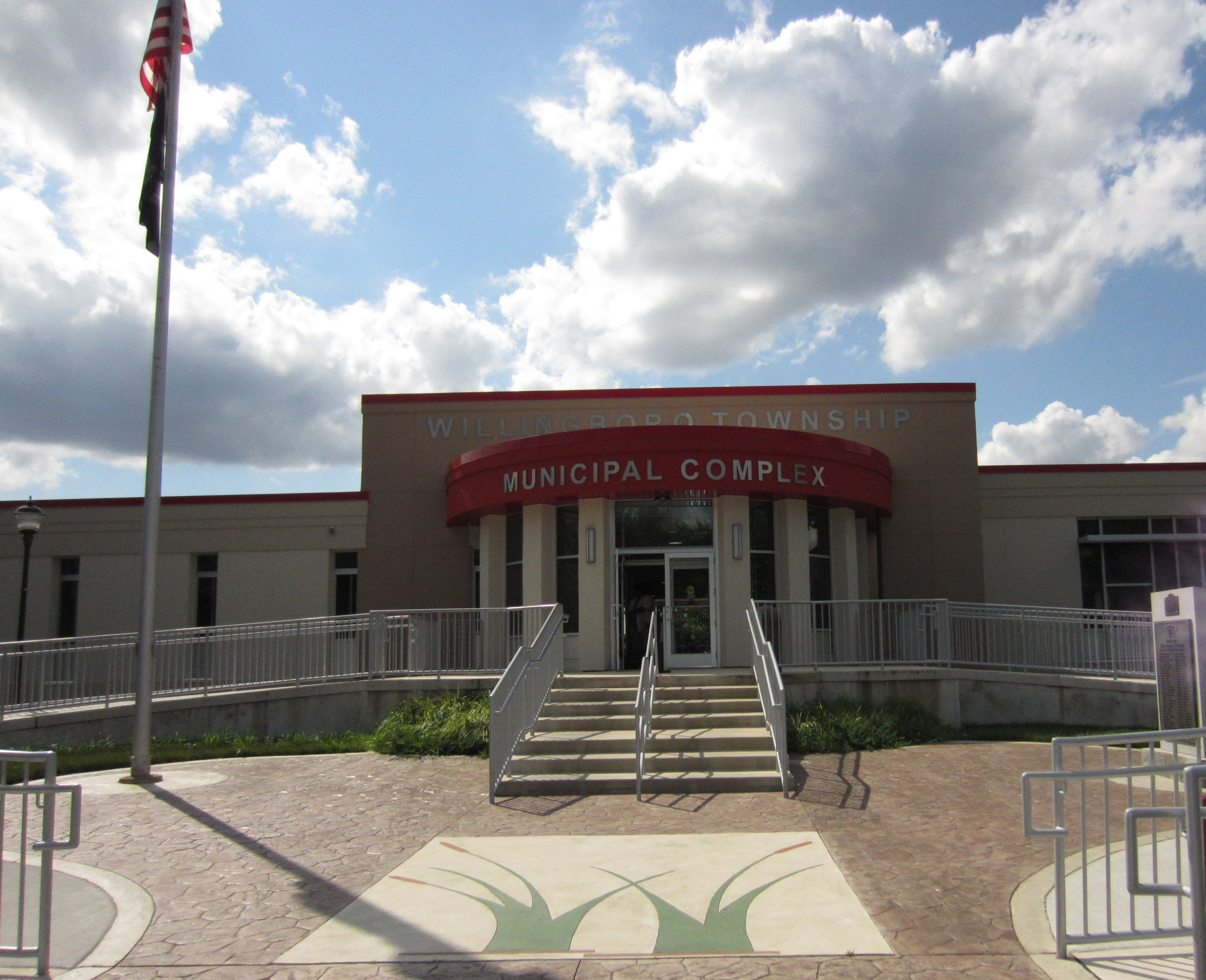
Willingboro Municipal Complex

Willingboro Township is governed within the Faulkner Act, formally known as the Optional Municipal Charter Law, under the Council-Manager form of government (Plan E), enacted by direct petition and implemented as of January 1, 1962. The township is one of 42 municipalities (of the 564) statewide that use this form of government. The current Council-Manager form of government was adopted by referendum in November 1960 based on the recommendations of a Charter Study Commission. The elections for the first council to operate under the new Council-Manager form of government took place in November 1961, with the new council taking office as of January 1, 1962, under the new form. The Township Council is comprised of five members, who are elected in partisan elections to serve four-year terms in office on a staggered basis, with two or three seats coming up for election as part of the November general election during odd-numbered years. At a reorganization held during the first week of January after each election, the council selects a Mayor and Deputy Mayor from among its members.

As of 2024, the members of the Willingboro Township Council are Mayor Kaya T. McIntosh (D, term on council ends December 31, 2027; term as mayor ends 2025), Deputy Mayor Nathaniel Anderson (D, term on council and as deputy mayor ends 2025), Rebecca Perrone (D, 2025), Samantha E. Whitfield (D, 2027) and Tiffani A. Worthy (D, 2027).

In July 2017, the council selected Rebecca Perone from a list of three candidates nominated by the Democratic municipal committee to fill the seat that had been held by Christopher "Chris" Walker expiring in December 2019 until he resigned from his post as mayor in June 2017.

The township council appointed Chris Walker in October 2013 to fill the vacant seat of Ken Gordon, after a New Jersey Superior Court judge ruled that Gordon's seat was vacant based on his having missed a series of council meetings. Eddie Campbell was named to fill Gordon's former position as deputy mayor. Darvis Holley was appointed in April 2014 to fill the vacant seat of Jim Ayrer, who had resigned after serving on the council for 34 years.

=== Federal, state, and county representation ===
Willingboro Township is located in the 3rd Congressional District and is part of New Jersey's 7th state legislative district.

For the 119th United States Congress, New Jersey's 3rd congressional district is currently represented Herb Conaway (D, Delran Township). New Jersey is represented in the United States Senate by Democrats Cory Booker (Newark, term ends 2027) and Andy Kim (Moorestown, term ends 2031).

For the 2026–2027 session, the 7th legislative district of the New Jersey Legislature is represented in the State Senate by Troy Singleton (D, Palmyra) and in the General Assembly by Carol A. Murphy (D, Mount Laurel) and Balvir Singh (D, Burlington Township).

Burlington County is governed by a Board of County Commissioners comprised of five members who are chosen at-large in partisan elections to serve three-year terms of office on a staggered basis, with either one or two seats coming up for election each year; at an annual reorganization meeting, the board selects a director and deputy director from among its members to serve a one-year term. As of 2026, Burlington County's Commissioners are: Director Felicia Hopson (D, Willingboro Township, term as commissioner ends December 31, 2027; term as director ends 2026), Deputy Director Allison Eckel (D, Medford, term as commissioner ends 2028; term as deputy director ends 2026), Randy Brolo (D, Lumberton, 2026; elected to an unexpired term), Tyler Burrell (D, Delran Township, 2027) and Tom Pullion (D, Edgewater Park, 2026).

Burlington County's constitutional officers are Clerk Joanne Schwartz (D, Southampton Township, 2028), Sheriff James H. Kostoplis (D, Bordentown, 2028) and Surrogate Brian J. Carlin (D, Burlington Township, 2026).

=== Politics ===
United States presidential election results for Willingboro Township 2024 2020 2016 2012 2008 2004
Year	Republican		Democratic		Third party(ies)	
Year	No.	%	No.	%	No.	%
2024	1,761	11.28%	13,678	87.60%	176	1.13%
2020	1,537	8.73%	15,960	90.69%	102	0.58%
2016	1,276	8.17%	14,033	89.82%	314	2.01%
2012	1,300	7.65%	15,635	91.98%	63	0.37%
2008	1,616	9.08%	16,104	90.50%	75	0.42%
2004	2,701	17.99%	12,226	81.44%	85	0.57%

As of March 2011, there were a total of 20,713 registered voters in Willingboro Township, of which 12,117 (58.5% vs. 33.3% countywide) were registered as Democrats, 1,268 (6.1% vs. 23.9%) were registered as Republicans and 7,322 (35.3% vs. 42.8%) were registered as Unaffiliated. There were 6 voters registered as Libertarians or Greens. Among the township's 2010 Census population, 65.5% (vs. 61.7% in Burlington County) were registered to vote, including 85.7% of those ages 18 and over (vs. 80.3% countywide).

In the 2012 presidential election, Democrat Barack Obama received 15,635 votes here (91.4% vs. 58.1% countywide), ahead of Republican Mitt Romney with 1,300 votes (7.6% vs. 40.2%) and other candidates with 63 votes (0.4% vs. 1.0%), among the 17,101 ballots cast by the township's 22,031 registered voters, for a turnout of 77.6% (vs. 74.5% in Burlington County). In the 2008 presidential election, Democrat Barack Obama received 16,104 votes here (90.0% vs. 58.4% countywide), ahead of Republican John McCain with 1,616 votes (9.0% vs. 39.9%) and other candidates with 75 votes (0.4% vs. 1.0%), among the 17,899 ballots cast by the township's 21,755 registered voters, for a turnout of 82.3% (vs. 80.0% in Burlington County). In the 2004 presidential election, Democrat John Kerry received 12,226 votes here (81.1% vs. 52.9% countywide), ahead of Republican George W. Bush with 2,701 votes (17.9% vs. 46.0%) and other candidates with 85 votes (0.6% vs. 0.8%), among the 15,067 ballots cast by the township's 20,197 registered voters, for a turnout of 74.6% (vs. 78.8% in the whole county).

Gubernatorial election results for Willingboro Township
Year	Republican		Democratic		Third party(ies)	
Year	No.	%	No.	%	No.	%
2025	985	8.19%	10,980	91.28%	64	0.53%
2021	913	10.03%	8,129	89.30%	61	0.67%
2017	786	8.91%	7,948	90.06%	91	1.03%
2013	2,453	27.24%	6,513	72.32%	40	0.44%
2009	1,296	13.27%	8,235	84.34%	233	2.39%
2005	1,274	14.51%	7,273	82.84%	233	2.65%

In the 2013 gubernatorial election, Democrat Barbara Buono received 6,513 ballots cast (70.6% vs. 35.8% countywide), ahead of Republican Chris Christie with 2,453 votes (26.6% vs. 61.4%) and other candidates with 40 votes (0.4% vs. 1.2%), among the 9,227 ballots cast by the township's 21,474 registered voters, yielding a 43.0% turnout (vs. 44.5% in the county). In the 2009 gubernatorial election, Democrat Jon Corzine received 8,235 ballots cast (83.7% vs. 44.5% countywide), ahead of Republican Chris Christie with 1,296 votes (13.2% vs. 47.7%), Independent Chris Daggett with 169 votes (1.7% vs. 4.8%) and other candidates with 64 votes (0.7% vs. 1.2%), among the 9,837 ballots cast by the township's 21,588 registered voters, yielding a 45.6% turnout (vs. 44.9% in the county).

United States Senate election results for Willingboro Township1
Year	Republican		Democratic		Third party(ies)	
Year	No.	%	No.	%	No.	%
2024	1,306	8.79%	13,187	88.75%	365	2.46%
2018	1,231	9.08%	11,424	84.23%	908	6.69%
2012	1,223	7.51%	15,006	92.17%	52	0.32%
2006	1,424	16.19%	7,239	82.28%	135	1.53%

United States Senate election results for Willingboro Township2
Year	Republican		Democratic		Third party(ies)	
Year	No.	%	No.	%	No.	%
2020	1,380	7.95%	15,831	91.20%	148	0.85%
2014	820	8.45%	8,822	90.88%	65	0.67%
2013	548	7.54%	6,670	91.75%	52	0.72%
2008	1,532	9.52%	14,316	88.99%	239	1.49%

== Education ==
Willingboro Township Public Schools serves students in pre-kindergarten through twelfth grade. As of the 2020–21 school year, the district, comprised of nine schools, had an enrollment of 3,456 students and 277.0 classroom teachers (on an FTE basis), for a student–teacher ratio of 12.5:1. Schools in the district (with 2020–21 enrollment data from the National Center for Education Statistics) are Garfield East Early Childhood Development Center with 214 students in grades Pre-K–K, J. Cresswell Stuart Early Childhood Development Center with 305 students in grades Pre-K–K, Hawthorne Elementary School with 352 students in grades 1–4, W.R. James Sr. Elementary School with 353 students in grades 1–4, Twin Hills Elementary School with 321 students in grades 1–4, Levitt Intermediate School with 558 students in grades 5–6, Willingboro Memorial Middle School with 573 students in grades 7–8, and Willingboro High School with 674 students in grades 9–12.

During the early development of the township, all high school students attended Levittown High School for grades 9–12 (LHS was renamed "Levitt Jr. High School" when the new high school—John F. Kennedy—was opened in 1964). It was the only junior high school, grades 7 through 9, until Memorial Junior High School opened in 1968. The substantial student population at JFK HS required that the school go to split sessions and only was able to house grades 10–12, with the freshmen classes divided between Memorial and Levitt junior high schools. In 1975, Willingboro HS was opened and became the "sister" school, located only about two miles apart—both on JFK Way. Over time student enrollment fell and both middle schools would eventually close. The district shifted the make-up of the school and elementary schools held grades K-7 while the two high schools held grades 8-12. This is the way the township was until JFK HS became a middle school in 1990, leaving Willingboro as the only high school. By this time, the township population fell and Levitt Junior High School was closed to become township offices and storage. Memorial Junior High School would remain open for college classes for Burlington County College. Kennedy Middle School eventually closed and became Kennedy Center, a community center for the performing arts, an additional gym for events, and classrooms for college classes.

The S.W. Bookbinder, J.A. McGinley and Martin Luther King Jr. Elementary Schools were closed at the end of the 2005–06 school year as part of an effort to save about $3.6 million, through the reduction of as many as 100 staff members and class sizes increased as large as 27 at the five remaining elementary schools. The cuts were needed to fill a two-year budget deficit of nearly $10 million.

Students from Willingboro Township, and from all of Burlington County, are eligible to attend the Burlington County Institute of Technology, a countywide public school district that serves the vocational and technical education needs of students at the high school and post-secondary level at its campuses in Medford and Westampton.

The Willingboro Public Library is the municipal public library for the township. It first opened in 1960 and operates independently from the Burlington County Library System. Before 2003, the library was housed in the township's municipal building on Salem Road. The current library building is 42,000 square feet (3,900 m^{2}). and is an anchor for the new Willingboro Town Center on U.S. Route 130.

== Transportation ==
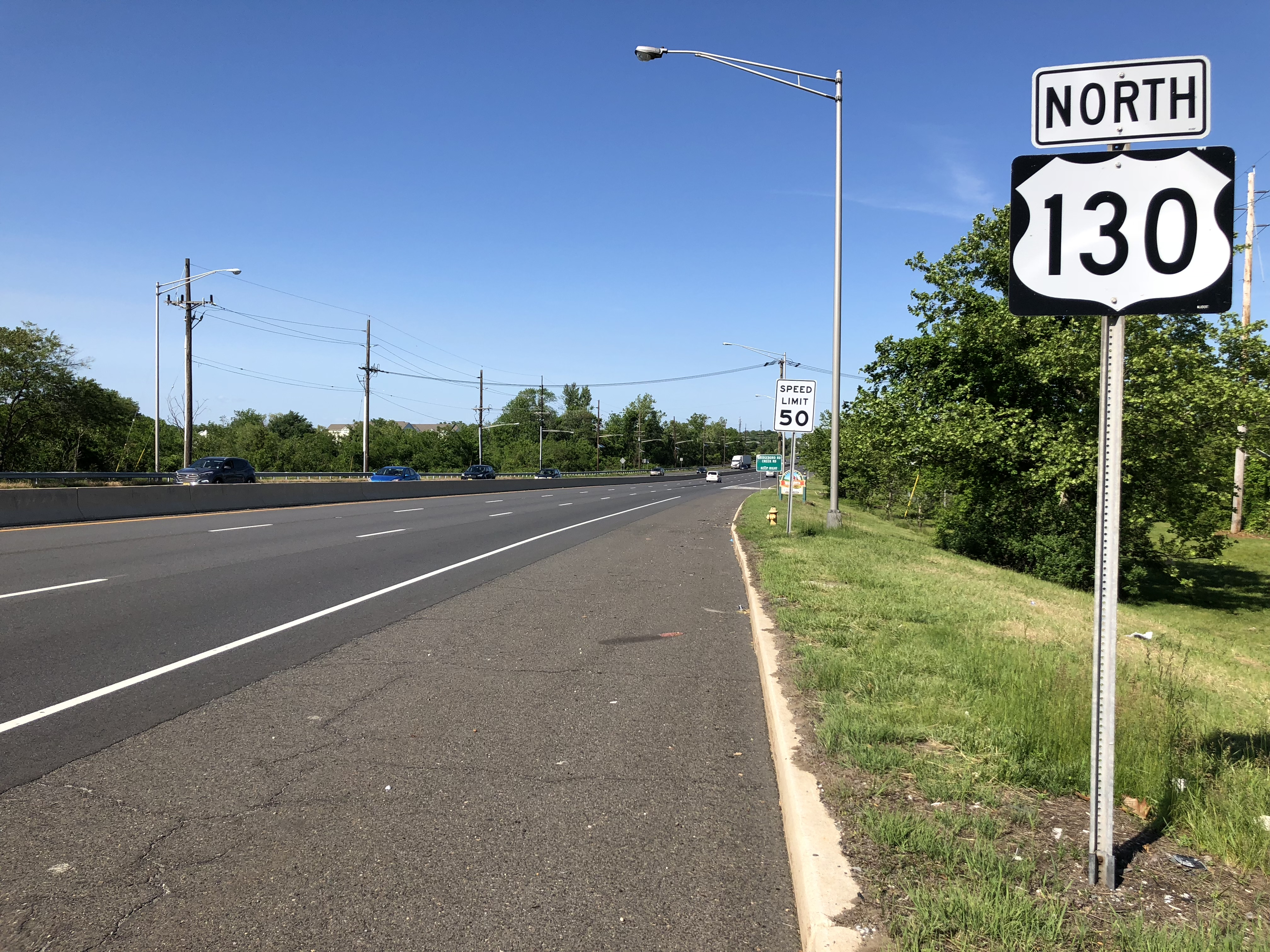
U.S. Route 130 on the northwest edge of Willingboro

=== Roads and highways ===
As of May 2010, the township had a total of 122.11 miles (196.52 km) of roadways, of which 109.02 miles (175.45 km) were maintained by the municipality, 11.53 miles (18.56 km) by Burlington County and 1.56 miles (2.51 km) by the New Jersey Department of Transportation.

U.S. Route 130 is the main highway serving Willingboro. It straddles the township's borders with Delanco Township and Edgewater Park Township.

=== Public transportation ===
NJ Transit provides bus service on 409 / 417 / 418 routes between Trenton and Philadelphia.

BurLink bus service is offered on the B1 route (between Beverly and Pemberton) and on the B2 route (between Beverly and Westampton).

Academy Bus provides service from Willingboro and at the park-and-ride facility near Exit 5 of the New Jersey Turnpike in Westampton to the Port Authority Bus Terminal and other street service in Midtown Manhattan and to both Jersey City and the Wall Street area in Lower Manhattan.

== Notable people ==
People who were born in, residents of, or otherwise closely associated with Willingboro Township include:

- Mark Adamo (born 1962), composer and librettist with New York City Opera
- Malik Allen (born 1978), NBA power forward for the Minnesota Timberwolves
- Priscilla B. Anderson (born 1935), politician who served in the New Jersey General Assembly from the 7th Legislative District from 1992 to 1994 and as mayor of Willingboro
- Tony Bellinger (born 1957), retired professional soccer defender who played in the NASL for the Dallas Tornado
- T. J. Brennan (born 1989), professional ice hockey defenseman who has played in the NHL for the Buffalo Sabres, Florida Panthers and Toronto Maple Leafs
- Chiquita Brooks-LaSure, healthcare policy official who served as the administrator for the Centers for Medicare and Medicaid Services from 2021 to 2025
- Cardiak (born 1988), music producer for 50 Cent, Rick Ross, Fabolous, Meek Mill and Lloyd Banks
- Eli Carter (born 1991), professional basketball player who played for ASE Essaouira of the Nationale 1
- Sean Casey (born 1974), Major League Baseball first baseman for the Boston Red Sox
- Fannie Lee Chaney (1921–2007), baker who became a civil rights activist following the murder of her son James Chaney in Mississippi in 1964 by the Ku Klux Klan
- Mike Chioda (born 1964), WWE professional wrestling Referee and Raw Senior Referee
- Ant Clemons (born 1991), singer-songwriter, who released his debut album Happy 2 Be Here in March 2020
- Lady Bird Cleveland (1926–2015), painter whose work primarily depicts the African-American experience
- Catherine A. Costa (1926–2025), politician who represented New Jersey's 7th legislative district in the New Jersey General Assembly from 1982 to 1984 and in the New Jersey Senate from 1984 to 1990
- Tom Davis (born c. 1970), basketball player best known for his college career at Delaware State University between 1987–88 and 1990–91 in which he had more than 2,200 points and 1,000 rebounds
- Gary Dourdan (born 1966), actor best known for playing the character Warrick Brown on the television series CSI: Crime Scene Investigation
- Chuck Faucette (born 1963), former NFL linebacker who played for the San Diego Chargers for two seasons
- William Franklin (1731–1813), last Colonial Governor of New Jersey, son of Benjamin Franklin
- Vance Gilbert, folk music singer/songwriter
- James Green (born 1992), amateur wrestler who won bronze at the 2015 World Wrestling Championships at Men's freestyle 70 kg
- Anthony Griggs (born 1960), former NFL linebacker who played for the Philadelphia Eagles and Cleveland Browns
- Erskine Hawkins (1914–1993), jazz trumpeter and big band leader
- Nola Henry (born 1994), professional basketball coach who is an assistant coach for the Dallas Wings of the WNBA
- Derrick Hodge (born 1979), bassist, composer, music producer, music director and recording artist
- Charles W. Hooper, Lieutenant General in the United States Army who has held the position of Director of the Defense Security Cooperation Agency since 2017
- Barbara Kalik (born 1936), politician who served in the New Jersey General Assembly from the 7th Legislative District from 1978 to 1992 and as mayor of Willingboro
- Stephen Kasprzyk (born 1982), rower who represented the United States in the Men's eight event at the 2012 Summer Olympics in London
- Michelle Kosinski (born 1974), journalist who has been a White House correspondent for CNN
- Crystal Langhorne (born 1986), WNBA basketball player drafted in 2008 by the Washington Mystics Won the National Championship in 2006 as a member of the Maryland Terrapins

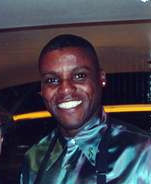
Carl Lewis

- Carl Lewis (born 1961), United States Olympic track athlete who won ten Olympic medals (9 gold, 1 silver) and was ranked #1 on the Sports Illustrated list of The 50 Greatest New Jersey Sports Figures
- Cleve Lewis (born 1955), retired professional soccer player who was the first African American drafted by the North American Soccer League
- Wali Lundy (born 1983), rapper and former football running back who played in the NFL for the Houston Texans
- Joey Marella (1963–1994), WWE professional wrestling referee, who refereed main event for the indoor attendance record setting match at WrestleMania III between André the Giant versus Hulk Hogan in the Pontiac Silverdome
- Marilyn Marshall (1941–2015), R&B singer/musician
- Tim Marshall, R&B Music Hall of Fame radio host, journalist, educator and humanitarian
- Patrick McFarland (born 1951), former professional basketball player who played in the American Basketball Association for the Denver Rockets, Denver Nuggets, and San Diego Sails
- Kareem McKenzie (born 1979), National Football League offensive tackle
- David Miscavige (born 1960), leader of the Church of Scientology
- Shalèt Monique, actress, writer and producer, who appeared in Straw and We Own This City
- Gorilla Monsoon (1937–1999), WWE Hall of Fame professional wrestler who is a former president of WWE
- Dezman Moses (born 1989), National Football League linebacker with the Green Bay Packers
- Kristopher Negron (born 1986), professional baseball utility player who has played for the Cincinnati Reds
- Thomas Olive, deputy-governor of West Jersey from 1684 to 1685, who gave the township its name, based on his birthplace of Wellingborough
- Claudette Ortiz (born 1981), singer and model

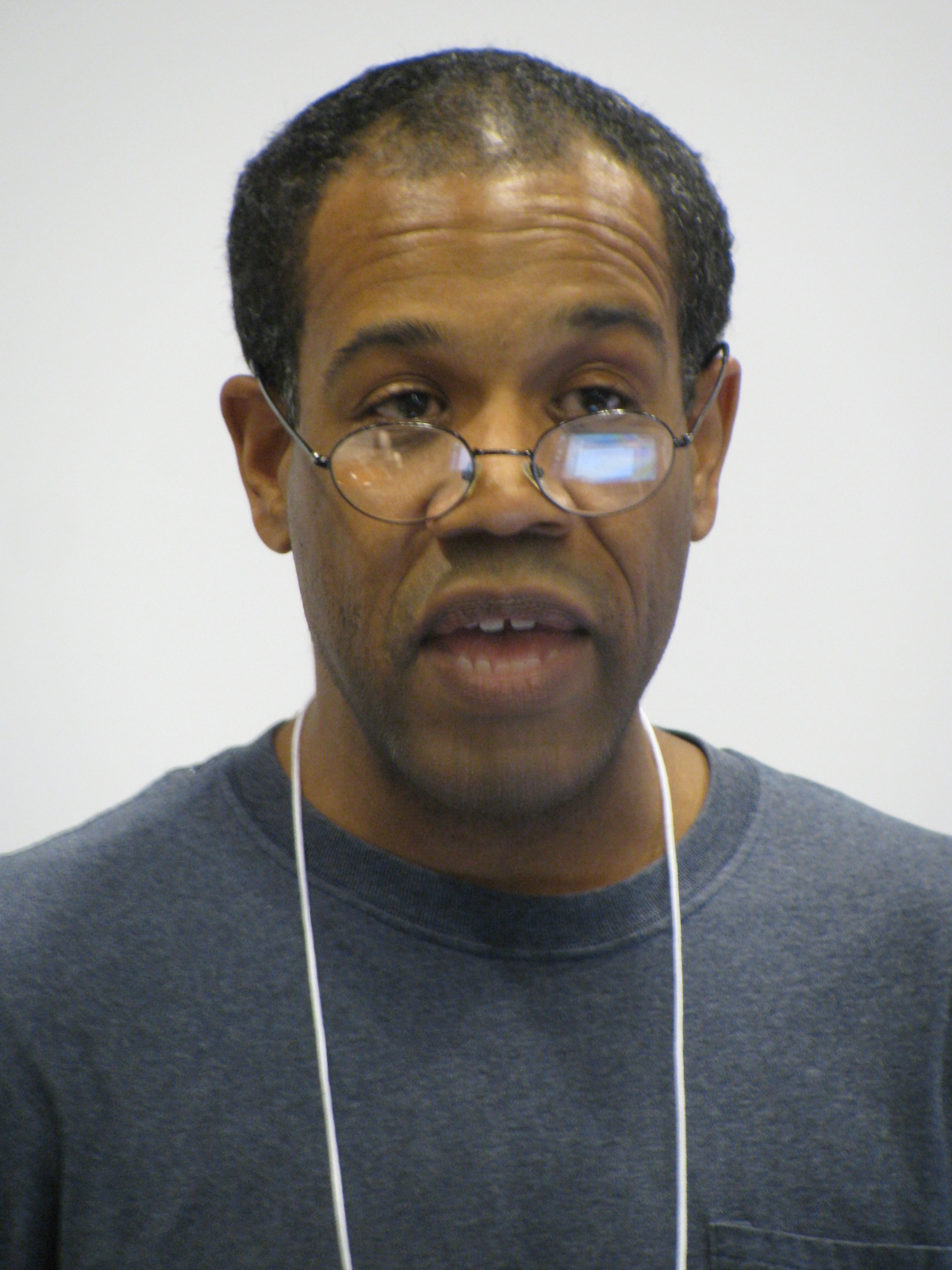
Gregory Pardlo

- Gregory Pardlo (born 1968), poet
- Gervase Peterson (born 1969), contestant on Survivor: Borneo, the first season of the program
- Shaun Phillips (born 1981), National Football League defensive tackle
- Maria Rodriguez-Gregg (born 1981), member of the New Jersey General Assembly from 2014 to 2018, who was the first Republican Hispanic woman to be elected to the New Jersey Legislature
- Keith Saunders (born 1984), professional football linebacker who has played for the Winnipeg Blue Bombers of the Canadian Football League
- Craig Schurig (born 1965), football coach and former player who has been the head coach for the Washburn Ichabods football team since the 2002 season
- Troy Singleton (born 1973), member of the New Jersey Senate from the 7th Legislative District since 2018
- LaMont Smith (born 1972), gold medalist at the 1996 Olympic Games in the men's 4x400 meter relay
- Mark Tatulli (born 1963), syndicated comic strip cartoonist and children's book author
- Ryan Toby (born 1976), soul singer, songwriter, producer, and actor best known for playing Wesley Glen Ahmal James in the 1993 film Sister Act 2: Back in the Habit
- Jimmy Valiant (born 1942), WWE Hall of Fame professional wrestler
- Peter Vermes (born 1966), former professional soccer player who has been the head coach of Sporting Kansas City in Major League Soccer
- Mark Zagunis (born 1993), professional baseball player
- Mike Zombie (born 1992 as William Michael Coleman), record producer and rapper

== See also ==
- List of sundown towns in the United States
