= Kiyan Anthony =

American basketball player (born 2007)

No. 7 – Syracuse Orange
- Position: Shooting guard
- Conference: Atlantic Coast Conference

Personal information
- Born: March 7, 2007 (age 19) Denver, Colorado, U.S.
- Listed height: 6 ft 5 in (1.96 m)
- Listed weight: 185 lb (84 kg)

Career information
- High school: Long Island Lutheran (Brookville, New York); Christ the King Regional (Queens, New York)
- College: Syracuse (2025–present)

Career highlights
- Jordan Brand Classic MVP (2025); Mr. New York Basketball (2025)

Kiyan Carmelo Anthony (born March 7, 2007) is an American basketball player for the Syracuse Orange of the Atlantic Coast Conference. He is the child of former National Basketball Association (NBA) player Carmelo Anthony and television personality La La Anthony. Anthony primarily plays the shooting guard position.

== Early life ==
Anthony was born on March 7, 2007, to Carmelo Anthony and his wife Alani "La La" Vazquez. His father is a former NBA player who played for several teams, including the Denver Nuggets, the New York Knicks, and the Los Angeles Lakers. His mother is an actress and producer who has appeared in various films and television shows, The Chi, Power, Think Like a Man, and La La’s Full Court Life.

== High school career ==
Anthony was a senior basketball player at Long Island Lutheran High School in New York, to which he transferred from Christ the King High School in Queens in 2023. He played as a shooting guard and a forward.

He was a standout performer for his high school team and his AAU team, Team Melo, which is sponsored by his father. He is ranked as one of the top shooting guards in the class of 2025 by ESPN and other recruiting services.

In 2023, he signed a name, image and likeness (NIL) deal with PSD.

=== Recruiting ===
Anthony received many offers from Division I college basketball programs, including Indiana, Michigan, Florida State, Illinois, Pittsburgh, Seton Hall, Memphis, and Tennessee. He was also interested in Syracuse, where his father won a national championship in 2003. He visited the university on an official recruiting visit in October 2023, where he posed in a Syracuse jersey with his father and met with head coach Adrian Autry. On November 15, 2024, Kiyan announced he would be committing to Syracuse for his collegiate basketball career.

== College career ==
Anthony enrolled at Syracuse for the 2025–26 academic year. On November 2, 2025, in his debut with the Orange, Anthony tallied 15 points, 3 rebounds, and 3 assists in a 85-47 blowout win against the Binghamton Bearcats. He started his first game with Syracuse against Delaware State, contributing 19 points, 4 rebounds and 3 assists.
