= Delaware State Hornets men's basketball statistical leaders =

The Delaware State Hornets men's basketball statistical leaders are individual statistical leaders of the Delaware State Hornets men's basketball program in various categories, including points, rebounds, assists, steals, and blocks. Within those areas, the lists identify single-game, single-season, and career leaders. The Hornets represent Delaware State University in the NCAA's Mid-Eastern Athletic Conference.

Delaware State began competing in intercollegiate basketball in 1956. The NCAA did not officially record assists as a stat until the 1983–84 season, and blocks and steals until the 1985–86 season, but Delaware State's record books includes players in these stats before these seasons. These lists are updated through the end of the 2020–21 season.

== Scoring ==
Career
Rk	Player	Points	Seasons
1	Tom Davis	2275	1987–88 1988–89 1989–90 1990–91
2	Dave Withers	1795	1967–68 1968–69 1969–70 1970–71
3	Jahsha Bluntt	1721	2003–04 2004–05 2005–06 2006–07
4	Charles Shealy	1618	1976–77 1977–78 1978–79 1979–80
5	Martaz Robinson	1537	2020–21 2021–22 2022–23 2023–24 2024–25
6	Terence Hood	1501	1995–96 1996–97 1997–98 1998–99
7	Paul Newman	1485	1987–88 1988–89 1989–90 1990–91
8	Casey Walker	1449	2010–11 2011–12 2012–13 2013–14
9	Andre Matthews	1427	1999–00 2000–01 2001–02 2002–03
10	Emanual Davis	1269	1988–89 1989–90 1990–91

Season
Rk	Player	Points	Season
1	Tom Davis	740	1990–91
2	Tom Davis	706	1988–89
3	Amere May	671	2014–15
4	Tom Davis	665	1989–90
5	John Crosby	630	2019–20
6	Dave Withers	564	1969–70
7	Martaz Robinson	542	2023–24
8	Robert Smith	541	2024–25
9	Roy Bright	535	2007–08
10	Ronald Horton	528	1967–68

Single game
Rk	Player	Points	Season	Opponent
1	Tom Davis	50	1988–89	Brooklyn
2	Amere May	48	2014–15	St. Francis Brooklyn
3	Tom Davis	47	1988–89	Florida A&M
4	Tom Davis	44	1989–90	UMES
5	Kevin Larkin	40	2018–19	Cairn University
6	Ronald Horton	39	1967–68	Norfolk State
7	Ronald Horton	38	1965–66	Norfolk State
	Tom Davis	38	1987–88	So. Carolina State
	William Hill	38	1979–80	Howard

== Rebounds ==
Career
Rk	Player	Rebounds	Seasons
1	Dave Withers	1211	1967–68 1968–69 1969–70 1970–71
2	Tom Davis	1013	1987–88 1988–89 1989–90 1990–91
3	Marvin Spratley	931	1969–70 1970–71 1971–72
4	James Roundtree	842	1971–72 1972–73 1973–74 1974–75
5	Kendall Gray	821	2011–12 2012–13 2013–14 2014–15
6	James Rogers	811	1972–73 1973–74 1974–75 1975–76
7	Fred Simmons	769	1972–73 1973–74 1974–75 1975–76

Season
Rk	Player	Rebounds	Season
1	Ronald Horton	543	1967–68
2	Kendall Gray	401	2014–15
	Marvin Spratley	401	1971–72
4	Dave Withers	400	1970–71
5	Tom Davis	366	1990–91

Single game
Rk	Player	Rebounds	Season	Opponent
1	Marvin Spratley	35	1970–71	St. Paul's
2	Kendall Gray	30	2014–15	Coppin State

== Assists ==
Career
Rk	Player	Assists	Seasons
1	Jay Threatt	458	2009–10 2010–11 2011–12
2	Darrin Shine	420	2004–05 2005–06 2006–07
3	Johquin Wiley	400	2017–18 2018–19 2019–20 2020–21
4	Miles Davis	390	2000–01 2001–02 2002–03 2003–04
5	Emanual Davis	378	1988–89 1989–90 1990–91

Season
Rk	Player	Assists	Season
1	Jay Threatt	179	2010–11
2	Jay Threatt	156	2011–12
	Emanual Davis	156	1989–90
	Darrin Shine	156	2005–06
	Darrin Shine	156	2006–07
6	Antoine Morris	154	1995–96
7	Emanual Davis	139	1990–91

Single game
Rk	Player	Assists	Season	Opponent
1	Antoine Morris	13	1995–96	Morgan State
	Antoine Morris	13	1995–96	Bowie State
3	Trevor Welcher	12	2007–08	St. Paul's
4	Jay Threatt	11	2010–11	N.C. State
	Miles Davis	11	2001–02	Fairleigh Dickinson
	Miles Davis	11	2000–01	Towson

== Steals ==
Career
Rk	Player	Steals	Seasons
1	Jay Threatt	253	2009–10 2010–11 2011–12
2	Martaz Robinson	188	2020–21 2021–22 2022–23 2023–24 2024–25
3	Johquin Wiley	185	2017–18 2018–19 2019–20 2020–21
4	Emanual Davis	183	1988–89 1989–90 1990–91
5	Anthony Baylor	170	1978–79 1979–80
6	Joe Jeter	143	1984–85 1985–86 1986–87

Season
Rk	Player	Steals	Season
1	Anthony Baylor	97	1979–80
2	Joe Jeter	96	1986–87
3	Jay Threatt	93	2010–11
4	Jay Threatt	82	2009–10
5	Jay Threatt	78	2011–12
6	Anthony Baylor	73	1978–79

Single game
Rk	Player	Steals	Season	Opponent
1	Phil Anderson	9	1993–94	Penn State
	Jay Threatt	9	2009–10	Wilmington

== Blocks ==
Career
Rk	Player	Blocks	Seasons
1	Kendall Gray	305	2011–12 2012–13 2013–14 2014–15
2	Marques Oliver	222	2009–10 2010–11 2011–12 2012–13
3	Tracey Walston	143	1986–87 1987–88 1988–89 1989–90
4	Aaron Fleetwood	140	2003–04 2004–05 2005–06 2006–07
5	Hijr Sabree	102	1990–91 1991–92 1992–93 1993–94

Season
Rk	Player	Blocks	Season
1	Kendall Gray	95	2014–15
2	Kendall Gray	81	2013–14
3	Kendall Gray	75	2012–13
4	Marques Oliver	72	2011–12
5	Tracey Walston	67	1989–90
6	Marques Oliver	63	2010–11
7	Marques Oliver	61	2012–13

Single game
Rk	Player	Blocks	Season	Opponent
1	Aaron Fleetwood	8	2004–05	Northwestern
	Marques Oliver	8	2011–12	Howard
	Marques Oliver	8	2011–12	Florida A&M
	Kendall Gray	8	2012–13	Wagner
	Marques Oliver	8	2012–13	Hampton
	Kendall Gray	8	2013–14	NC A&T
	Kendall Gray	8	2014–15	Wake Forest
	Kendall Gray	8	2014–15	UMES
