= La La's Full Court Wedding =

- Genre: Documentary
- Created by: Cris Abrego; La La Anthony; Steven Grossman
- Starring: La La Anthony; Carmelo Anthony
- Country of origin: United States
- No. of seasons: 1
- No. of episodes: 6

Production
- Executive producers: Cris Abrego; La La Anthony; Carmelo Anthony; Steven Grossman; Ben Samek; Rabih Gholam; Jill Holmes; Kristen Kelly; Jeff Olde
- Running time: 20 to 22 minutes (excluding commercials)
- Production companies: 51 Minds Entertainment; Krossover Entertainment

Original release
- Network: VH1
- Release: September 19 – October 24, 2010

Related
- La La's Full Court Life

La La's Full Court Wedding is an American reality documentary television series on VH1. The series debuted on September 19, 2010.

A spin-off of the series, La La's Full Court Life, it follows the couple's married life.

== Premise ==
The series documents former MTV correspondent and television personality La La Vasquez and NBA star Carmelo Anthony as they prepare for their wedding.

== Episodes ==
No.	Title	Original release date
1	"It's Finally Here!"	September 19, 2010
2	"Birthday and the City"	September 26, 2010
3	"Bachelorette Party"	October 3, 2010
4	"Last Minute Details"	October 10, 2010
5	"The Big Day"	October 17, 2010
6	"Clip Show"	October 24, 2010
