= The Love Playbook =

2014 relationship advice book

The Love Playbook: Rules for Love, Sex, and Happiness is a relationship advice book published in 2014. It was written by La La Anthony, former wife of basketball star Carmelo Anthony, with co-author Karen Hunter.

The book debuted at No. 2 on the Publishers Weekly hardcover nonfiction list, and at No. 1 on The New York Times advice, how-to, and miscellaneous bestseller list.

== Summary ==
Anthony coaches readers based on her own experience in life and relationships. She gives advice on being yourself, friendships, standing up for yourself, and ensuring your partner treats you like a lady. She advises against having sex on the first date, tolerating cheating, and dressing up when relaxing at home.

The book uses basketball metaphors, describing "play-by-play plans" such as "The Assist", "One-on-One", and "Game Time", which describes marriage versus the wedding.

== Adaptation ==
In 2024, Variety reported that Kim Kardashian was producing a television adaptation of The Love Playbook for Disney. The planned series, titled Group Chat, is expected to stream on Hulu.
