= List of NCAA Division I men's basketball players with 2,000 points and 1,000 rebounds =

This is a list of NCAA Division I men's basketball players who amassed both 2,000 points and 1,000 rebounds in their careers. In National Collegiate Athletic Association (NCAA) Division I basketball, recording both 2,000 points and 1,000 rebounds is an accomplishment officially recognized in the NCAA basketball record book.

In two incredibly rare instances there were players who amassed 2,000 points and 2,000 rebounds:

- Tom Gola, whose career at La Salle was between 1951 and 1955, grabbed an NCAA-record 2,201 rebounds in addition to his 2,462 points.
- Joe Holup, whose career at George Washington was between 1952 and 1956, grabbed 2,030 rebounds and scored 2,226 points.

The NCAA was not organized into its current divisional format until August 1973. From 1906 to 1955, there were no classifications to the NCAA nor its predecessor, the Intercollegiate Athletic Association of the United States (IAAUS). Then, from 1956 to spring 1973, colleges were classified as either "NCAA University Division (Major College)" or "NCAA College Division (Small College)".

Through the 2024–25 season, 19 players on this list have been enshrined into the Naismith Memorial Basketball Hall of Fame.

== Key ==
Pos.	G	F	C	Ref.
Position	Guard	Forward	Center	References

^	Player still active in NCAA Division I
*	Elected to the Naismith Memorial Basketball Hall of Fame as a player
C	Player was active in the 2020–21 season, benefiting from the NCAA's blanket COVID-19 eligibility waiver

== List ==
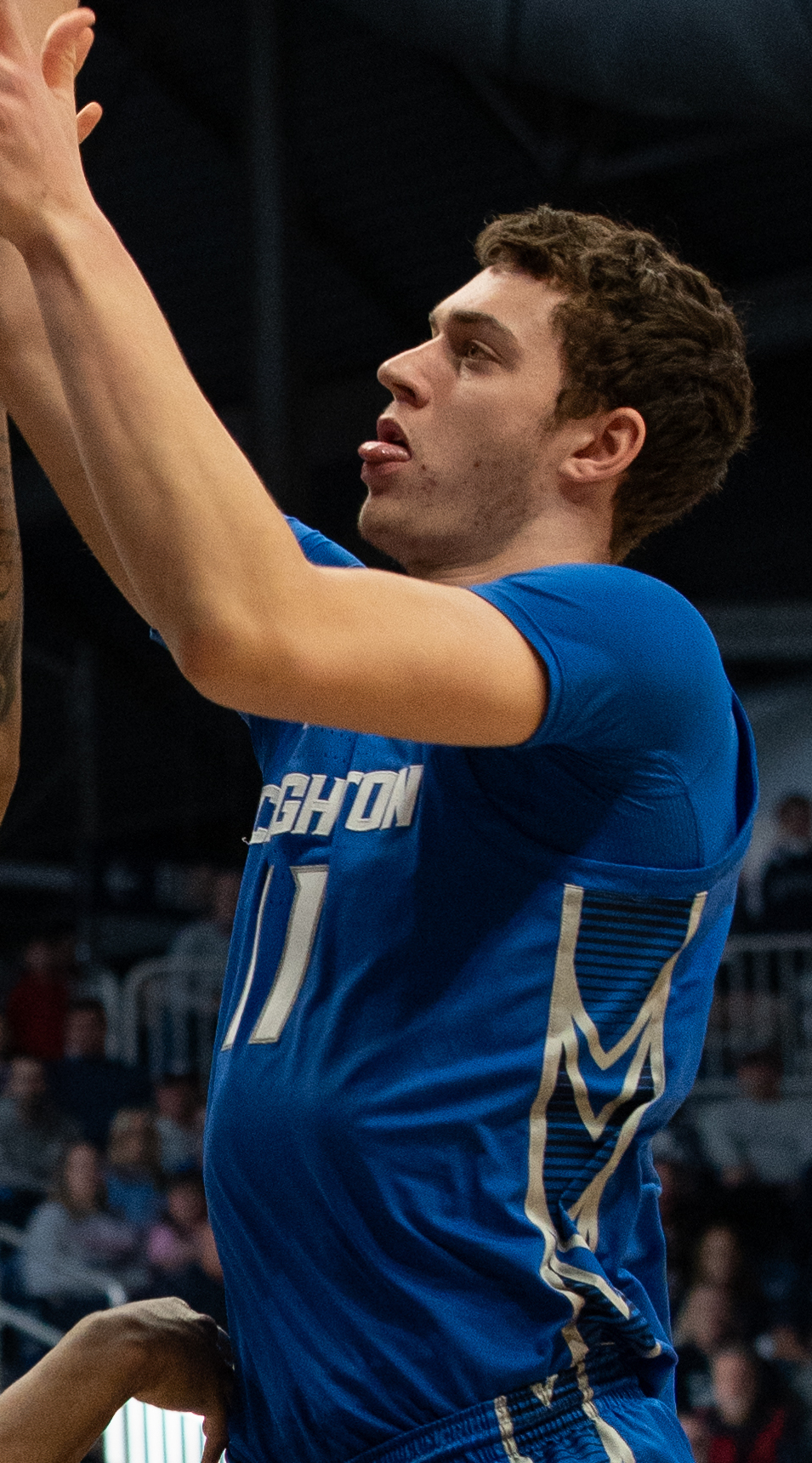
Ryan Kalkbrenner, Creighton (2020–2025)

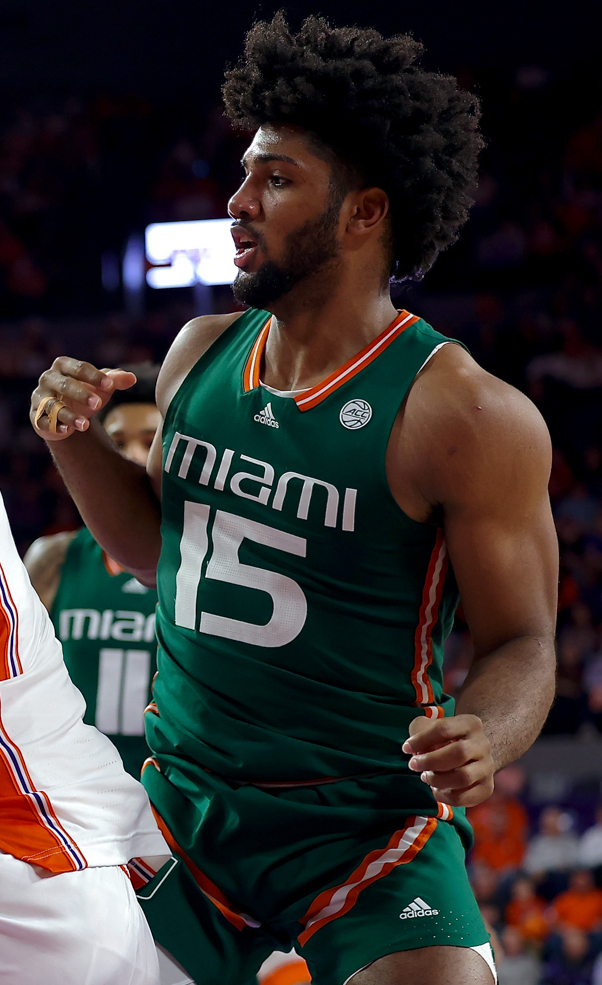
Norchad Omier, multiple schools (2020–2025)

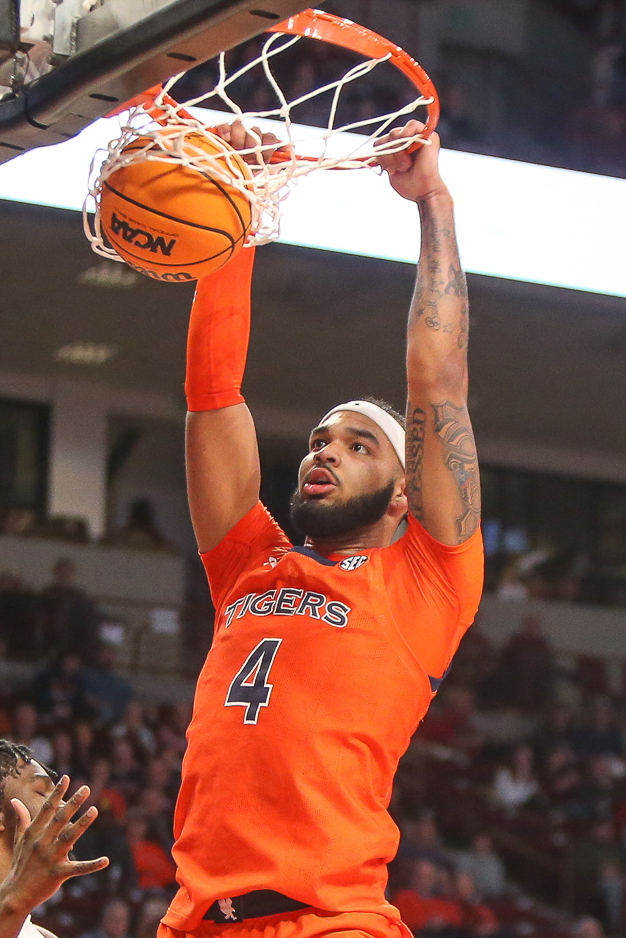
Johni Broome, multiple schools (2020–2025)

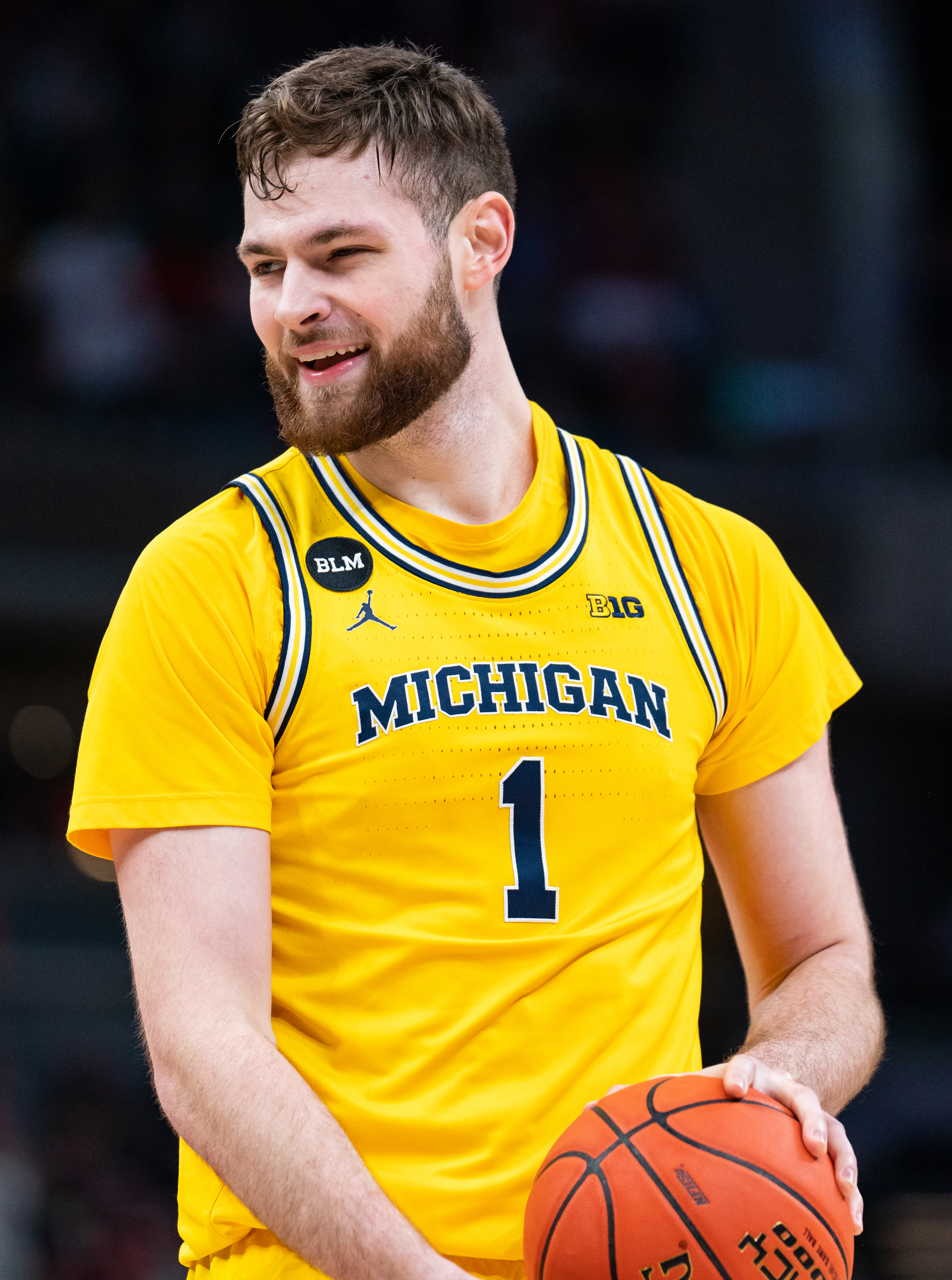
Hunter Dickinson, multiple schools (2020–2025)

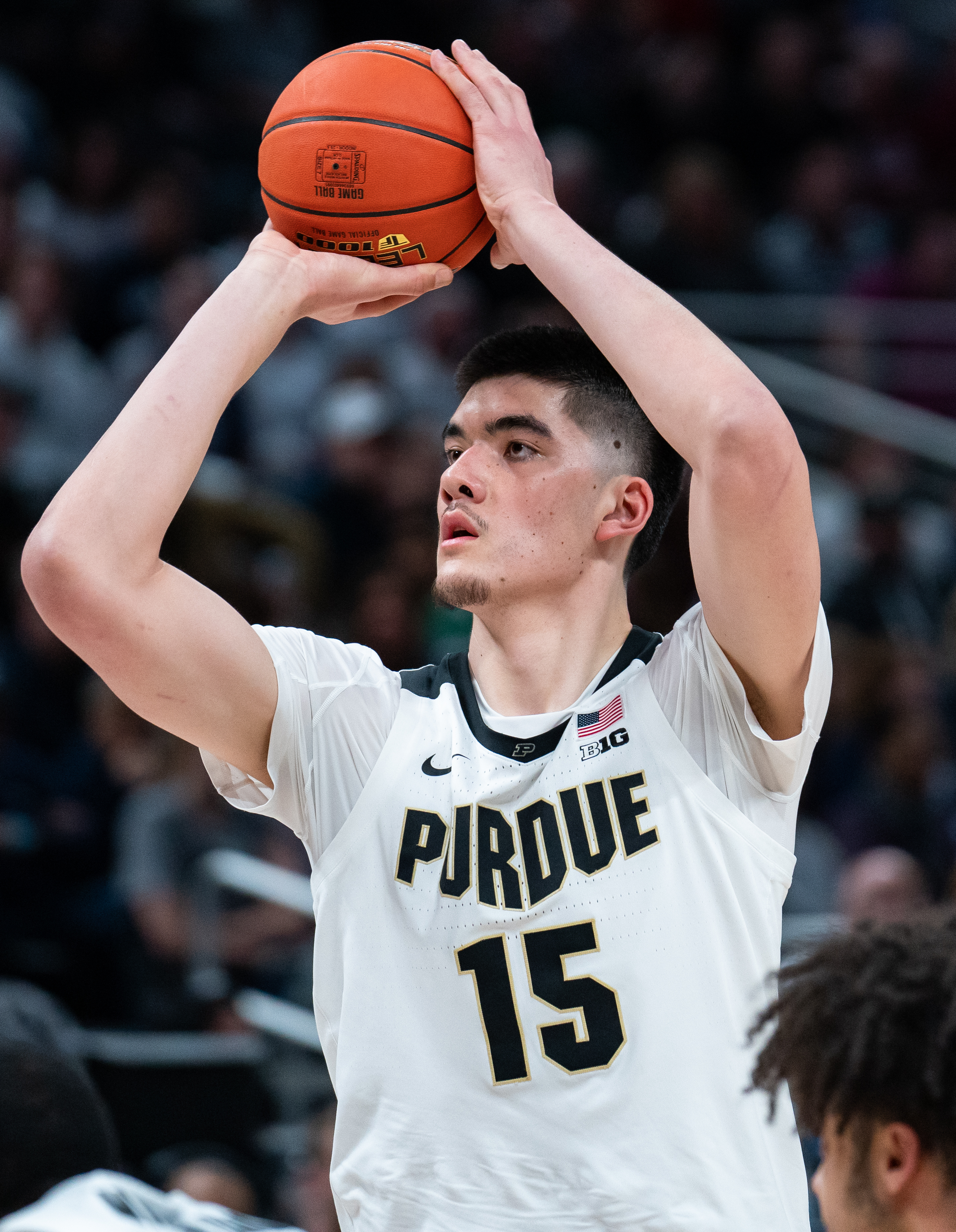
Zach Edey, Purdue (2020–2024)

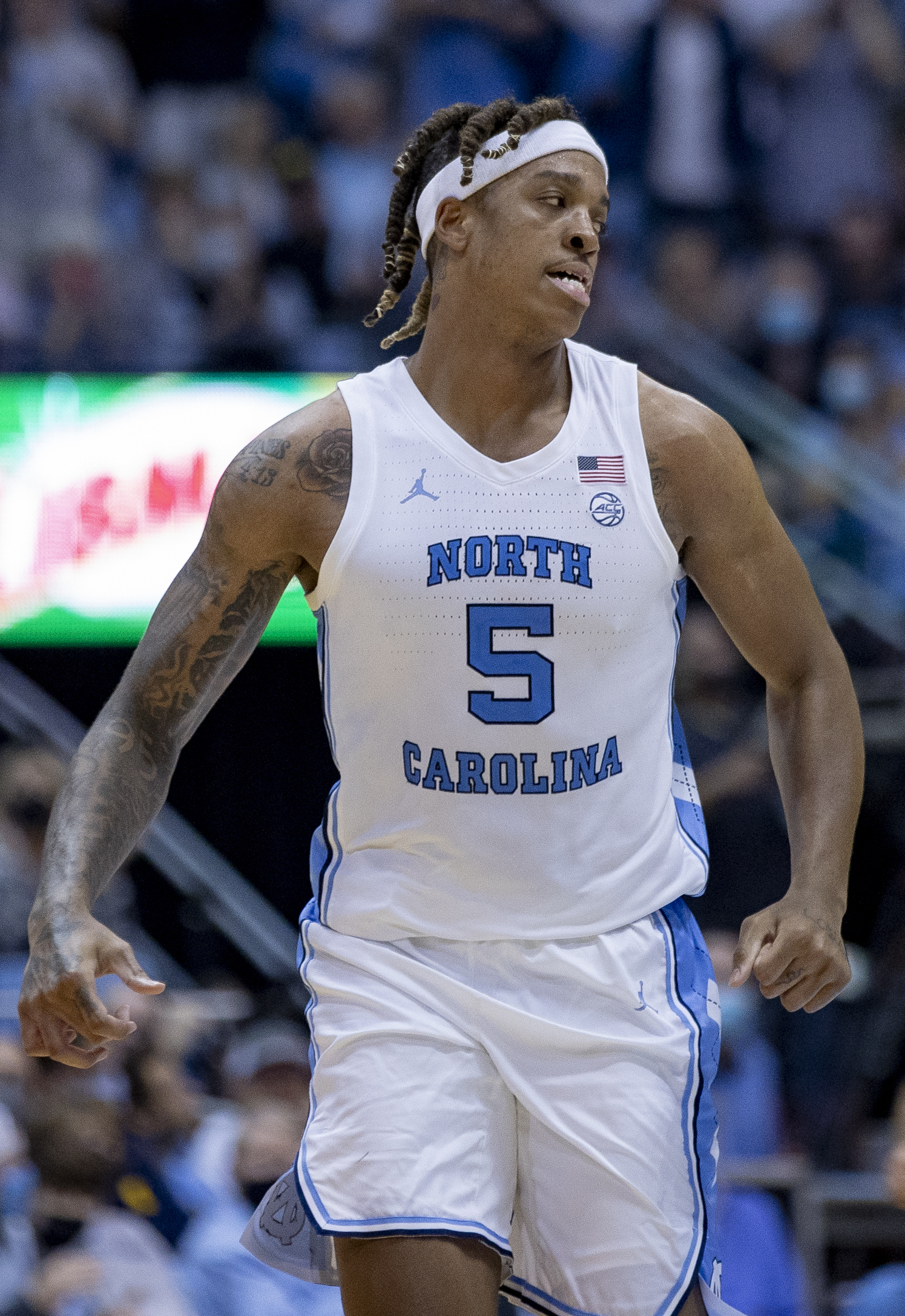
Armando Bacot, North Carolina (2019–2024)

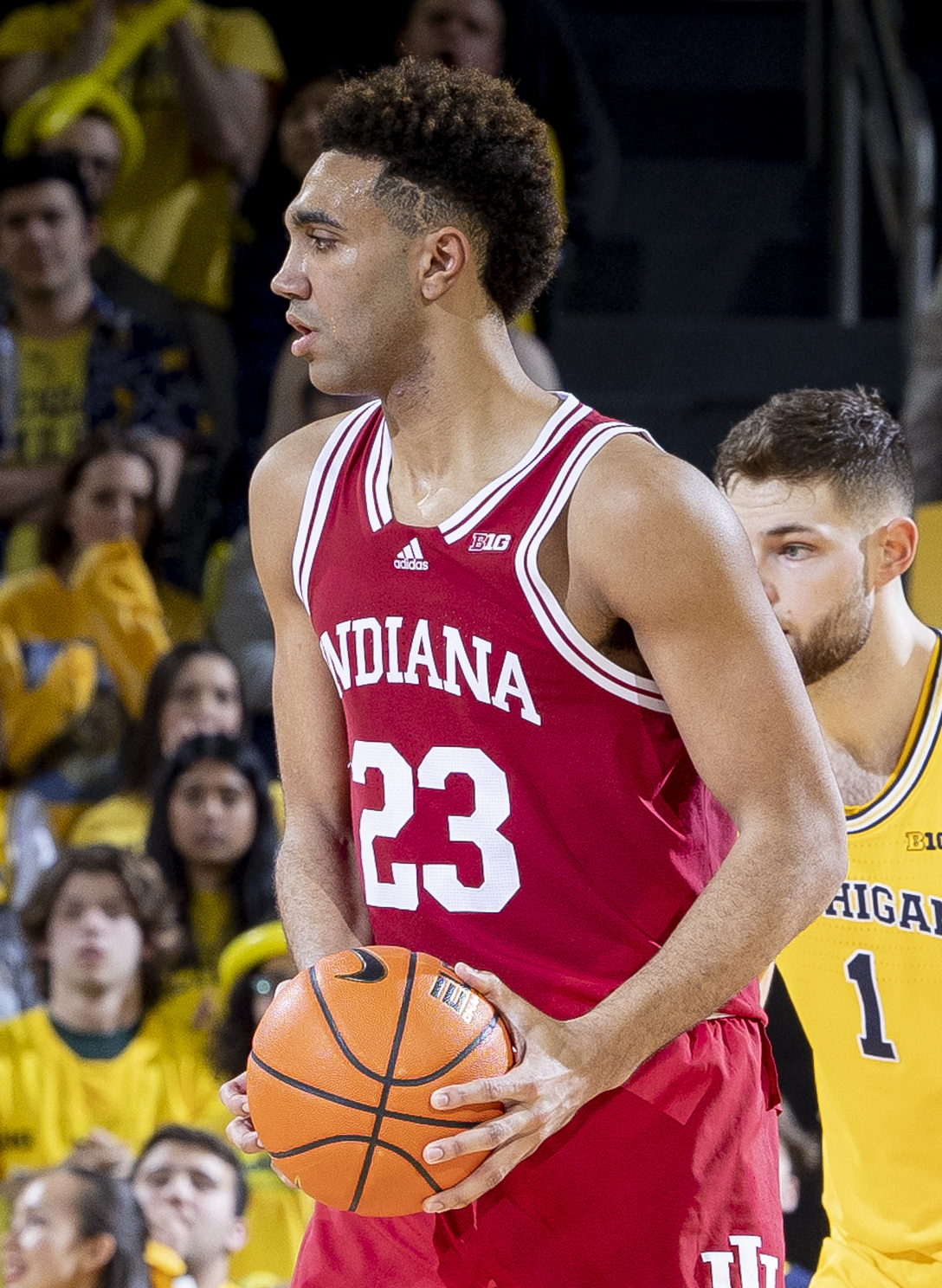
Trayce Jackson-Davis, Indiana (2019–2023)

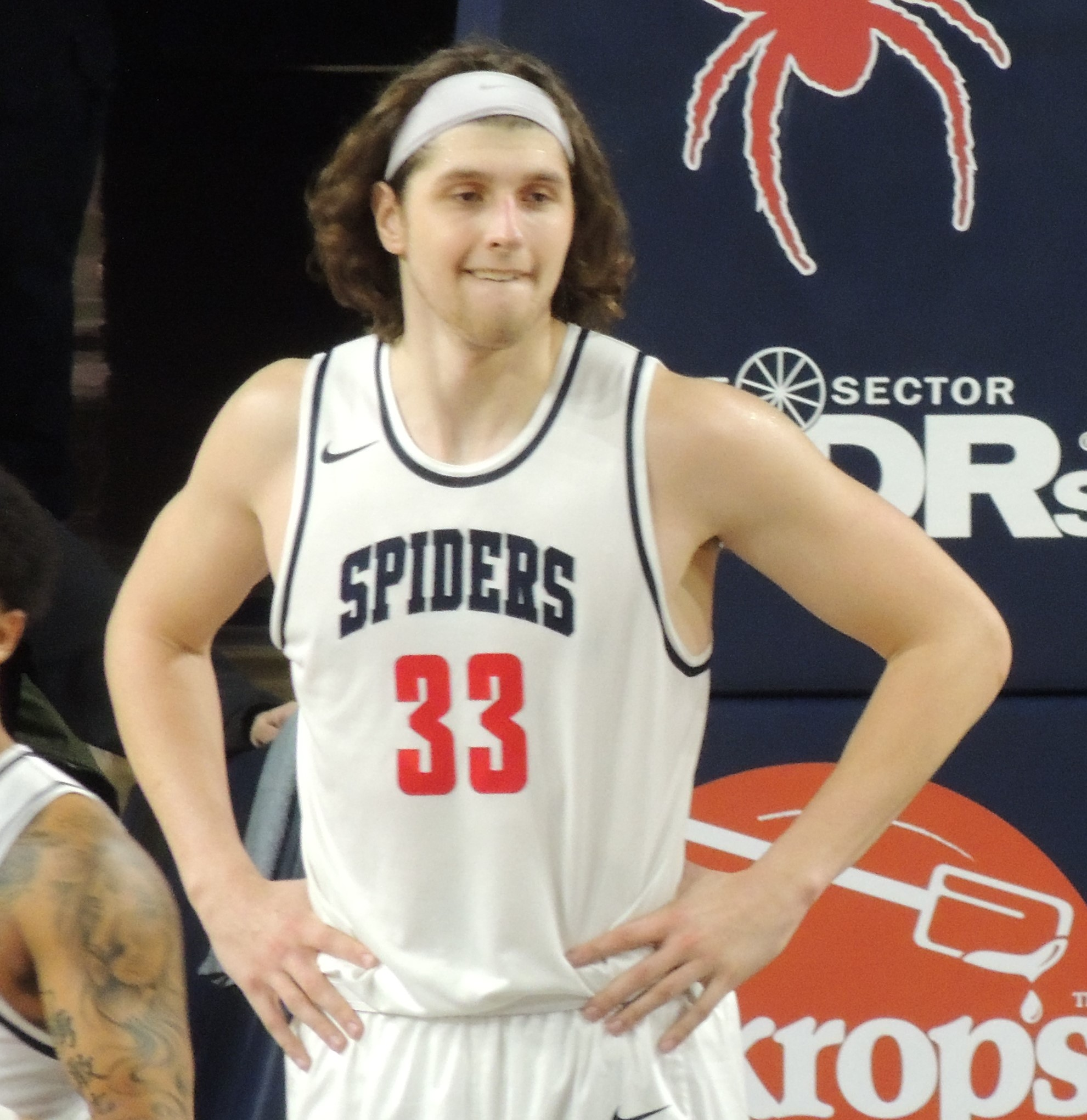
Grant Golden, Richmond (2016–2022)

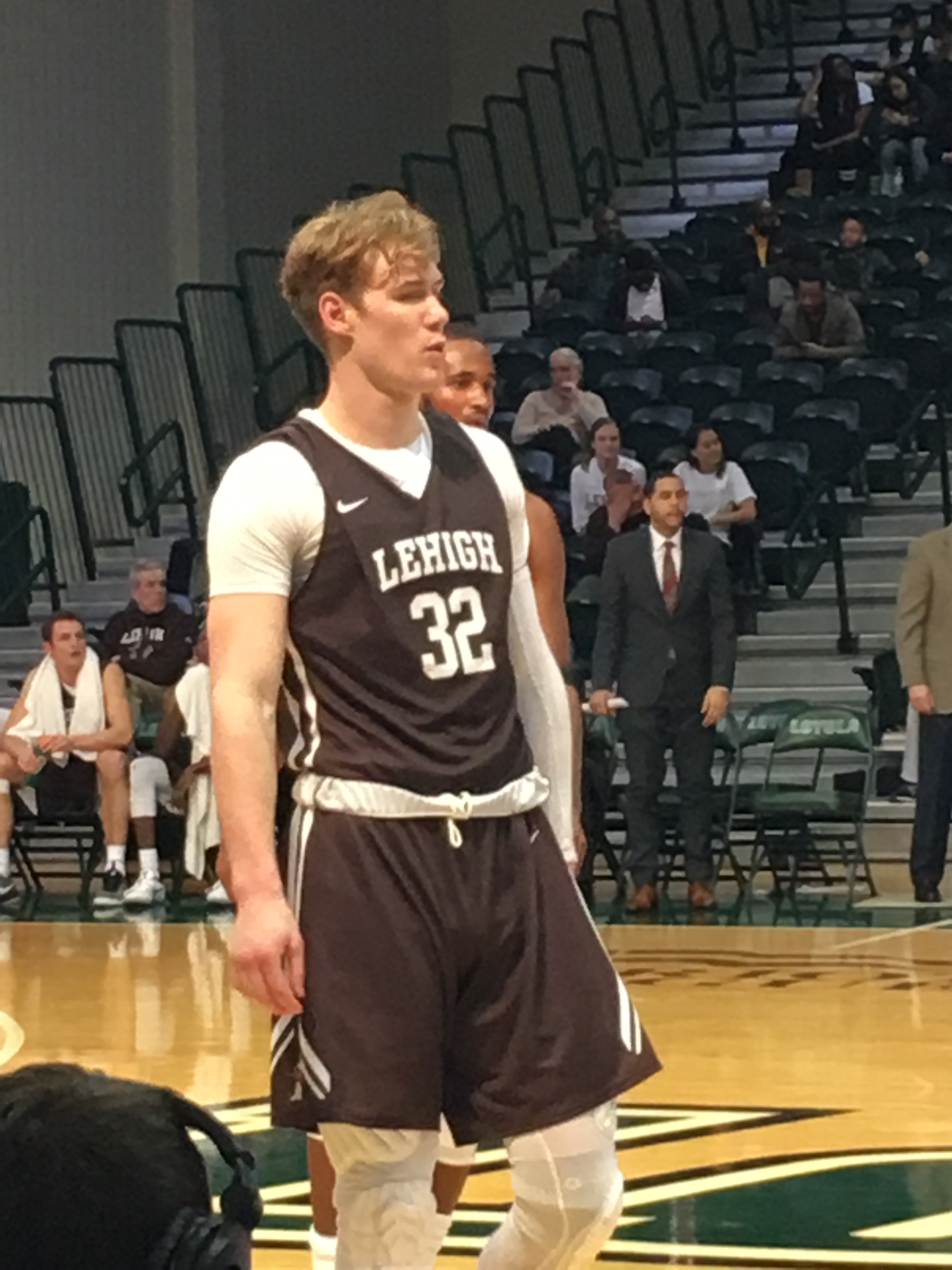
Tim Kempton Jr., Lehigh (2013–2017)

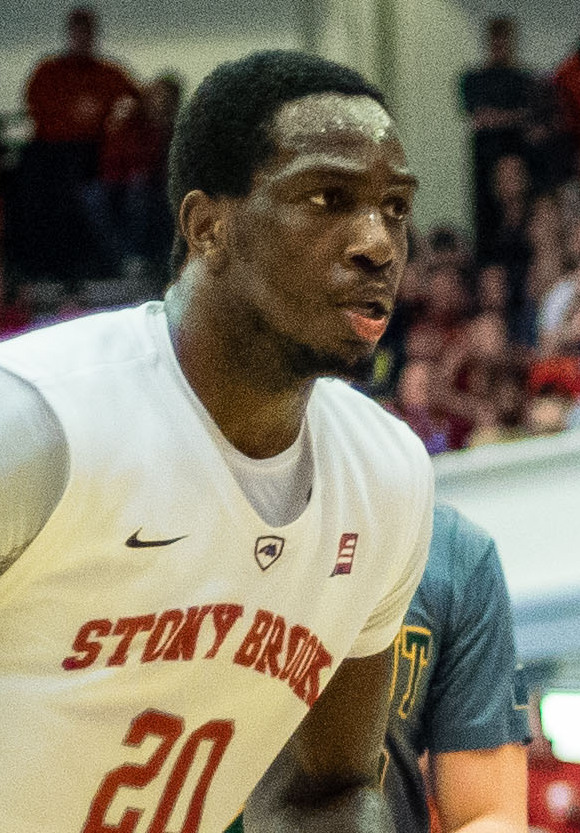
Jameel Warney, Stony Brook (2012–2016)

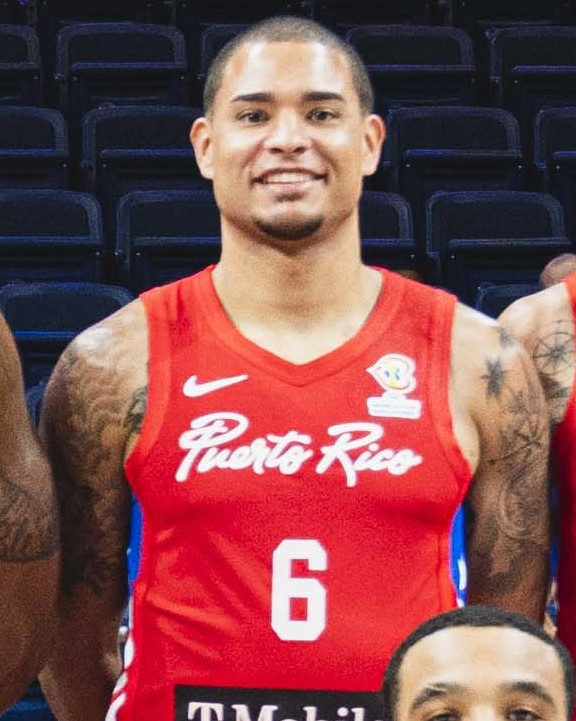
Jonathan Rodríguez, Campbell (2006–2010)

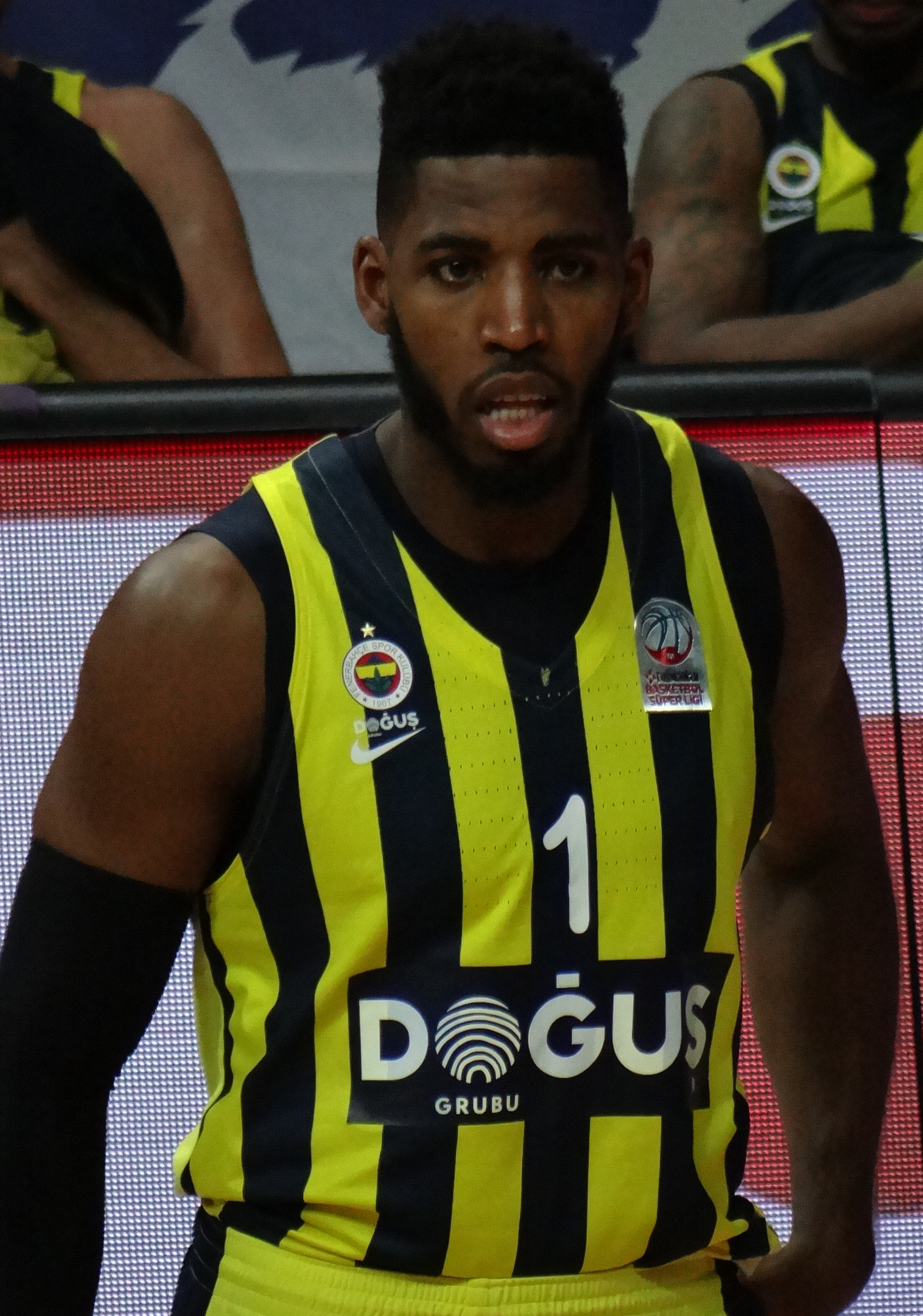
Jason Thompson, Rider (2004–2008)

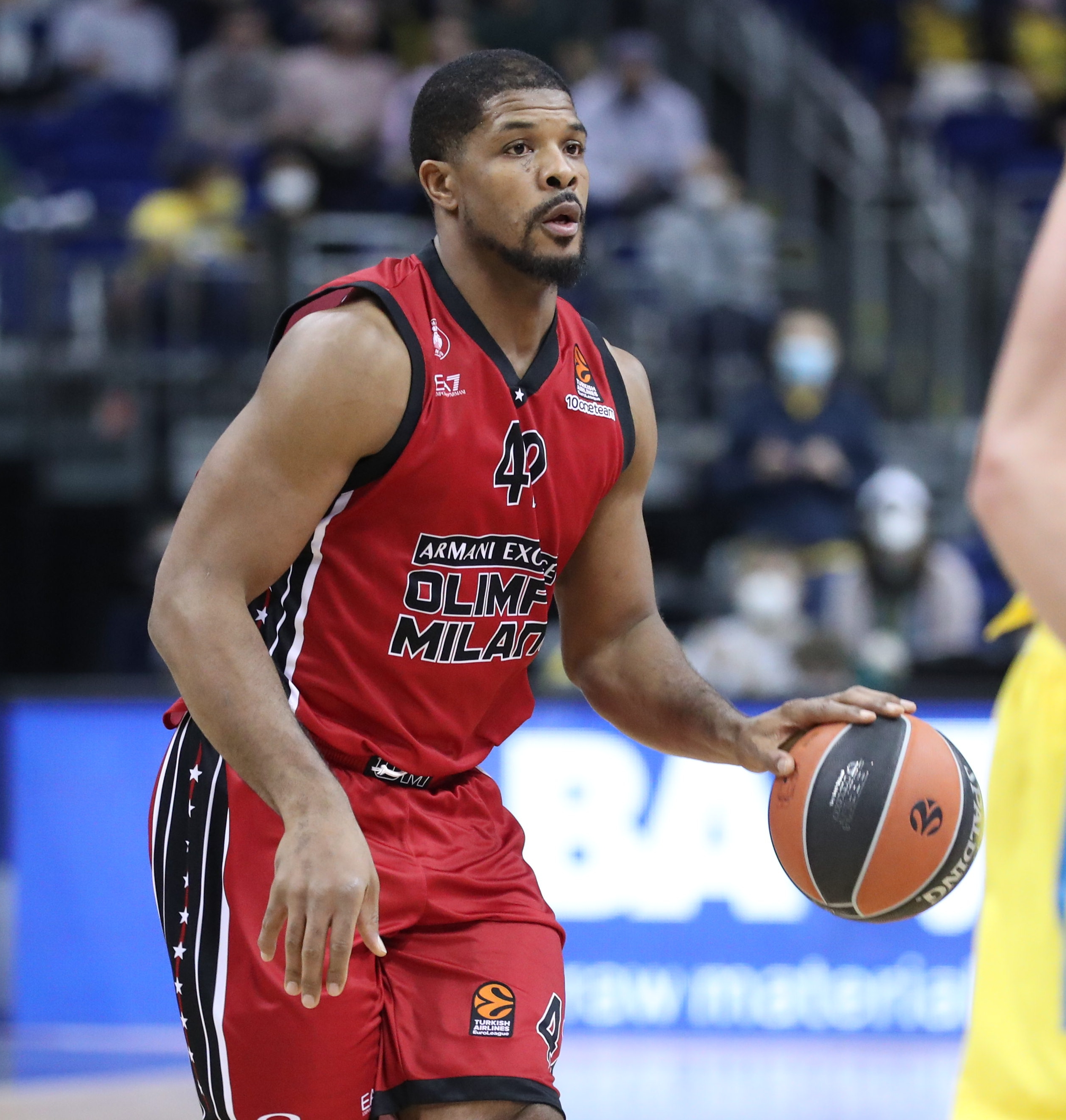
Kyle Hines, UNC Greensboro (2004–2008)

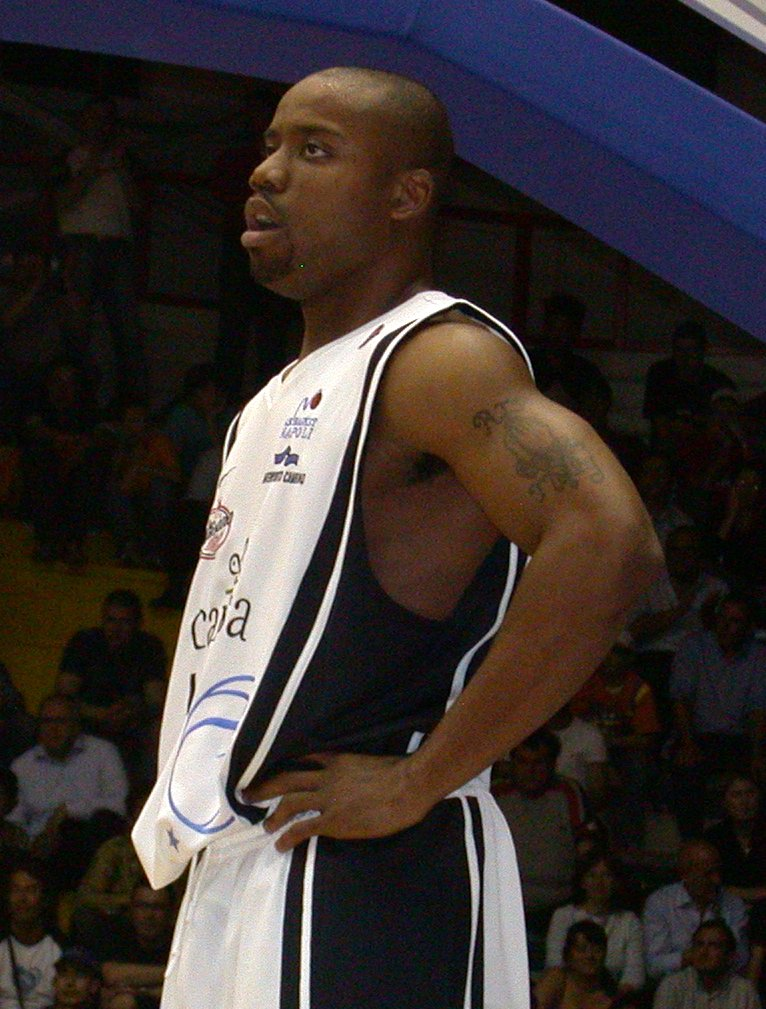
Brandon Hunter, Ohio (1999–2003)

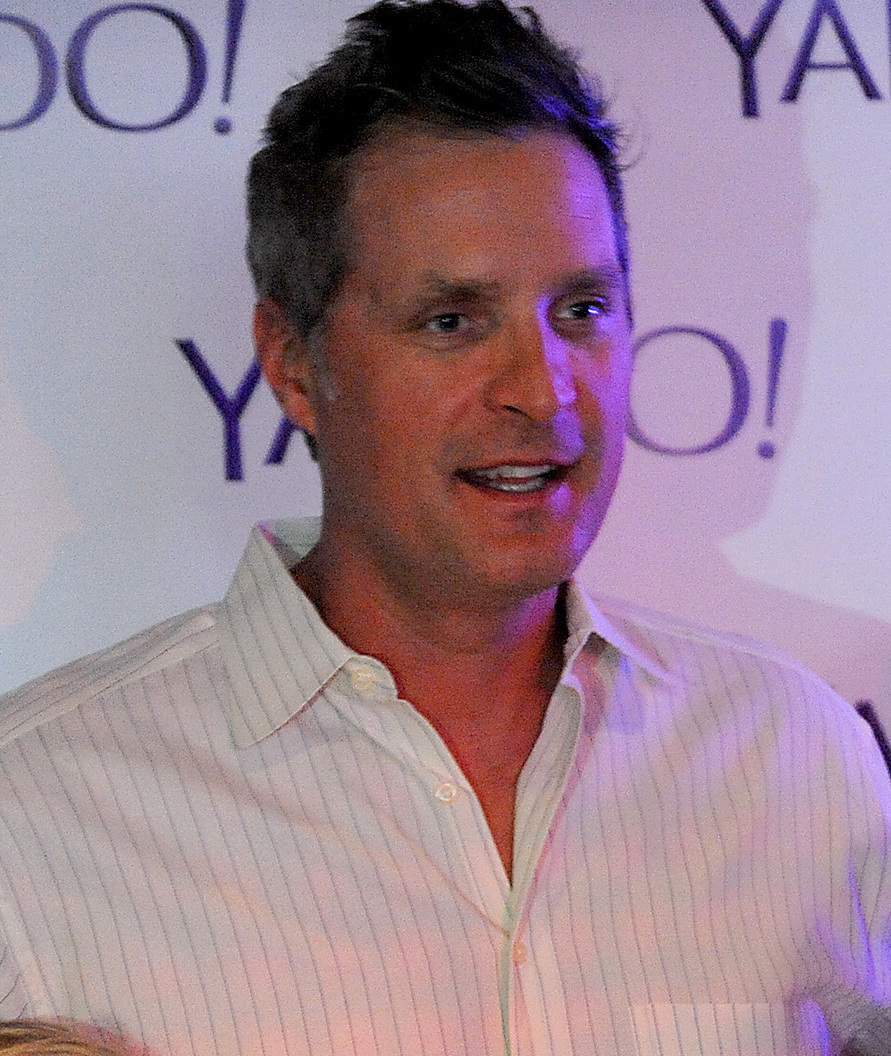
Christian Laettner, Duke (1988–1992)

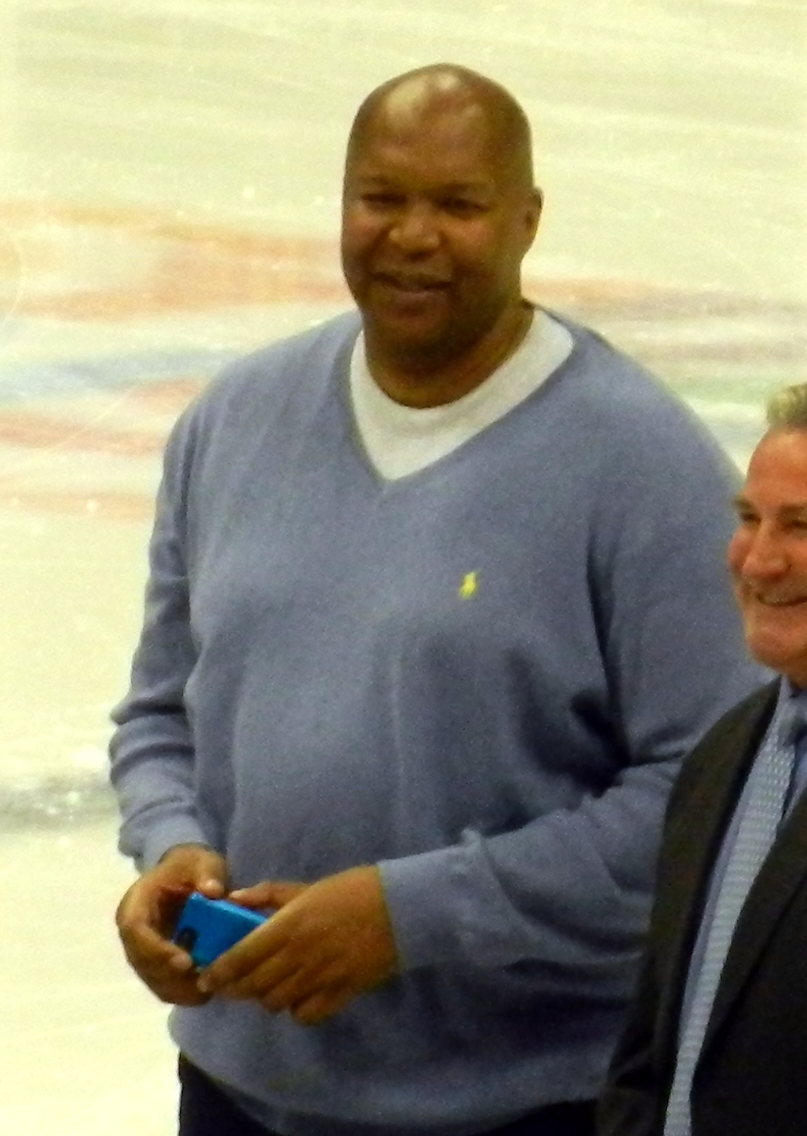
Derrick Coleman, Syracuse (1986–1990)

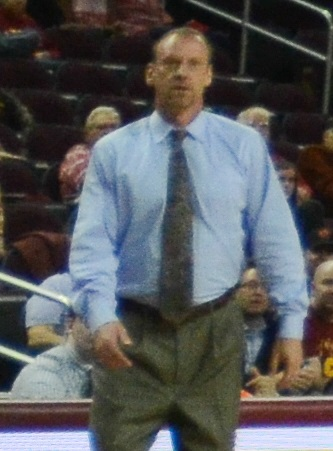
Larry Krystkowiak, Montana (1982–1986)

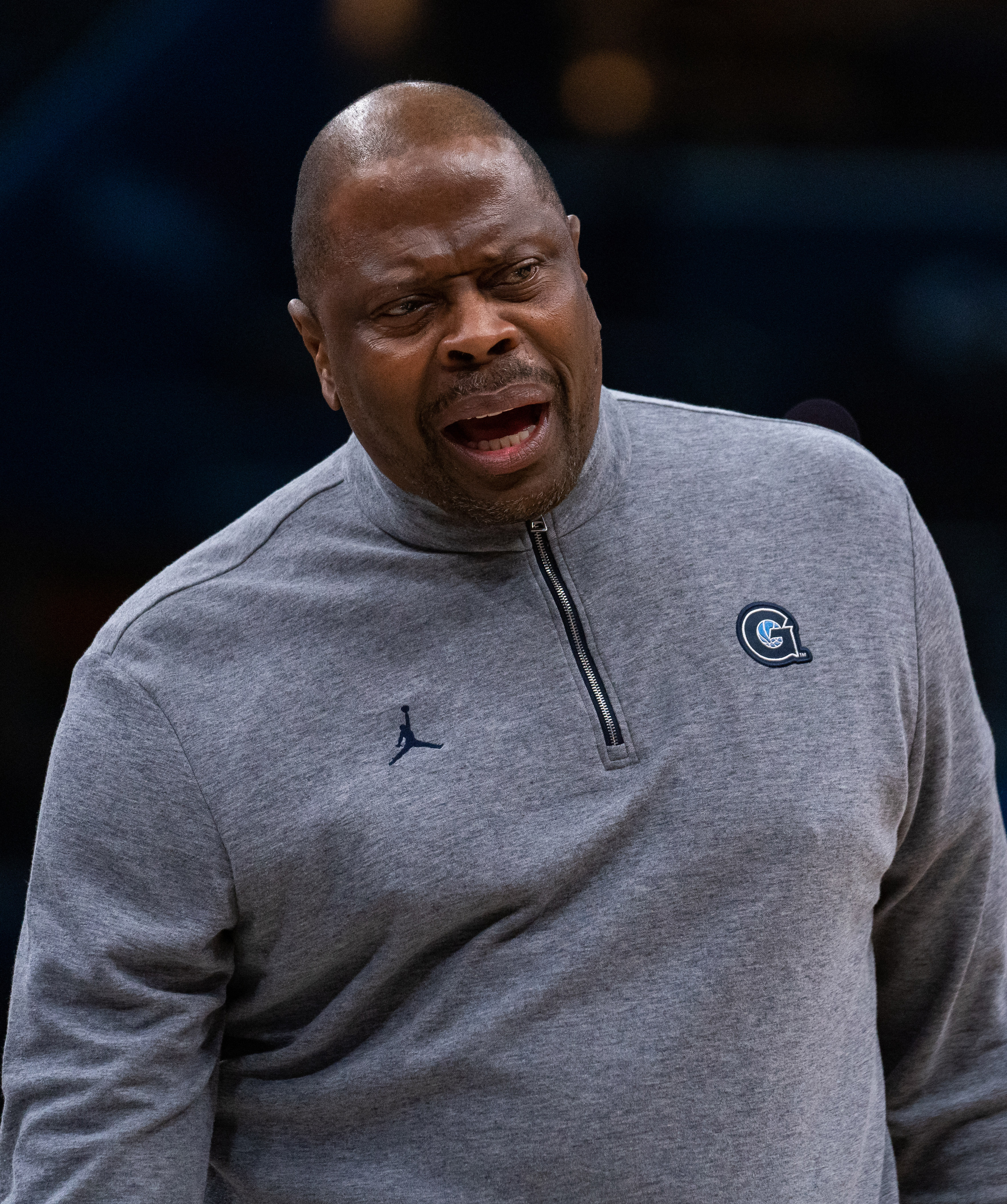
Patrick Ewing, Georgetown (1981–1985)

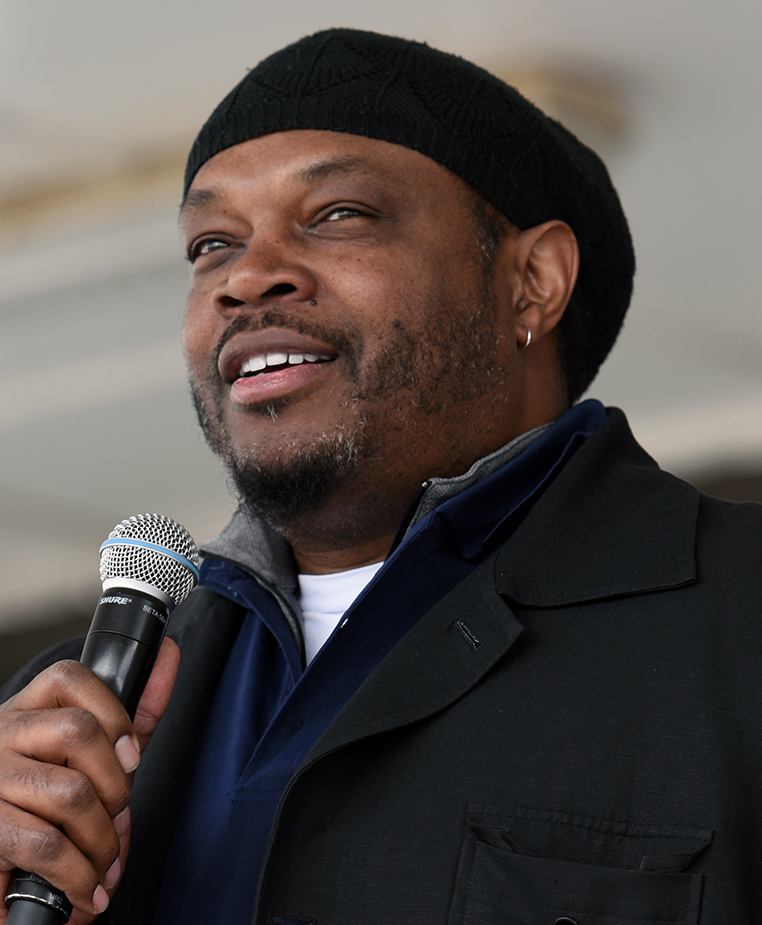
Sam Perkins, North Carolina (1980–1984)

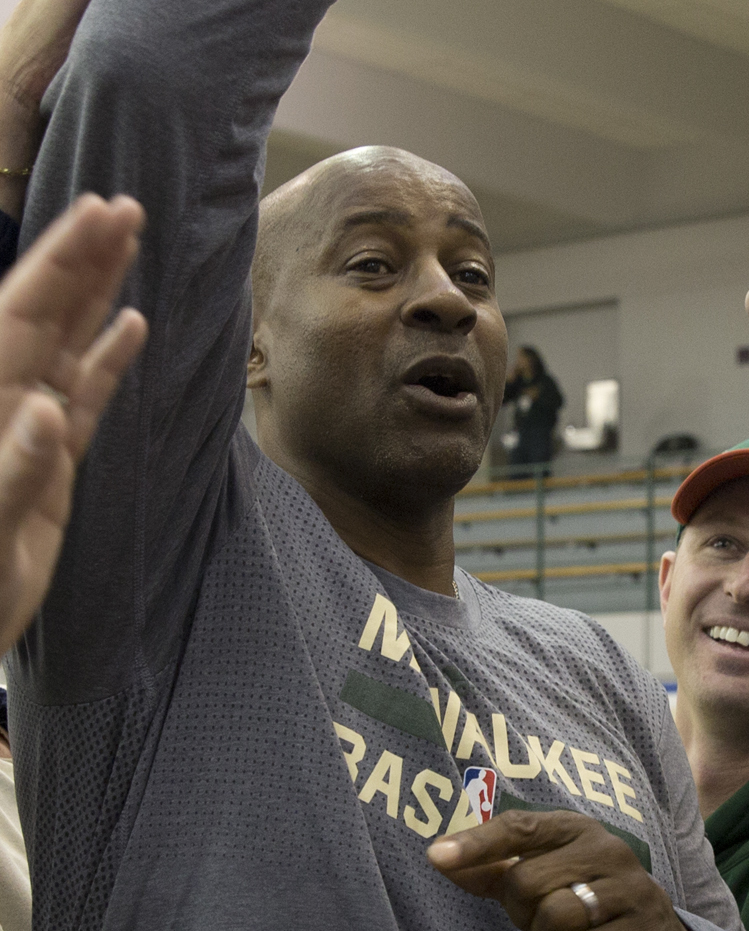
Sidney Moncrief, Arkansas (1975–1979)

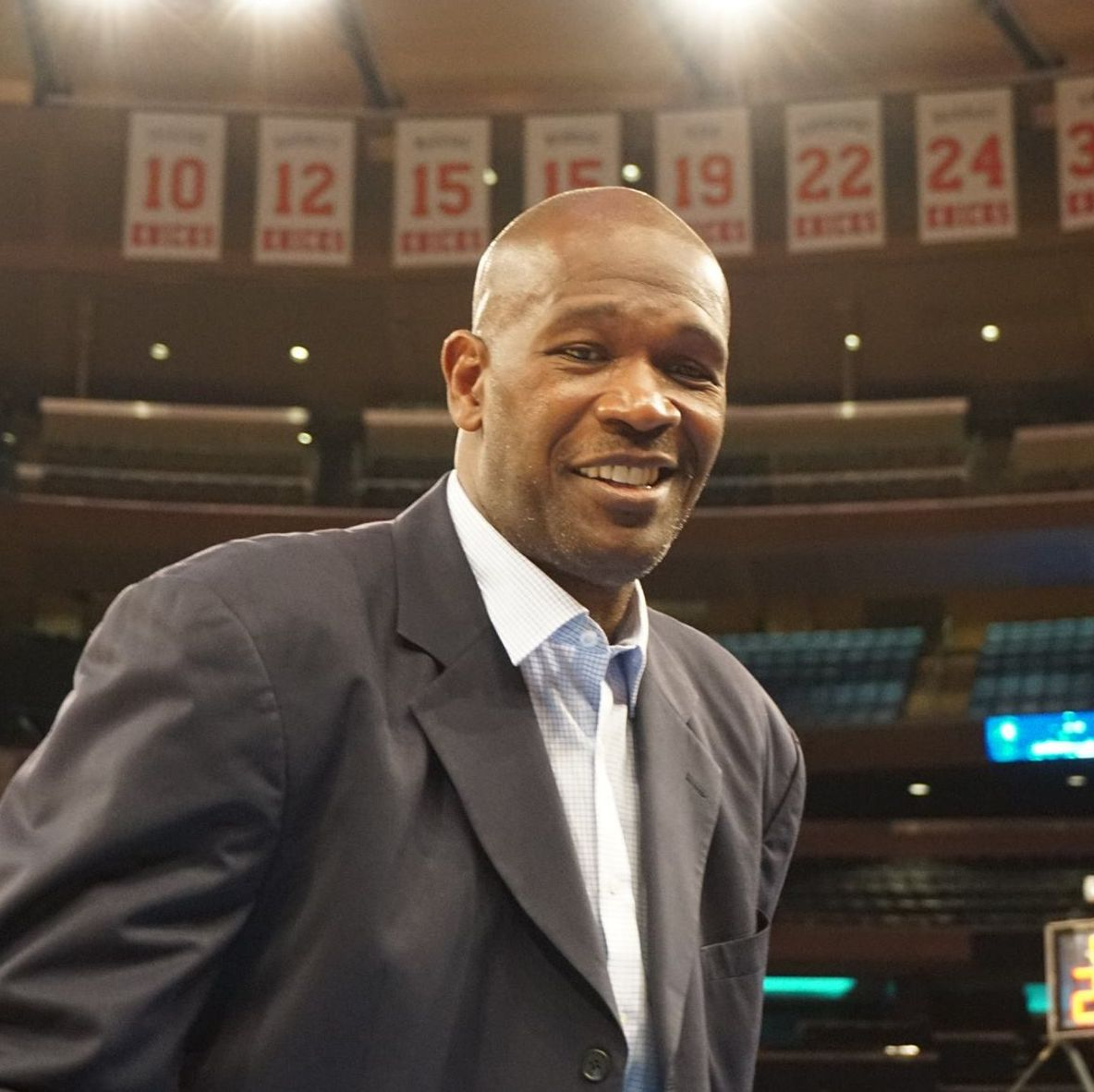
Herb Williams, Ohio State (1977–1981)

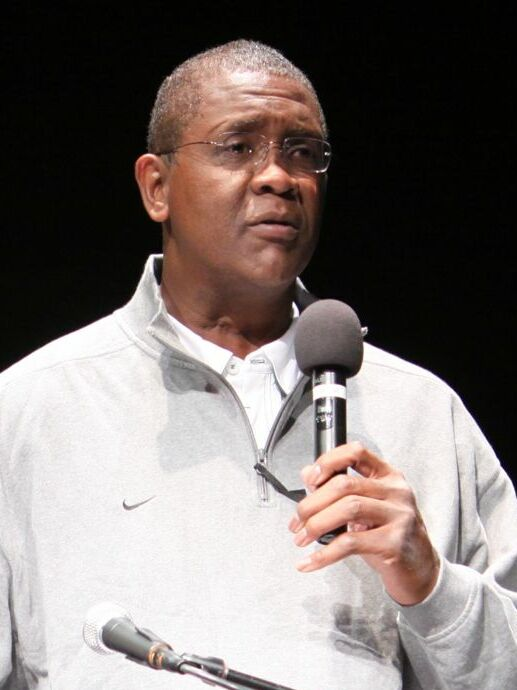
Bill Cartwright, San Francisco (1975–1979)

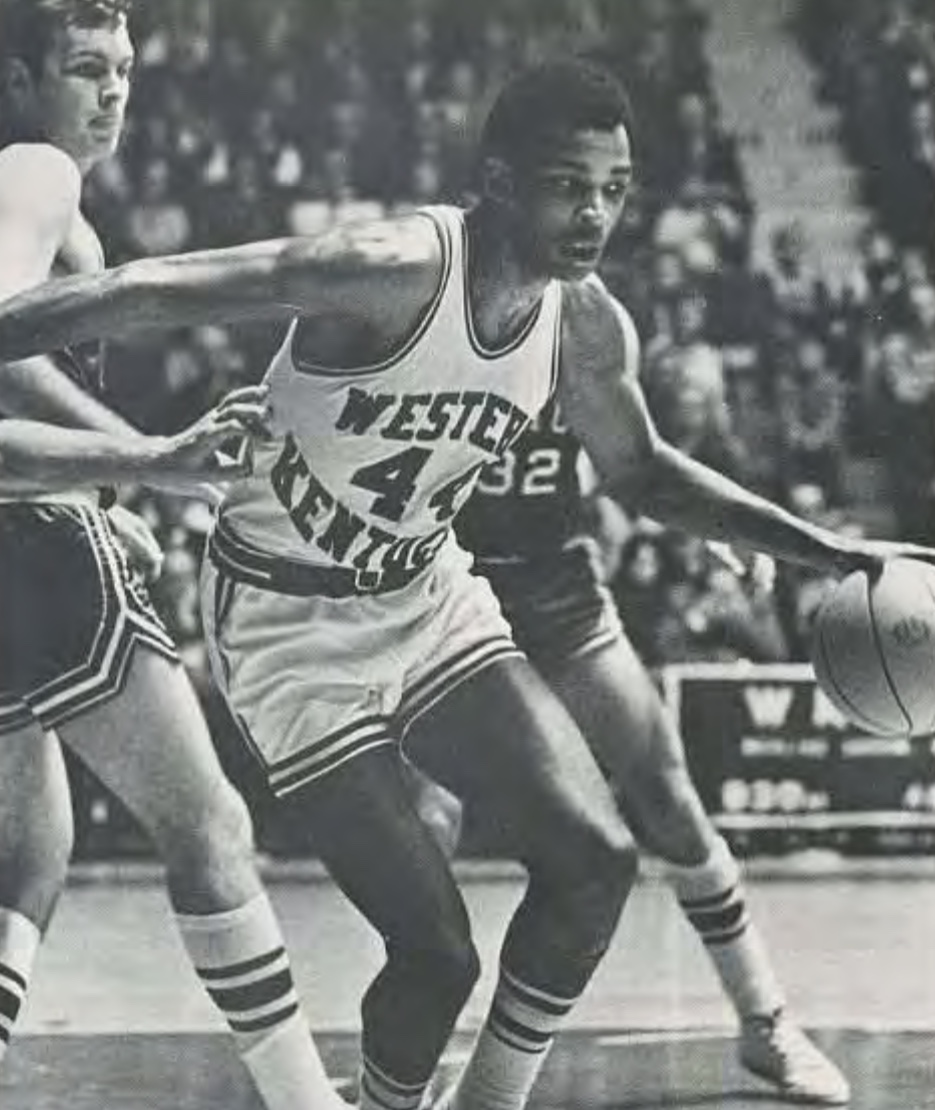
Jim McDaniels, Western Kentucky (1968–1971)

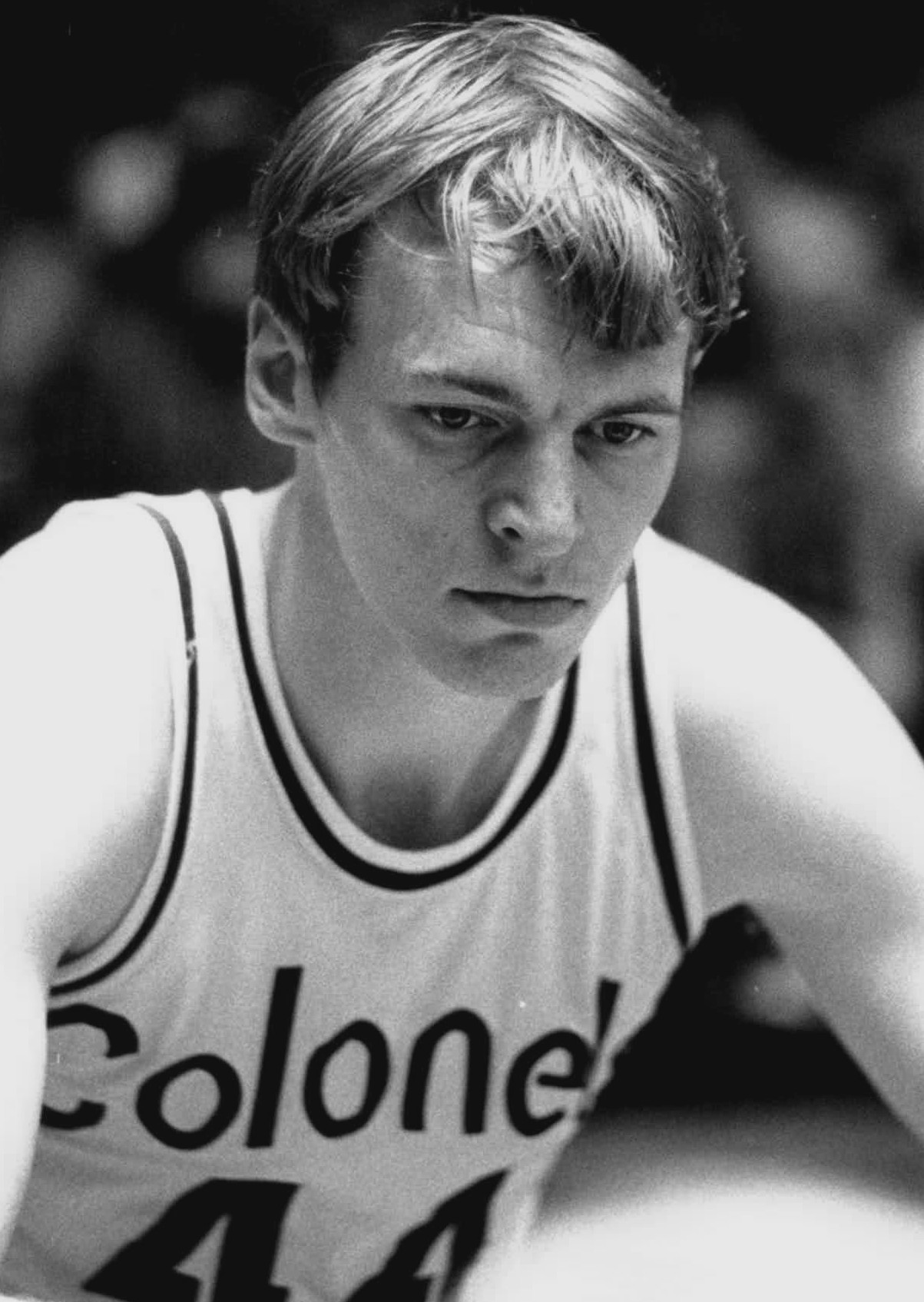
Dan Issel, Kentucky (1967–1970)

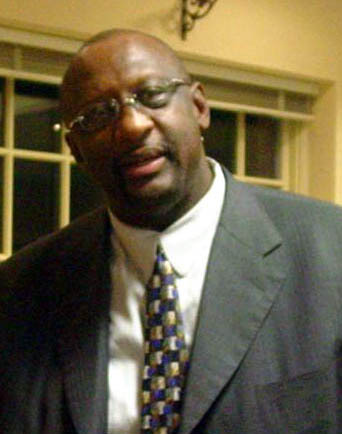
Bob Lanier, St. Bonaventure (1967–1970)

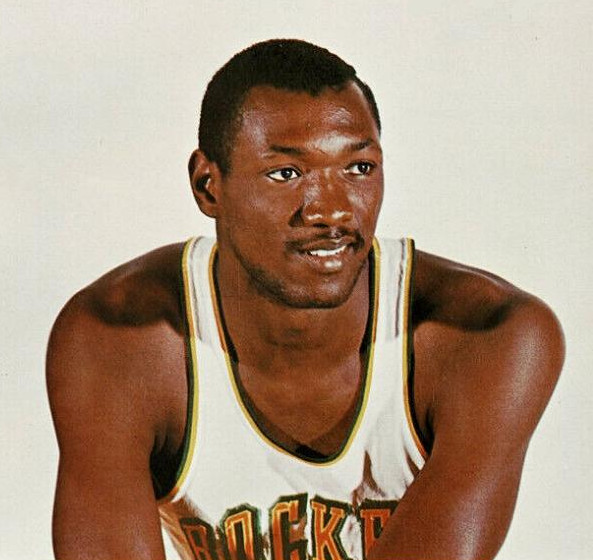
Elvin Hayes, Houston (1964–1968)

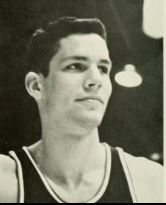
Fred Hetzel, Davidson (1962–1965)

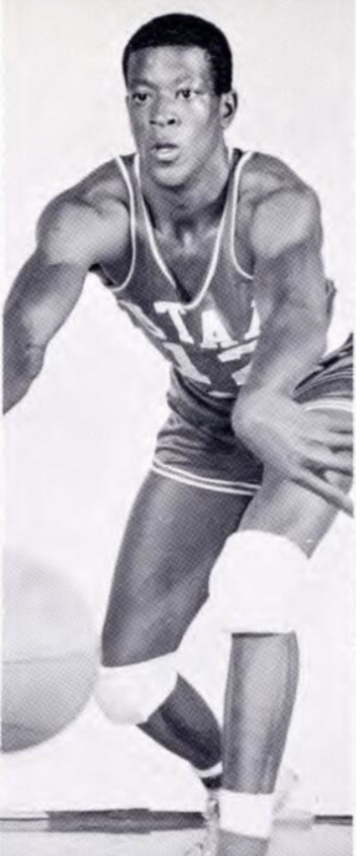
Bill McGill, Utah (1959–1962)

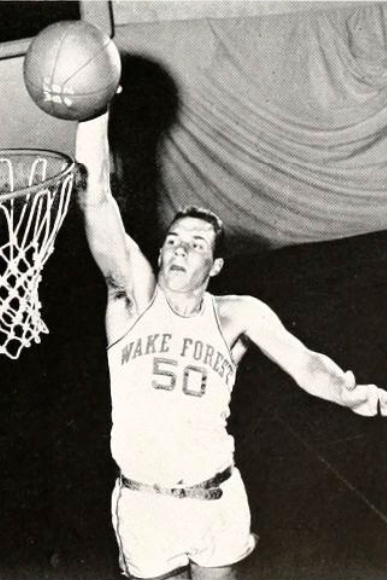
Len Chappell, Wake Forest (1959–1962)

Jeff Cohen, William & Mary (1958–1961)

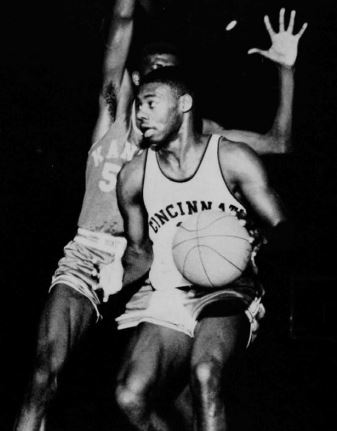
Oscar Robertson, Cincinnati (1957–1960)

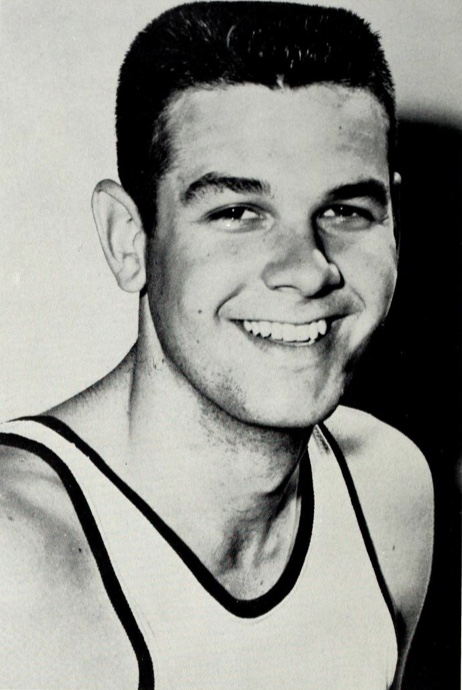
Bailey Howell, Mississippi State (1956–1959)

Player	Pos.	Team(s)	Career start	Career end	Games	Points	PPG	Rebounds	RPG	Ref.
Graham Ike^{C}	F	Wyoming / Gonzaga	2020	2026	146	2,575	17.6	1,144	7.8	
Trey Townsend^{C}	F	Oakland / Arizona	2020	2025	164	2,101	12.8	1,027	6.3	
Ryan Kalkbrenner^{C}	C	Creighton	2020	2025	169	2,443	14.5	1,146	6.8	
Norchad Omier^{C}	F	Arkansas State / Miami (Florida) / Baylor	2020	2025	155	2,374	15.3	1,694	10.9	
Johni Broome^{C}	F/C	Morehead State / Auburn	2020	2025	168	2,698	16.1	1,594	9.5	
Hunter Dickinson^{C}	C	Michigan / Kansas	2020	2025	161	2,800	17.4	1,488	9.2	
Zach Edey (Note: These players were active in the 2020–21 season but chose not to take advantage of the NCAA's COVID-19 eligibility waiver.)	C	Purdue	2020	2024	138	2,516	18.2	1,321	9.6	
Baylor Scheierman^{C}	SG	South Dakota State / Creighton	2019	2024	162	2,233	13.8	1,256	7.8	
Armando Bacot^{C}	C/F	North Carolina	2019	2024	169	2,348	13.9	1,715	10.1	
Trayce Jackson-Davis	F/C	Indiana	2019	2023	126	2,258	17.9	1,143	9.1	
Jayden Gardner^{C}	F	East Carolina / Virginia	2018	2023	149	2,395	16.0	1,120	7.5	
KJ Williams^{C}	F	Murray State / LSU	2018	2023	157	2,250	14.3	1,142	7.3	
Kevin Obanor^{C}	F	Oral Roberts / Texas Tech	2018	2023	156	2,137	13.7	1,093	7.0	
Grant Golden^{C}	F	Richmond	2016	2022	161	2,246	13.9	1,015	6.3	
Terry Taylor	F/G	Austin Peay	2017	2021	127	2,507	19.7	1,248	9.8	
Keith Braxton	G	Saint Francis (PA)	2016	2020	130	2,067	15.9	1,149	8.8	
Yoeli Childs	F	BYU	2016	2020	119	2,031	17.1	1,053	8.8	
Mike Daum	F	South Dakota State	2015	2019	137	3,067	22.4	1,236	9.0	
Ethan Happ	F	Wisconsin	2015	2019	139	2,130	15.3	1,217	8.8	
John Konchar	G	Purdue Fort Wayne (Note: During his college career, Konchar's team represented two different universities and used three different athletic brand names. Konchar began his college career in 2015 at Indiana University – Purdue University Fort Wayne, branded in both academics and athletics as IPFW. The athletic program changed its branding to Fort Wayne in 2016–17. After the 2017–18 school year, the Indiana University and Purdue University systems dissolved IPFW, with each institution establishing its own Fort Wayne campus. The athletic program transferred to the larger of the two new institutions, Purdue University Fort Wayne, under the "Purdue Fort Wayne" brand.)	2015	2019	133	2,065	15.5	1,149	8.6	
Drew McDonald	F/C	Northern Kentucky	2015	2019	131	2,066	15.8	1,081	8.3	
Jordan Caroline	G/F	Southern Illinois / Nevada	2014	2019	138	2,045	14.8	1,164	8.4	
Tim Kempton Jr.	F/C	Lehigh	2013	2017	122	2,043	16.6	1,091	8.9	
Shawn Long	F	Louisiana	2012	2016	135	2,342	17.3	1,447	10.7	
Jameel Warney	F/C	Stony Brook	2012	2016	135	2,132	15.7	1,275	9.4	
LaDontae Henton	F	Providence	2011	2015	135	2,059	15.3	1,054	7.8	
Doug McDermott	F	Creighton	2010	2014	145	3,150	21.7	1,088	7.5	
Mike Muscala	C	Bucknell	2009	2013	134	2,036	15.3	1,093	8.2	
Kyle Singler	G/F	Duke	2007	2011	148	2,392	16.2	1,015	6.9	
Kenneth Faried	C	Morehead State	2007	2011	136	2,009	14.8	1,673	12.3	
Luke Harangody	F/C	Notre Dame	2006	2010	129	2,476	19.2	1,221	9.5	
Jonathan Rodríguez	F	Campbell	2006	2010	121	2,153	17.8	1,066	8.8	
Tyler Hansbrough	F/C	North Carolina	2005	2009	142	2,872	20.2	1,219	8.6	
Jason Thompson	C	Rider	2004	2008	122	2,040	16.7	1,171	9.6	
Arizona Reid	F	High Point	2004	2008	120	2,069	17.2	1,013	8.4	
Kyle Hines	F/C	UNC Greensboro	2004	2008	120	2,187	18.2	1,047	8.7	
Caleb Green	F	Oral Roberts	2003	2007	128	2,503	19.6	1,189	9.3	
Nick Fazekas	F/C	Nevada	2003	2007	131	2,464	18.8	1,254	9.6	
Craig Smith	F	Boston College	2002	2006	130	2,349	18.1	1,114	8.6	
Juan Mendez	F	Niagara	2001	2005	123	2,210	18.0	1,053	8.6	
Ryan Gomes	F	Providence	2001	2005	116	2,138	18.4	1,028	8.9	
Hakim Warrick	F/C	Syracuse	2001	2005	135	2,073	15.4	1,026	7.6	
Mike Harris	F	Rice	2001	2005	121	2,014	16.6	1,111	9.2	
David West	F	Xavier	1999	2003	126	2,132	16.9	1,309	10.4	
Nick Collison	F/C	Kansas	1999	2003	142	2,097	14.8	1,143	8.0	
Brandon Hunter	F	Ohio	1999	2003	119	2,012	16.9	1,103	9.3	
Raef LaFrentz	C	Kansas	1994	1998	131	2,066	15.8	1,186	9.1	
Keith Van Horn	F	Utah	1993	1997	122	2,542	20.8	1,074	8.8	
Tunji Awojobi	F	Boston University	1993	1997	114	2,308	20.2	1,237	10.9	
Tim Duncan*	F/C	Wake Forest	1993	1997	128	2,117	16.5	1,570	12.3	
Odell Hodge	F/C	Old Dominion	1992	1997	128	2,117	16.5	1,086	8.5	
Danya Abrams	F	Boston College	1993	1997	122	2,053	16.8	1,029	8.4	
John Wallace	F	Syracuse	1992	1996	127	2,119	16.7	1,065	8.4	
Malik Rose	F	Drexel	1992	1996	120	2,024	16.9	1,514	12.6	
Bryant Reeves	C	Oklahoma State	1991	1995	136	2,367	17.4	1,152	8.5	
Reggie Jackson	F	Nicholls	1991	1995	110	2,124	19.3	1,271	11.6	
Gary Trent	F	Ohio	1992	1995	93	2,108	22.7	1,050	11.3	
Josh Grant	F	Utah	1988	1993	131	2,000	15.3	1,066	8.1	
Christian Laettner	F	Duke	1988	1992	148	2,460	16.6	1,149	7.8	
Byron Houston	F	Oklahoma State	1988	1992	127	2,379	18.7	1,190	9.4	
Adam Keefe	F/C	Stanford	1988	1992	125	2,319	18.6	1,119	9.0	
Clarence Weatherspoon	F	Southern Miss	1988	1992	117	2,130	18.2	1,320	11.3	
Popeye Jones	F	Murray State	1988	1992	123	2,057	16.7	1,374	11.2	
Alonzo Mourning*	C	Georgetown	1988	1992	120	2,001	16.7	1,032	8.6	
Tom Davis	F	Delaware State	1987	1991	95	2,274	23.9	1,013	10.7	
Doug Smith	F/C	Missouri	1987	1991	128	2,184	17.1	1,305	8.2	
Bob Harstad	F	Creighton	1987	1991	128	2,110	16.5	1,126	8.8	
Stacey Augmon	G/F	UNLV	1987	1991	145	2,011	13.9	1,005	6.9	
Lionel Simmons	F	La Salle	1986	1990	131	3,217	24.6	1,429	10.9	
Hank Gathers	F/C	USC / Loyola Marymount	1986	1990	117	2,723	23.3	1,128	9.6	
Derrick Coleman	F/C	Syracuse	1986	1990	143	2,143	15.0	1,537	10.7	
Fred West	F	Texas Southern	1986	1990	118	2,066	17.5	1,136	9.6	
Tyrone Hill	F	Xavier	1986	1990	126	2,003	15.9	1,380	10.9	
Kenny Sanders	F	George Mason	1985	1989	107	2,177	20.3	1,026	9.6	
Danny Ferry	F	Duke	1985	1989	143	2,155	15.1	1,003	7.0	
Pervis Ellison	F/C	Louisville	1985	1989	136	2,143	15.8	1,149	8.4	
Danny Manning	F/C	Kansas	1984	1988	147	2,951	20.1	1,187	8.1	
Daren Queenan	G/F	Lehigh	1984	1988	118	2,703	22.9	1,013	8.6	
David Robinson*	C	Navy	1983	1987	127	2,669	21.0	1,314	10.3	
Ron Harper	G/F	Miami (Ohio)	1982	1986	120	2,377	19.8	1,119	9.3	
Greg Grant	F	Utah State	1982	1986	115	2,159	18.8	1,003	8.7	
Larry Krystkowiak	F	Montana	1982	1986	120	2,017	16.8	1,105	9.2	
Wayman Tisdale	C	Oklahoma	1982	1985	104	2,661	25.6	1,048	10.1	
Keith Lee	C	Memphis	1981	1985	128	2,408	18.8	1,336	10.4	
Patrick Ewing*	C	Georgetown	1981	1985	143	2,184	15.3	1,316	9.2	
Xavier McDaniel	F	Wichita State	1981	1985	117	2,152	18.4	1,359	11.6	
Mark Acres	C	Oral Roberts	1981	1985	110	2,038	18.5	1,051	9.6	
Willie Jackson	F	Centenary	1980	1984	114	2,535	22.2	1,013	8.9	
Joe Binion	F	North Carolina A&T	1980	1984	116	2,143	18.5	1,194	10.3	
Sam Perkins	C	North Carolina	1980	1984	136	2,145	15.9	1,167	8.6	
Harry Kelly	F	Texas Southern	1979	1983	110	3,066	27.9	1,085	9.9	
Kenneth Lyons	F	North Texas	1979	1983	111	2,291	20.6	1,020	9.2	
Ralph Sampson*	C	Virginia	1979	1983	132	2,225	16.9	1,511	11.4	
Sidney Green	F/C	UNLV	1979	1983	119	2,073	17.4	1,276	10.7	
B. B. Davis	C	Lamar	1977	1981	119	2,084	17.5	1,122	9.4	
Rudy Macklin	G/F	LSU	1976	1981	123	2,080	16.9	1,276	10.4	
Herb Williams	F/C	Ohio State	1977	1981	114	2,011	17.6	1,111	9.7	
Michael Brooks	F	La Salle	1976	1980	114	2,628	23.1	1,372	12.0	
Mike Gminski	C	Duke	1976	1980	122	2,323	19.0	1,242	10.2	
Jonathan Moore	F/C	Furman	1976	1980	117	2,299	19.6	1,242	10.6	
Joe Barry Carroll	C	Purdue	1976	1980	123	2,175	17.7	1,148	9.3	
Larry Bird*	F	Indiana State	1976	1979	94	2,850	30.3	1,247	13.3	
Calvin Natt	F	Louisiana–Monroe	1975	1979	108	2,581	23.9	1,285	11.9	
Reggie King	F	Alabama	1975	1979	118	2,168	18.4	1,279	10.8	
Bill Cartwright	C	San Francisco	1975	1979	111	2,116	19.1	1,137	10.2	
Sidney Moncrief*	G	Arkansas	1975	1979	122	2,066	16.9	1,015	8.3	
James Bailey	F/C	Rutgers	1975	1979	122	2,034	16.7	1,074	8.8	
Greg Kelser	F	Michigan State	1975	1979	115	2,014	17.5	1,092	9.5	
Gary Winton	F	Army	1974	1978	105	2,296	21.9	1,168	11.1	
Bob Elliott	F/C	Arizona	1973	1977	114	2,131	18.7	1,083	9.5	
Rick Bullock	F	Texas Tech	1972	1976	107	2,118	19.8	1,057	9.9	
Phil Sellers	G/F	Rutgers	1972	1976	114	2,399	21.0	1,115	9.8	
Jim McDaniels	C	Western Kentucky	1968	1971	81	2,238	27.6	1,118	13.8	
Dan Issel*	C	Kentucky	1967	1970	83	2,138	25.8	1,078	12.9	
Bob Lanier*	C	St. Bonaventure	1967	1970	75	2,067	27.6	1,180	15.7	
Lew Alcindor* (Note: Changed his name to Kareem Abdul-Jabbar in 1971, after converting to Islam.)	C	UCLA	1966	1969	88	2,325	26.4	1,367	15.5	
Elvin Hayes*	F/C	Houston	1965	1968	93	2,884	31.0	1,602	17.2	
Bill Bradley*	F	Princeton	1962	1965	83	2,503	30.2	1,008	12.1	
Rick Barry*	F	Miami (Florida)	1962	1965	77	2,298	29.8	1,274	16.5	
Fred Hetzel	F/C	Davidson	1962	1965	79	2,032	25.7	1,094	13.8	
Nick Werkman	F	Seton Hall	1961	1964	71	2,273	32.0	1,036	14.6	
Bill McGill	F/C	Utah	1959	1962	86	2,321	27.0	1,106	12.3	
Len Chappell	F/C	Wake Forest	1959	1962	87	2,165	24.9	1,213	13.9	
Jeff Cohen	F/C	William & Mary	1957	1961	103	2,003	19.4	1,679	17.8	
Oscar Robertson*	G	Cincinnati	1957	1960	88	2,973	33.8	1,338	15.2	
Jerry West*	G	West Virginia	1957	1960	93	2,309	24.8	1,240	13.3	
Ralph Crosthwaite	C	Western Kentucky	1954	1959	103	2,076	20.2	1,309	12.7	
Bailey Howell*	F	Mississippi State	1956	1959	75	2,030	27.1	1,277	17.0	
Elgin Baylor*	C	Seattle	1955	1958	80	2,500	31.2	1,559	19.4	
Joe Holup	F	George Washington	1952	1956	104	2,226	21.4	2,030	19.5	
Maurice Stokes	C/F	Saint Francis (PA)	1951	1955	102	2,282	22.4	1,819	25.3	
Dickie Hemric	F	Wake Forest	1951	1955	104	2,587	24.9	1,802	17.3	
Tom Gola*	G/F	La Salle	1951	1955	118	2,462	20.9	2,201	18.7	
Jesse Arnelle	F	Penn State	1951	1955	102	2,138	21.0	1,238	12.1	
