= La La Anthony =

American television personality

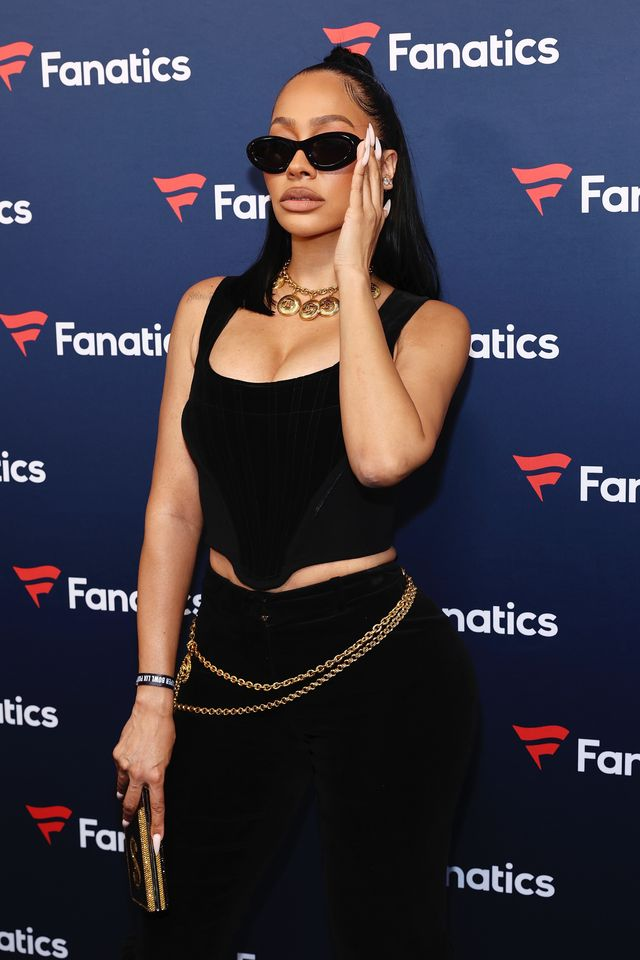
- Anthony in 2026
- Born: Alani Nicole Vázquez; June 25, 1979 or 1982 (Note: Sources point to a birth year of 1979, or 1982.); New York City, U.S.
- Occupations: Television personality; actress
- Years active: 1996–present
- Spouse: Carmelo Anthony (m. 2010; div. 2021)
- Children: Kiyan Anthony

Alani Nicole "La La" Anthony (née Vázquez; born June 25, 1979 or 1982) is an American television personality and actress. In the early 2000s, she worked as an MTV VJ on Total Request Live. She was the host of the VH1 reality television reunion shows Flavor of Love, I Love New York, For the Love of Ray J, and Real Chance of Love, and was a dean on Charm School with Ricki Lake.

Anthony appeared in Two Can Play That Game (2001), You Got Served (2004), Think Like a Man (2012), Think Like a Man Too (2014), November Rule (2015) and Destined (2015). She appeared as Lakeisha Grant in the Starz original drama series Power. She hosted the American reality television series La La's Full Court Wedding and La La's Full Court Life. She was married to NBA player Carmelo Anthony from 2010 to 2021.

== Early life ==
Anthony was born in Brooklyn, New York. Her parents, who are of Puerto Rican heritage, were born and raised in New York City. Anthony (who describes herself as an Afro-Puerto Rican) has a younger brother and two younger sisters. As a young child, she was involved in many activities, but music was her main interest. After graduating from Redan High School in 1997, she attended Howard University for three months.

== Career ==
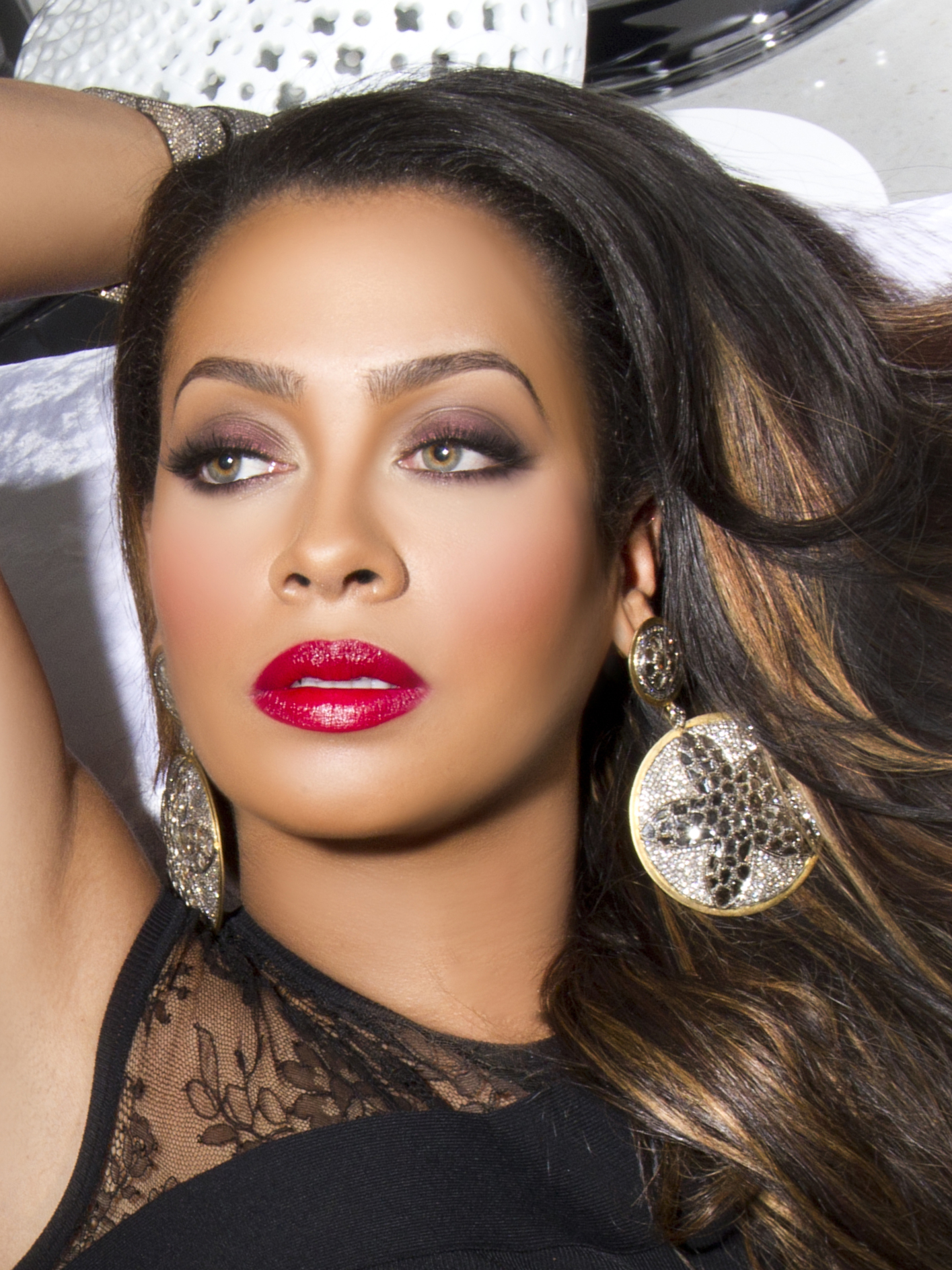
Anthony in 2012

Anthony started working in radio at WHTA-FM, HOT 97.5 in Georgia. After a short internship at that station she hosted Future Flavas, alongside rapper/actor Ludacris.

Anthony worked at Los Angeles's 92.3 The Beat cohosting The B-Syde. She left the station in 2001 and moved to MTV where she cohosted Direct Effect and Total Request Live.

In 2006, Anthony left MTV. She worked as a producer on Mike Tyson’s documentary, Tyson, which won the Regard Knockout Award in France and was included in the 2009 Cannes Film Festival. Anthony also produced a feature film with director/producer Brett Ratner.

Anthony appeared in films Two Can Play That Game, Think Like a Man, Baggage Claim and television shows "NYC 22" and Single Ladies. Other film credits include Urban Massacre (2002), Monster Island (2004), and You Got Served (2004).

In October 2011, Anthony appeared in the off-Broadway production of Love Loss and What I Wore. Anthony appeared in and executive produced La La's Full Court Wedding, which chronicled the time leading up to her wedding to NBA star Carmelo Anthony.

On February 2, 2012, she launched a cosmetic line and in 2013 a clothing line. She has written several books, including The Love Playbook (2014). Anthony co-produced the Broadway production of Danai Gurira's Eclipsed in 2016.

== Personal life ==
On Christmas Day 2004, she became engaged to basketball player Carmelo Anthony, whom she met in 2003. Their son, Kiyan, was born in 2007. They were married by Michael Eric Dyson on July 10, 2010, at Cipriani's in New York. The ceremony was filmed by VH1 and aired as part of a reality series on the couple, titled La La's Full Court Wedding. The couple's life together was also chronicled on their continuation series, La La's Full Court Life. In June 2021, she filed for divorce.

== Filmography ==
=== Film ===
Year	Title	Role	Notes
2001	Two Can Play That Game	DJ	
2002	Urban Massacre	Pam Jackson	
2004	You Got Served	Herself	
2004	Monster Island	Herself	
2004	Soul Plane	Herself	
2006	Da Jammies	Angelique (voice)	Video
2009	Spring Breakdown	Celebrity Judge	
2010	Gun	Mona	
2012	Think Like a Man	Sonia	
2013	1982	Neecy	
2013	Baggage Claim	Tanya	
2014	Think Like a Man Too	Sonia	
2015	November Rule	Stacey	
2015	Chi-Raq	Hecuba	
2016	Destined	Jada	
2017	Deuces	Detective Sonya Diaz	
2017	Double Play	Micha	
2018	Furlough	Brandy	
2018	The Separatists	CPD Dispatcher (voice)	Short film
2019	Holiday Rush	Paula Williams	
2022	9 Bullets	Tasmin	
2023	You People	Shaela	
2023	The Perfect Find	Elodie	
2024	The Bad Guardian	Janet Timms	TV movie

=== Television ===
Year	Title	Role	Notes
2000	Wherehouse Live	Herself	Main host
2001	On the Beat	Herself	Main host
2002	Direct Effect	Herself	Main host
2002	TRL Presents: Christina Stripped in New York City	Herself	Main host
2002–06	Total Request Live	Herself	Recurring host
2003	Sex and the City	MTV Interviewer	Episode: "The Post-it Always Sticks Twice"
2003	MC Battle	Herself	Main host
2003	The Real World: Paris	Herself	Host; Episode: "French Kissing and Telling, The Real World: Paris Reunion"
2004	One on One	Kendra	Episode: "Phatheadz"
2004	Direct Effect Presents: Straight Up Hip Hop All Week	Herself	Main host
2004	MTV New Year's Eve Specials 2004	Herself	Main host
2004	Iced Out New Year's Eve 2005	Herself	Main host
2004	Real World/Road Rules Challenge: The Inferno	Herself	Host; Episode: "Montezuma's Revenge: Inside the Inferno Reunion Show"
2005	Real World/Road Rules Challenge: Battle of the Sexes 2	Herself	Host; Episode: "Battle of the Sexes 2: Reunion – Secrets from Elimination Hill"
2006	Chappelle's Show	Herself	Episode: "Black Howard Dean & Stereotype Pixies"
2006–08	Flavor of Love	Herself	Main host
2007	Flavor of Love Girls: Charm School	Herself	Host; Episode: "Reunion"
2007–08	I Love New York	Herself	Main host
2008–09	Real Chance of Love	Herself	Main host
2009	Charm School with Ricki Lake	Herself	Main judge
2009	CSI: NY	Lisa Williams	Episode: "Second Chances"
2009–10	For the Love of Ray J	Herself	Main host
2010	La La's Full Court Wedding	Herself	Main cast
2010–11	Keeping Up with the Kardashians	Herself	Guest cast: Seasons 5–6
2011	Arthur Ashe Kids' Day	Herself	Main host
2011–14	La La's Full Court Life	Herself	Main cast
2012	Project Runway All Stars	Herself	Episode: "An Unconventional Nightmare Before Christmas"
2012	Let's Stay Together	Latrice	Episode: "Fear Factor"
2012	NYC 22	PAA Kelly	Episode: "Jumpers"
2012–14	Single Ladies	Presley Kearse	Recurring cast: Season 3–4
2013	Real Husbands of Hollywood	Herself	Episode: "The Reunion Special"
2013	Behind the Music	Herself	Episode: "Ludacris"
2013	Law & Order: Special Victims Unit	Anna Tejada	Episode: "Poisoned Motive"
2014	Global Spin Awards	Herself	Main host
2014–20	Power	Lakeisha Grant	Recurring cast: Seasons 1–3, main cast: Seasons 4–6
2015	The Meredith Vieira Show	Herself	Panelist; Episode: "Episode #1.148"
2015	My Fab 40th	Herself	Episode: "Forty, I Do!"
2015–16	Unforgettable	Dr. Delina Michaels	Main cast: Season 4
2015–18	The View	Herself	Guest co-host: Seasons 18–19 and 21
2017	Martha & Snoop's Potluck Dinner Party	Herself	Episode: "Keepin' It Crunk"
2017	The Talk	Herself	Guest co-host; Episode: "Episode #7.198"
2017	The New Edition Story	Flo DeVoe	2 episodes
2017	Bull	Lesley Caffrey	Episode: "Bring It On"
2017	Daytime Divas	Isabel Carlisle	Episode: "Baby Daddy Drama"
2017–19	Dear Mama: An Event to Honor Moms	Herself	Main host
2018	Steve	Herself	Panelist; Episode: "La La Anthony/Tracey Edmonds/Kim Gravel/Ta'Rhonda Jones"
2018	Uncensored	Herself	Episode: "La La Anthony"
2018	Star	Paola	Episode: "Dreamers" & "Forward (E)Motion"
2019	Drop the Mic	Herself	Episode: "Jack Osbourne vs. Kelly Osbourne and Mel B vs. La La Anthony"
2019	The $100,000 Pyramid	Herself	Celebrity player; Episode: "Joel McHale vs. Rich Eisen and Jerry Ferrara vs. La La Anthony"
2019	BH90210	Shay	Recurring cast
2019	Reef Break	Regina O'Casey	Episode: "Blue Skies" & "Endgame"
2020	Homecoming 2020: Meet Me on the Yard	Herself	Main host
2020–25	The Chi	Dominque "Dom" Morris	Recurring cast: Seasons 3 - 7
2021	Grown-ish	Esme	Episode: "A Peace of Light" and "Canceled"
2021	Wu-Tang: An American Saga	Tracy Waples	Recurring cast: Season 2
2021–23	BMF	Markaisha Taylor	Guest: Season 1, main cast: Season 2 - present
2021–23	The Freak Brothers	Gretchen Switzer (voice)	Main cast: Season 1, recurring cast: Season 2
2022	The Kardashians	Herself	2 episodes
2022	Power Book II: Ghost	Lakeisha Grant	Episode: "A Fair Fight?"
2022	East New York	Jasmine	Episode: "The Small Things"
2023	The Cube	Herself	Episode: "America, Do You Have What It Takes?"
2023	Black Pop: Celebrating the Power of Black Culture	Herself	Main narrator
2023	Bupkis	Lisa	Episode: "ISO"

=== Music videos ===
Year	Title	Artist
2002	"Oh Boy"	Cam'ron
2002	"Miss You"	Aaliyah
2005	"So Much More"	Fat Joe
2007	"Can't Leave 'em Alone"	Ciara featuring 50 Cent
2008	"What Them Girls Like"	Ludacris featuring Chris Brown and Sean Garrett
2018	"In My Feelings"	Drake
2019	"Hot Girl Summer"	Megan Thee Stallion

=== Documentary ===
Year	Title
2003	50 Cent: The New Breed

== See also ==
- List of notable Puerto Ricans
- Category:Hip-hop DJs
