= Fred West (basketball) =

American basketball player

Personal information
- Born: c. 1969 (age 56–57)
- Listed height: 6 ft 9 in (2.06 m)

Career information
- College: Texas Southern (1986–1990)
- NBA draft: 1990: undrafted
- Position: Power forward

Fred West (born c. 1969) is a retired American expatriate professional basketball player who is best known for his college career at Texas Southern University between 1986–87 and 1989–90. He guided the Tigers to an overall record of 68 wins and 51 losses during that time. As a junior in 1988–89, Texas Southern were co-regular season Southwestern Athletic Conference champions but lost in the conference tournament. The following year, West's senior season, they did not repeat as regular season champions but did manage to win the SWAC Conference Tournament, thus automatically qualifying Texas Southern for its first-ever NCAA Men's Division I Basketball Championship. The Tigers, seeded #14 in the Midwest Region, lost to #3 Georgetown in the first round. West scored 2,066 points and grabbed 1,136 rebounds in his collegiate career, placing him in an exclusive group of players to have reached both milestones at the Division I level.

After college, the Yakima Sun Kings of the Continental Basketball Association picked him in the 1990 CBA Draft. He also played professionally abroad, including a stint in Argentina, before retiring.

== See also ==
- List of NCAA Division I men's basketball players with 2000 points and 1000 rebounds
