= La La's Full Court Life =

U.S. reality television series

- Genre: Reality
- Created by: La La Anthony; Cris Abrego; Steven Grossman
- Starring: La La Anthony; Carmelo Anthony
- Country of origin: United States
- Original language: English
- No. of seasons: 5
- No. of episodes: 45

Production
- Executive producers: Cris Abrego; Angela Aguilera; La La Anthony; Carmelo Anthony; Jill Holmes; Kristen Kelly
- Running time: 40 to 43 minutes
- Production companies: 51 Minds Entertainment; Krossover Entertainment

Original release
- Network: VH1
- Release: August 22, 2011 – July 2, 2014

Related
- La La's Full Court Wedding

La La's Full Court Life is an American reality television series on VH1. The series debuted on August 22, 2011, and is the follow-up series to La La's Full Court Wedding. La La's Full Court Life chronicles the life of Alani Vasquez aka La La as she experiences married life with the professional basketball player Carmelo Anthony, evolving from being the fiancée of a basketball player to being a basketball wife and how she manages her life while keeping her career in check.

== Cast ==
- La La Vasquez
- Carmelo Anthony
- Candice "Dice" Dixon: La La's cousin and best friend
- Po Johnson: La La's best friend

== Episodes ==
=== Series overview ===
Season	Episodes	Originally released	
Season	Episodes	First released	Last released
1	10	August 22, 2011	October 31, 2011
2	10	March 19, 2012	May 21, 2012
3	10	February 18, 2013	March 18, 2013
4	8	July 14, 2013	September 1, 2013
5	8	May 7, 2014	July 2, 2014

=== Season 1 (2011) ===
No. overall	No. in season	Title	Original release date	U.S. viewers (millions)
1	1	"The Carmelo Anthony Life"	August 22, 2011	1.80
2	2	"The Critic's Choice"	August 29, 2011	1.40
3	3	"The Bang"	September 5, 2011	1.27
4	4	"The Aftermath"	September 12, 2011	1.10
5	5	"The Press"	September 19, 2011	1.07
6	6	"The Basketball Mistress"	September 26, 2011	1.37
7	7	"The Bright Idea"	October 10, 2011	0.89
8	8	"The Home Front"	October 17, 2011	0.97
9	9	"The Getaway"	October 24, 2011	1.13
10	10	"The End"	October 31, 2011	0.95

=== Season 2 (2012) ===
No. overall	No. in season	Title	Original release date	U.S. viewers (millions)
11	1	"Miss Trust"	March 19, 2012	1.81
12	2	"Birthday Presence"	March 26, 2012	1.70
13	3	"Friend of Faux Pas"	April 2, 2012	1.49
14	4	"Cakes and Pains"	April 9, 2012	1.47
15	5	"Maybe Baby?"	April 16, 2012	1.75
16	6	"All Bets Are Awful"	April 23, 2012	1.64
17	7	"Race Under Fire"	April 30, 2012	1.25
18	8	"Fights, Camera, Action!"	May 7, 2012	1.38
19	9	"Kiss and Makeup: Part 1"	May 14, 2012	1.37
20	10	"Kiss and Makeup: Part 2"	May 21, 2012	1.58

=== Season 3 (2013) ===
No. overall	No. in season	Title	Original release date	U.S. viewers (millions)
21	1	"London Ballin'"	February 18, 2013	1.36
22	2	"Global Grind"	February 18, 2013	1.24
23	3	"Here Comes the Groom(s)"	February 25, 2013	1.23
24	4	"Kiyan Makes a Splash"	February 25, 2013	1.17
25	5	"Always Bet on La La"	March 4, 2013	1.13
26	6	"Carmelo's Full Court Dedication"	March 4, 2013	1.17
27	7	"La & Kelly Horse Around"	March 11, 2013	0.97
28	8	"Fan Appreciation"	March 11, 2013	0.89
29	9	"No Money, Mo' Problems"	March 18, 2013	0.92
30	10	"The Goodbye Girls"	March 18, 2013	0.78

=== Season 4 (2013) ===
No. overall	No. in season	Title	Original release date	U.S. viewers (millions)
31	1	"An Open Book"	July 14, 2013	0.99
31	2	"Falling Apart At the Seams"	July 21, 2013	0.84
32	3	"Parenthood"	July 28, 2013	1.06
33	4	"La La Knows Best?"	August 4, 2013	0.85
34	5	"Met Ball"	August 11, 2013	0.66
35	6	"Digital Detox"	August 18, 2013	0.84
36	7	"Be Careful What You Wish For"	September 1, 2013	0.64
37	8	"Nose to the Grindstone"	September 1, 2013	0.67

=== Season 5 (2014) ===
No. overall	No. in season	Title	Original release date	U.S. viewers (millions)
38	1	"Growing Pains"	May 7, 2014	1.01
39	2	"Guess Who's Coming to Dinner"	May 14, 2014	0.78
40	3	"Rocky"	May 21, 2014	0.72
41	4	"Cold Mountain"	May 28, 2014	0.98
42	5	"Meet the Parents"	June 4, 2014	0.79
43	6	"Working Girl"	June 11, 2014	0.79
44	7	"Little Shop of Horrors"	June 25, 2014	N/A
45	8	"How to Succeed in Business"	July 2, 2014	N/A
