= Tom Davis (basketball player) =

American former basketball player

Personal information
- Born: c. 1970
- Listed height: 6 ft 7 in (2.01 m)
- Listed weight: 225 lb (102 kg)

Career information
- High school: Olney (Philadelphia, Pennsylvania); Willingboro (Willingboro Township, New Jersey)
- College: Delaware State (1987–1991)
- NBA draft: 1991: undrafted
- Position: Power forward

Career highlights
- MEAC Player of the Year (1989); 2× First-team All-MEAC (1989, 1990)

Tom Davis (born c. 1970) is an American former basketball player who is best known for his college career at Delaware State University between 1987–88 and 1990–91.

Davis grew up in Philadelphia, Pennsylvania and attended Olney High School for his first three years of prep school. He then transferred to Willingboro High School in Willingboro Township, New Jersey for his senior year. When it came time to choose which college to attend, Davis wanted to stay relatively close to home and not "get lost in the shuffle" of a big time athletics program. He and his friend (and fellow high school teammate) Paul Newman decided to attend whichever NCAA Division I program recruited both of them first, and that ended up being Delaware State.

A 6 ft 7 in (2.01 m) power forward, Davis became the most statistically accomplished player in program history by the time he graduated in 1991. He scored a then-Mid-Eastern Athletic Conference record 2,275 points (surpassed in 2019–20) and also grabbed 1,013 rebounds. The list of those who achieved both 2000 points and 1000 rebounds is a small one. As a sophomore in 1988–89, Davis was named the MEAC Player of the Year, and he was twice selected to the all-conference team. Davis once scored 47 points in a game against UTEP and had a 29-point, 13-rebound performance against Ohio State.

Despite his lauded collegiate career, Davis did not get selected in the 1991 NBA draft, nor was he ever signed by an NBA team.

== See also ==
- List of NCAA Division I men's basketball players with 2000 points and 1000 rebounds
